= Women in Egypt =

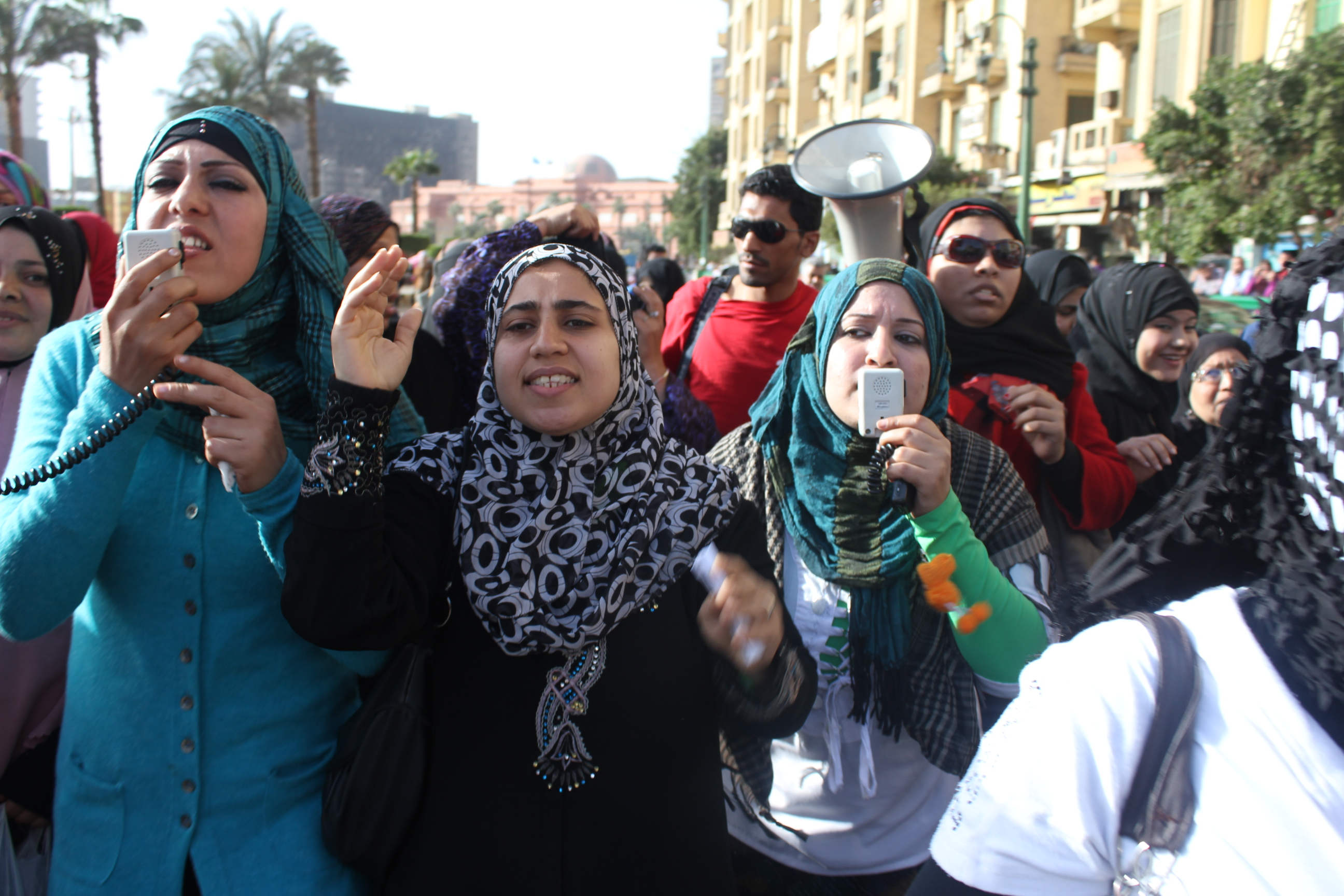
- Egyptian women participating in a demonstration

General statistics
- Maternal mortality (per 100,000): 17 (2020)
- Women in parliament: 22.8% (2022)
- Women over 25 with secondary education: 85.9% (2022)
- Women in labour force: 15.3% (2022)

Gender Inequality Index
- Value: 0.389 (2022)
- Rank: 93rd out of 193

Global Gender Gap Index
- Value: 0.629 (2024)
- Rank: 135th out of 146

The role of women in Egypt has changed significantly from ancient times to the modern era.

Early archaeological records show that Egyptian women were considered equal to men, regardless of marital status. They could own property, initiate divorce, and hold positions of religious and political authority, as exemplified by figures such as Hatshepsut and Cleopatra. However, their status declined over time under the successive rule of the misogynistic Roman Empire, the Christian Byzantine Empire, and later various Islamic states. While Islamic law granted women rights that were often denied in the West, such as the right to own property and greater marital autonomy, it also promoted gender segregation and restricted women’s participation in public life. Nevertheless, elite women continued to wield influence through patronage and familial networks.

Beginning in the 19th century, the Egyptian women’s rights movement emerged alongside broader campaigns for modernization, national identity, and independence from colonial rule. Feminist leaders such as Huda Sha'rawi, Zaynab al-Ghazali, and Doria Shafik advocated for women's political and social rights, especially after women were denied suffrage following the 1919 revolution and Egypt's formal independence in 1922. A major milestone came with the 1952 Egyptian Revolution: the new regime affirmed gender equality under the law, expanded access to higher education, and, under the 1956 constitution, granted women the right to vote and run for public office. Throughout the 20th century, women made gains particularly in education and healthcare. However, challenges remain: women’s participation in the workforce is still critically low, and gender-based violence and legal inequality (especially in the spheres of marriage and divorce) persists.

== History ==
=== Women in ancient Egypt ===
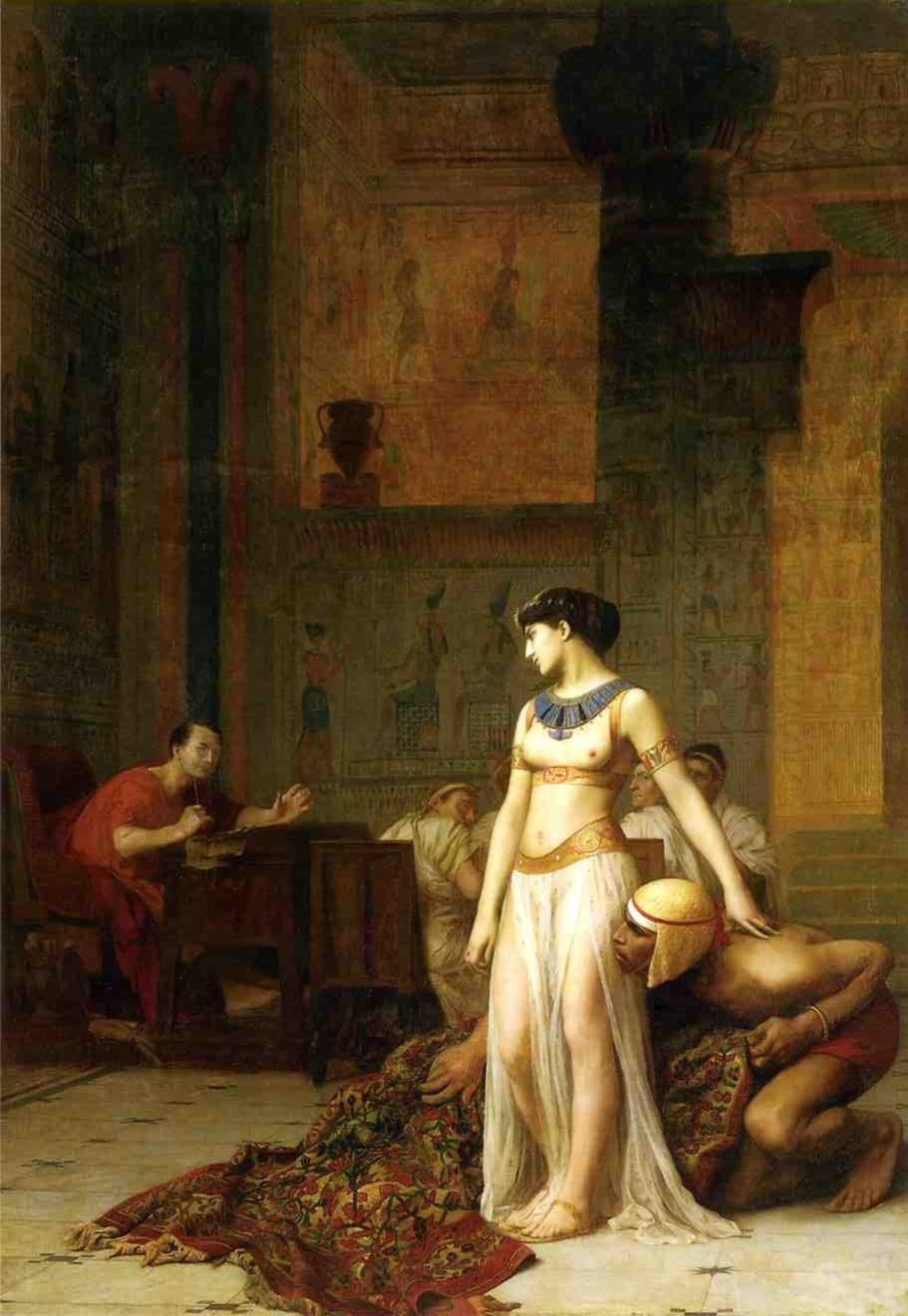
Cleopatra and Julius Caesar

In ancient Egypt, women had equal rights to men under the law in numerous spheres. According to Dr. Barbara Watterson, a scholar of ancient Egypt:

In ancient Egypt a woman enjoyed the same rights under the law as a man. What her de jure [rightful entitlement] rights were depended upon her social class not her sex. All landed property descended in the female line, from mother to daughter, on the assumption, perhaps, that maternity is a matter of fact, paternity a matter of opinion. A woman was entitled to administer her own property and dispose of it as she wished. She could buy, sell, be a partner in legal contracts, be executor in wills and witness to legal documents, bring an action at court, and adopt children in her own name.

Women were also largely free to marry and divorce as they wished, and could travel at will; some research has shown that premarital sex and abortions were permissible and unstigmatized.

However, women were more limited in terms of employment. Patriarchal culture ensured that women were expected to manage the household, and while they were permitted to work outside the home, gender and especially class limited their opportunities. In addition to domestic tasks, some women were able to work as physicians, merchants, textile workers, dentists, beer brewers, and more. Women could also become priestesses and take on important roles in religious observance.

Royal Egyptian women had great impact on Egyptian Society. Tiye, the queen consort of Egypt and grandmother of Tutankhamen (better known as King Tut) was so enmeshed in politics that the ruler of the neighboring Kingdom of Mitanni (modern-day northern Syria) wrote to her to ensure good will between their people when her son Akhenaten ascended to the throne.

The first confirmed queen regnant in ancient Egypt was Sobekneferu who ruled for a brief three years around 1800 BC. However, subsequent female rulers are famous up until modern day: Hatshepsut, Nefertiti and Cleopatra. Hatshepsut usurped the throne and reigned in Egypt as pharaoh from about 1479 to 1458 B.C. She based most of Egypt's economy on commerce. Nefertiti, the chief wife of Egyptian pharaoh Amenhotep IV, was known as a powerful advocate for monotheistic religious policy. Cleopatra ruled from about 51 to 30 BC, and was the last active Hellenistic pharaoh. Hatshepsut and Nefertiti were examples of women, along with Nefertari and the Nubian queens, who became the highest office holders in the kingdom, sharing a status of co-rulers with men, even being depicted in monuments with the same height as their husbands or as the Egyptian gods. Additionally, some women of royal lineage took on religious roles as well; the most important religious offices of that kind were those of God's Wife and God's Wife of Amun.

Only the children (male or female) from the Great Royal Wife could expect to succeed to the throne. If the Great Royal Wife had only daughters, a son by another wife or concubine could ascend to the throne by marrying their heir apparent daughter. Women had a more difficult time ascending in political roles outside of royalty: In the Sixth Dynasty, Nebet became the first Egyptian woman to become a vizier.

=== Women in Roman Egypt ===
Following Octavian's victory over Marcus Antonius and Kleopatra VII in 31 BCE, Egypt became a province of the Roman Empire. This marked the end of the Ptolemaic Kingdom and the beginning of Roman rule in Egypt.

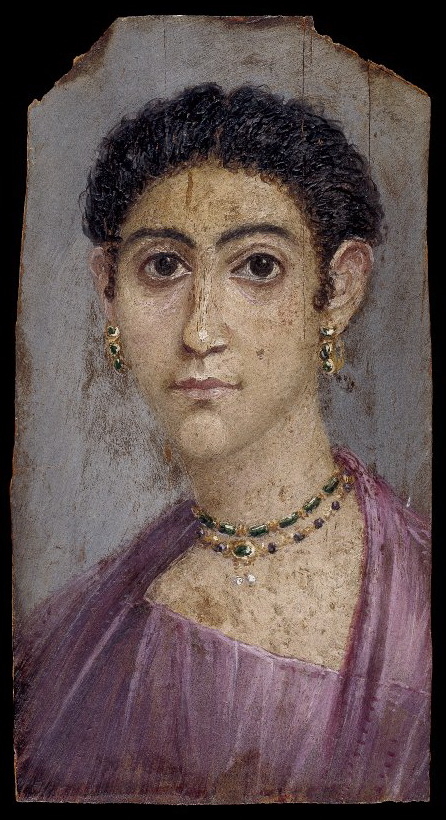
Fayum mummy portrait of a woman (Roman Egypt, 100-120 CE)

The legal status of women in Roman Egypt depended on their social background and citizenship. Roman women in Egypt followed Augustan laws that encouraged marriage and childbirth, promoting family growth. Roman women in the province were legally and socially subordinate to men, subject to Augustan laws promoting marriage and childbirth, reinforcing their roles as wives and mothers in line with Roman family ideals. Egyptian women had traditionally enjoyed more legal independence under earlier Pharaonic and Ptolemaic systems. However, under Roman rule, they were increasingly required to follow Greek customs that mandated the presence of a male guardian (kyrios)—a father, husband, or male relative—for major transactions. While Ptolemaic Egypt had recognized both Demotic and Greek contracts, Roman authorities discouraged Demotic language use, making Greek written contracts dominant by the end of the first century CE. In 212 CE, the Constitutio Antoniniana granted Roman citizenship to all free inhabitants of the empire, including Egypt. This extended Roman legal norms to many local women. Compared to Greek law, Roman law was somewhat less restrictive: it required male authorization for fewer transactions. Additionally, the Jus trium liberorum granted legal independence to women who had borne three or more children.

Marriage laws under Roman rule also reinforced social boundaries. The Lex Minicia discouraged marriages between Roman citizens and non-citizens by assigning children the lower status of their parents, limiting opportunities for upward social mobility. These measures helped the Roman state maintain control over the urban elite of Hellenized cities.

During the Roman period, intermarriage became quite common, with nearly a quarter of the population engaging in marriages between siblings and half-siblings. Wealthy families practiced intra-family marriages to preserve their material wealth within the family, while among poorer families, such marriages were often a strategy to avoid dowry costs for daughters. This practice declined significantly after the Constitutio Antoniana.

Census data from 11 to 257 CE show a low life expectancy in Roman Egypt. At birth, males had a life expectancy of about 25 years, and females about 22 years. Nearly half of all children died before age five. Women who survived early childhood typically lived into their forties. Most women married in their mid-to-late teens, while urban women tended to marry slightly later. Husbands were usually older, with age gaps ranging from two to thirteen years. Childbirth was a leading cause of death among women.

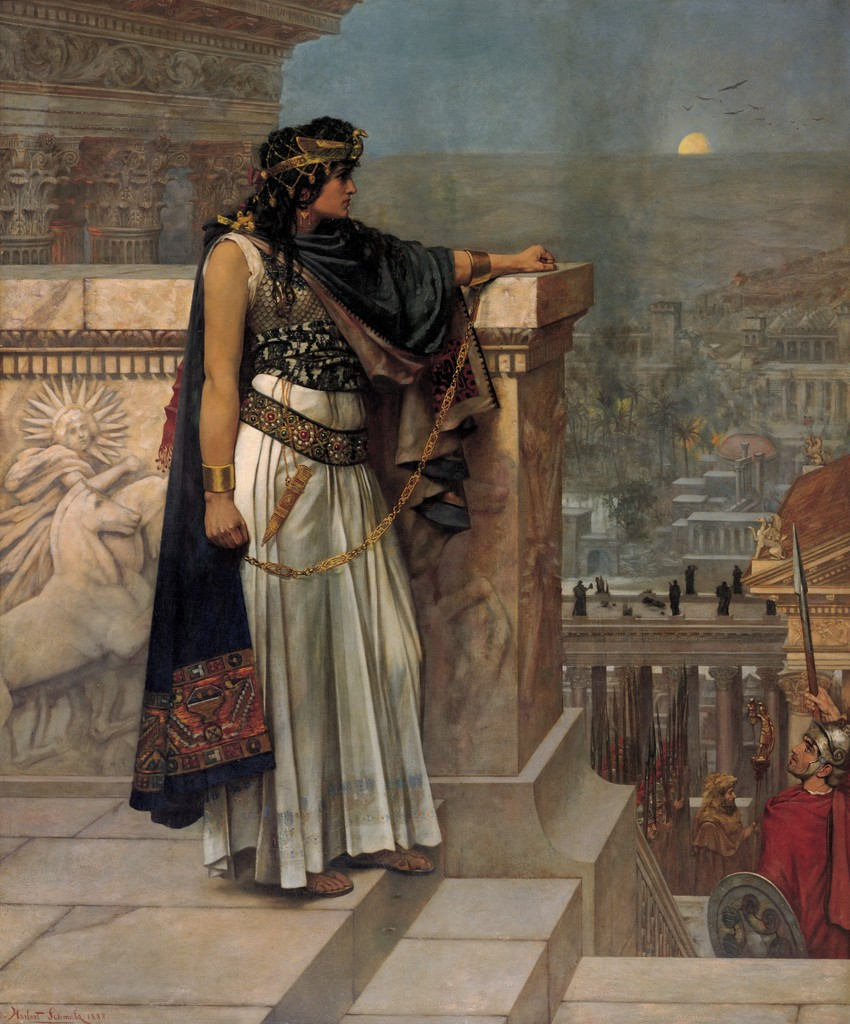
Zenobia's Last Look on Palmyra by Herbert Gustave Schmalz (1888)

In the third century CE, during a period of instability in the Roman Empire, Egypt was briefly seized by Zenobia, queen of the Palmyrene Empire. A highly ambitious and capable ruler, Zenobia expanded her kingdom after the assassination of her husband, King Odaenathus, who had been a key Roman ally against the Sassanids. Around 270 CE, she capitalized on Rome’s weakened control and launched a military campaign that extended Palmyrene rule over Egypt and much of the eastern provinces, claiming to act in the interests of her young son, Wahballath. Her control over Egypt, a vital supplier of grain to Rome, posed a significant threat to Emperor Aurelian. However, her reign was short-lived; by 272 CE, Aurelian launched a decisive campaign, defeating Zenobia’s forces and besieging her capital, Palmyra. Zenobia was eventually captured while attempting to flee to the Sassanid Empire, and her fate remains uncertain.

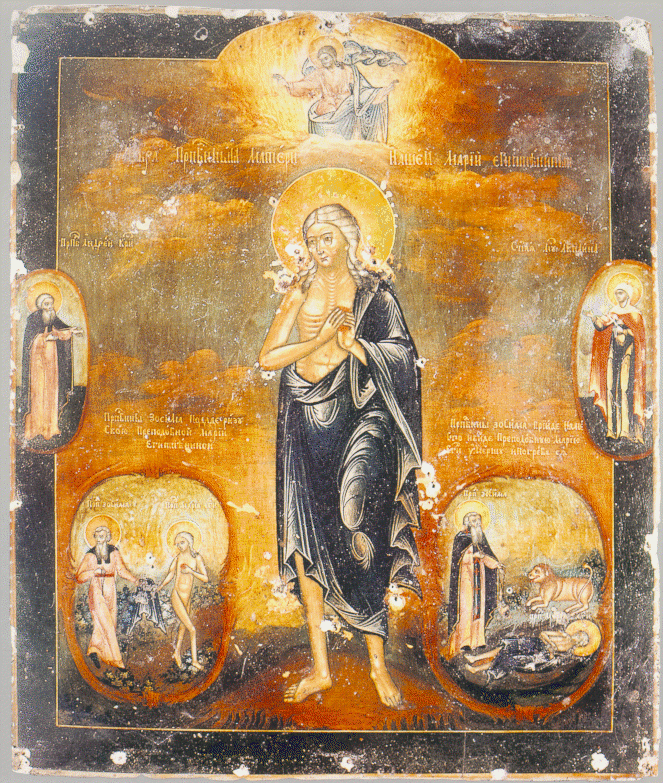
Russian icon of St. Mary of Egypt.

The rise of Christianity in Egypt in the third and fourth centuries CE opened new religious roles for women. With the end of persecution and the official recognition of the Church in 313 CE, women became influential figures in early Christian communities. Some became saints (such as Mary of Egypt), martyrs (such as Saint Demiana), and ascetics.

=== Women in late antique and Byzantine Egypt ===
Byzantine Egypt largely continued Roman patriarchal norms, with women expected to remain under the authority of male relatives. Nevertheless, in late antique and Byzantine Egypt, women participated in a wide range of economic activities. By the fourth century CE, both men and women owned and managed agricultural land. While women generally held less property than men, they inherited, leased, and co-managed assets, often with male family members. However, men usually represented them in legal and business matters, and widows and orphans were especially vulnerable to financial exploitation. Urban women engaged in buying, selling, renting, and mortgaging property and participated in moneylending and commodity trading. Lower-class women worked in retail, textile production, domestic service, and other trades. In rare cases, some women gained significant influence in male-dominated fields, becoming business owners, administrators, or even tax collectors.

=== Women in Islamic Period ===
Following the Muslim expansion into Egypt, women’s lives in the region became increasingly shaped by Islamic doctrines. Medieval Egyptian society placed significant emphasis on women's roles as caregivers and housekeepers, with their daily lives centered around marriage, childbirth, death, household management, participation in religious celebrations and other domestic affairs. Islamic law prescribed strict gender segregation, restricting women’s interactions with men outside their immediate families.

Both Islamic and Christian societies historically operated within patriarchal frameworks, often limiting women’s roles and rights. However, some scholars argue that early Islam granted women clearer and more consistent legal protections than Christianity did. The Qur’an gave women rights to inheritance, divorce, education, and financial independence, which were either absent or significantly delayed in many Christian contexts. While early Islamic teachings emphasized spiritual equality between genders, the later development of Islamic society was influenced by cultural and legal practices from the more patriarchal Byzantine and Sasanian empires, contributing to increasingly restrictive attitudes toward women.

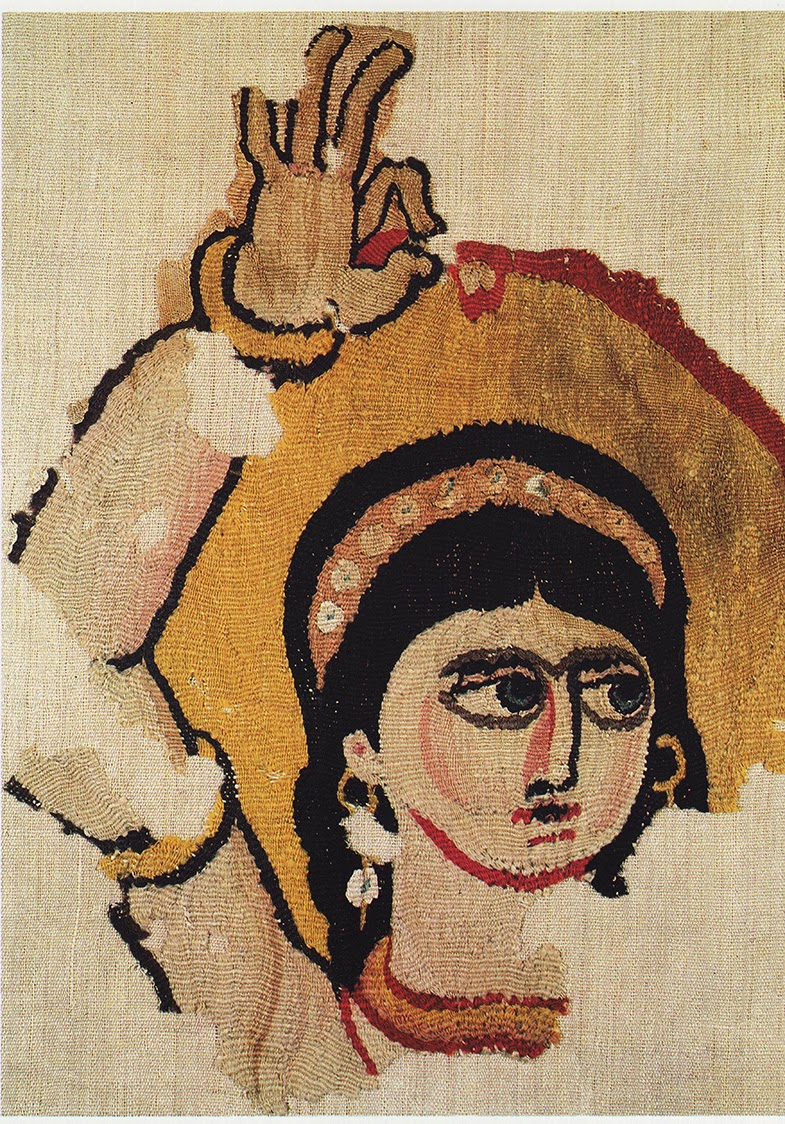
Head of a female dancer, Coptic textile, 4th–5th century

The transition from Byzantine to Islamic rule in Egypt was gradual, and in some areas, earlier social and legal practices persisted for generations. The Coptic village of Jeme remained a Christian enclave and did not undergo full Islamization before its abandonment in the 8th or 9th century CE. During the 7th and 8th centuries, Coptic women in Jeme continued to own, inherit, and manage property, engage in moneylending, and hold shares in churches. Despite the broader patriarchal structures of both Christian and Islamic societies, local traditions in communities like Jeme allowed women to retain active public and economic roles during a period of major political and religious transformation.

==== The Fatimid Caliphate ====
The Fatimid dynasty, the only Islamic dynasty that was named after a woman, came into possession of Egypt in 969 CE under the rule of al-Mu’izz, founding Cairo that the became the new capital of the caliphate.

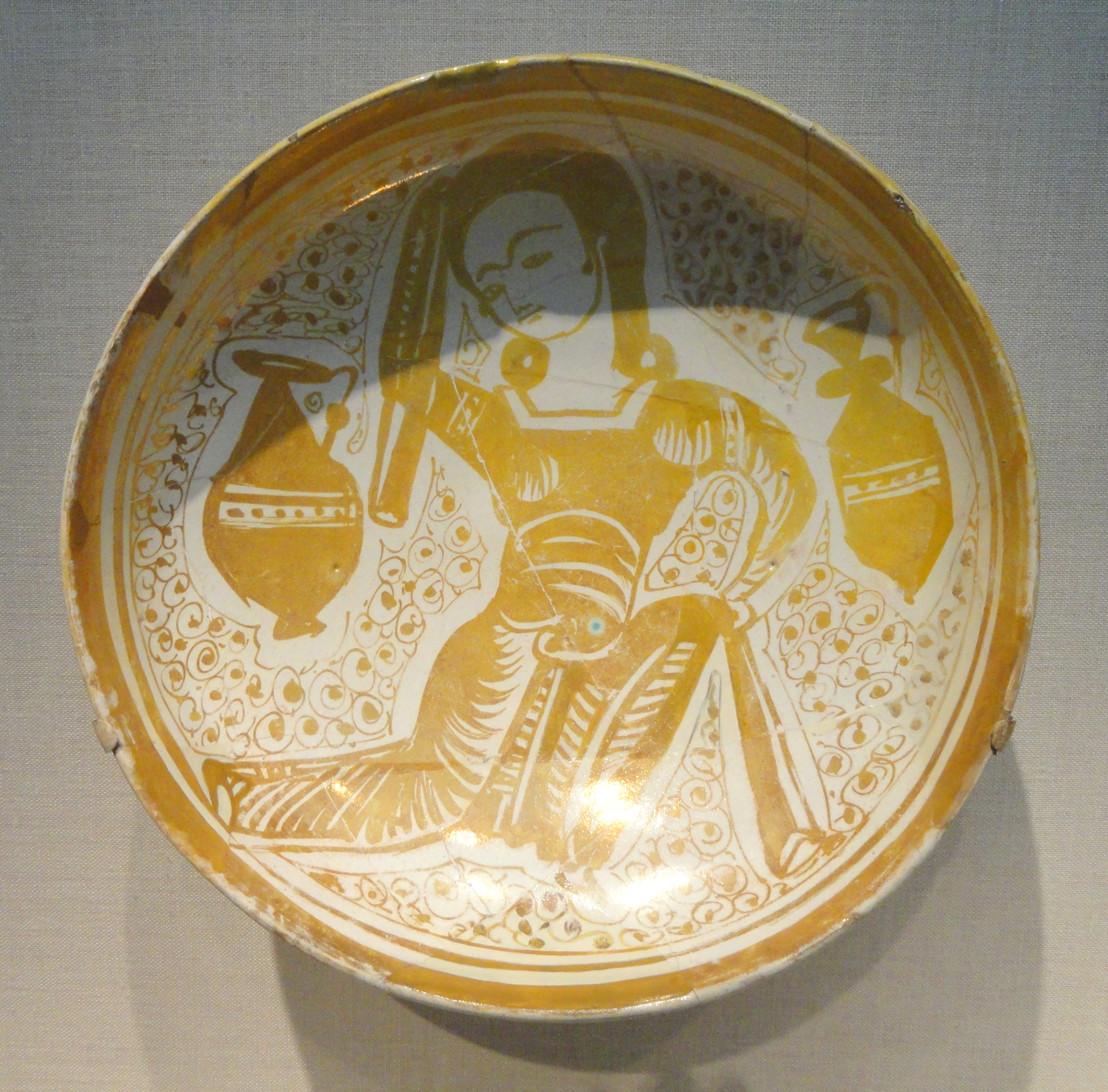
Woman on Fatimid bowl, 11th century CE

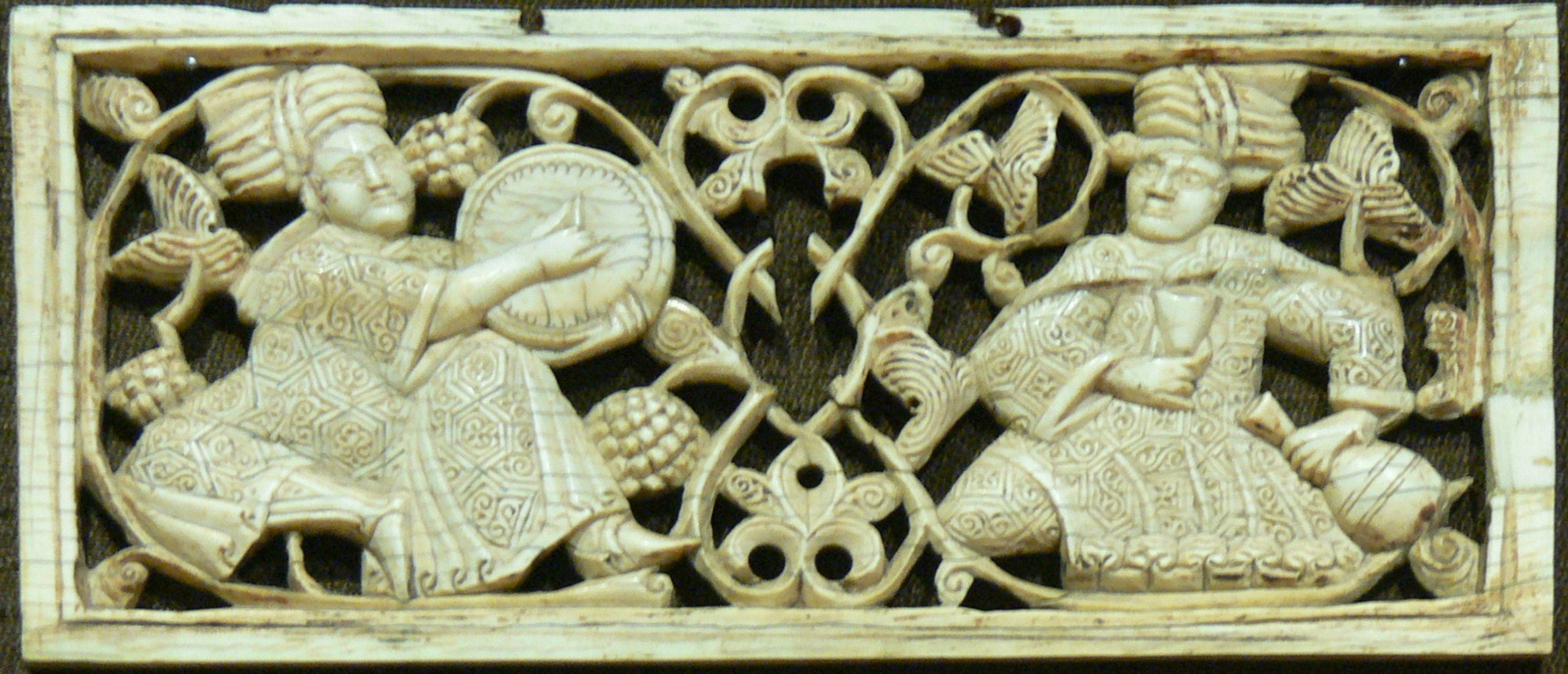
Fatimid ivory plaque depicting women (?) playing musical instruments and drinking

Women at the court, particularly those closely related to the caliphs or high-ranking officials, like Sitt al-Mulk, had substantial wealth and played significant roles in both patronage and politics. Their wealth came from a variety of sources: land grants, dowries, gifts from foreign rulers, and personal revenues from estates and other assets. The wealth of these women was not just a matter of personal luxury; it was instrumental in their ability to influence court politics, patronize cultural and religious projects, and contribute to the building of monuments in Cairo and beyond.

Under the Fatimids, Cairo thrived as a diverse, dynamic city where Muslims, Christians, and Jews lived, worked, and traded together despite legal efforts to enforce religious and gender boundaries. The Copts, Egypt’s indigenous Christians, held protected status and played a key role in the booming textile industry, especially in Christian-majority cities like Tinnis and Damietta. Non-Muslims held court positions, and Jewish women, like the entrepreneur al-Wuhsha, were active in trade, travel, and religious life. Periods of tolerance were punctuated by persecution, most notably under al-Hakim, who enforced strict religious segregation.

===== Restrictions on women during al-Hakim's reign =====
During his reign (996–1021), Fatimid caliph al-Hakim bi-Amr Allah imposed increasingly severe restrictions on women's public presence. Beginning around 1000 CE, these measures escalated to include bans on women attending public baths, funerals, and markets. In 1013 CE, al-Hakim forbade all women from leaving their homes and even prohibited the production of women’s shoes. Some chroniclers reported harsh punishments for violators, including execution by drowning or immurement.

These decrees were not isolated. Al-Hakim also implemented broader policies aimed at curbing public entertainment, the consumption of wine, Christian festivals, and social mixing. He ordered the destruction of Christian churches, and enforced dress codes and social limitations on Jews and Christians. Scholars have noted that these restrictions extended to men as well and mainly impacted urban, lower-class women, while elite and aristocratic women rarely appeared in public regardless.

Several possible explanations for these restrictions have been proposed. Some historians attribute them to al-Hakim’s ascetic leanings and a desire to enforce stricter Islamic morality. Others suggest a strategic response to Cairo's social dynamics, particularly crowding in cemeteries, markets, and public events, which could threaten public health during a time of repeated famines, epidemics, and economic instability. Crowds of women in markets may have contributed to food shortages and price volatility, as women were primary household buyers. Al-Hakim's regulations possibly aimed to prevent hoarding, price inflation, and food spoilage. From 1009 to 1024, major famines and epidemics subsided, leading some to view his restrictive policies as harsh but effective.

==== The Ayyubid Sultanate ====
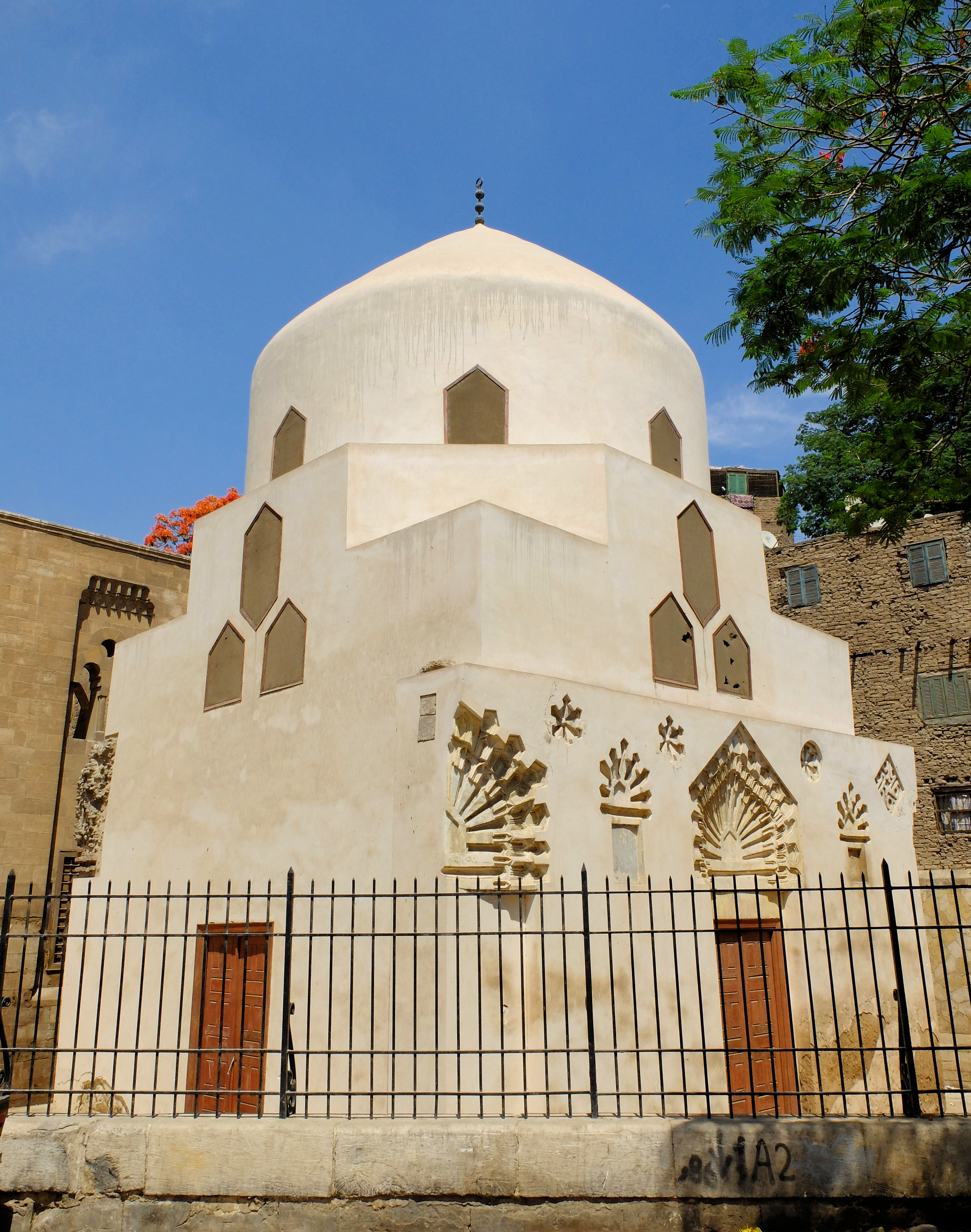
The Tomb of Shajar al-Durr, Cairo, ca. 1250--1251

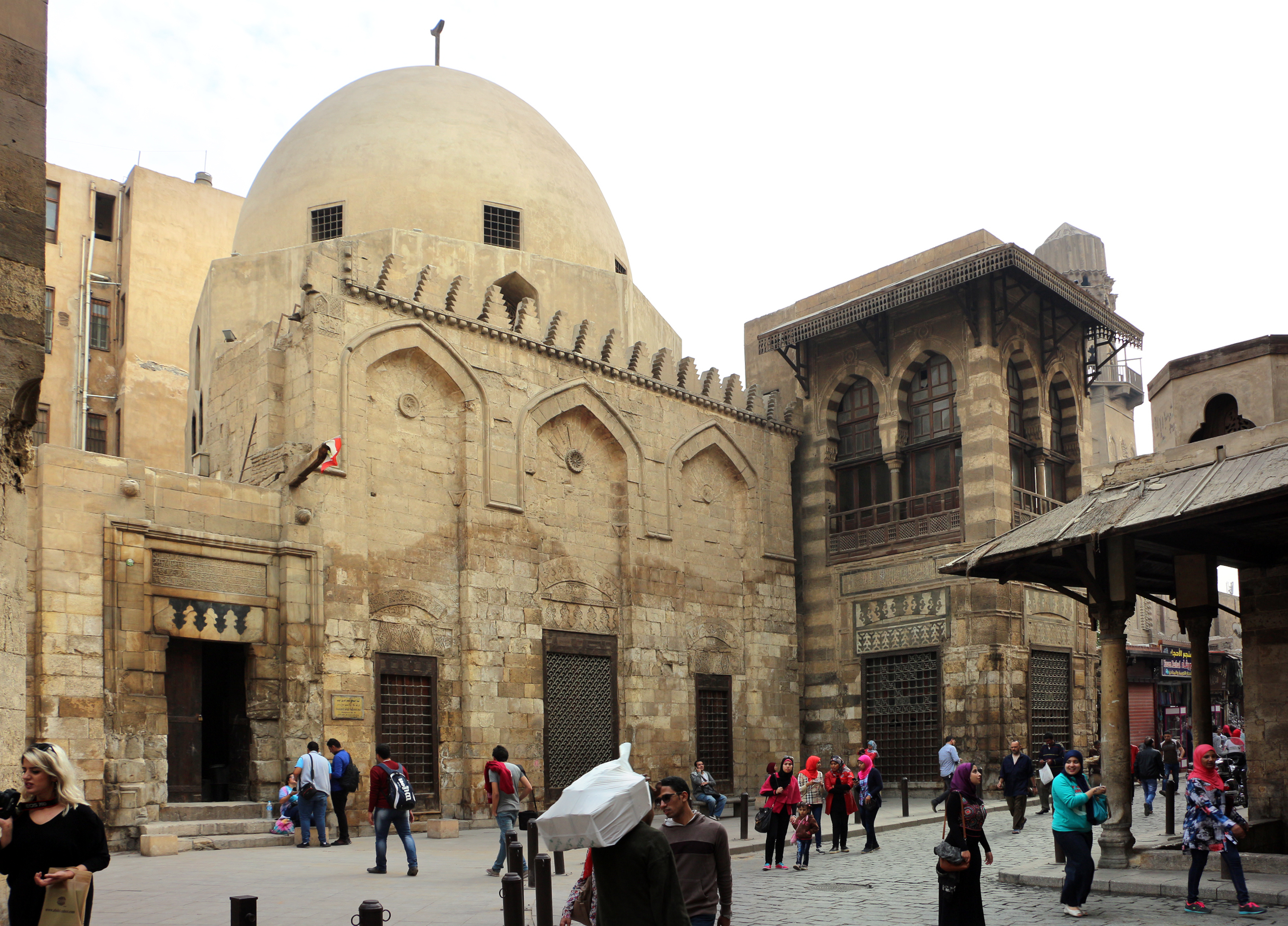
The Mausoleum of as-Salih Najm ad-Din Ayyub, Cairo, ca. 1249

Shajar al-Durr (d. 1257) was a notable female ruler in Islamic history who briefly reigned as Sultan of Egypt during the transitional period between Ayyubid and Mamluk rule. Originally a slave of Turkic origin, she rose to prominence as the concubine, and later the wife, of Sultan al-Salih Ayyub. Her political influence grew significantly during his reign, especially as she managed state affairs in his absence. Following al-Salih Ayyub’s death in 1249 amidst the Seventh Crusade, Shajar al-Durr concealed the news of his death to maintain political stability, securing the army’s loyalty and arranging for his son, Turanshah, to assume the throne. When Turanshah proved incapable and antagonistic toward the established Mamluk elite, he was assassinated. In 1250, with the support of the Mamluk military, Shajar al-Durr was proclaimed sultana, making her one of the few women in Islamic history to hold such power. Her rule, however, lasted only three months because it faced opposition from religious authorities and political rivals, notably the Abbasid Caliph in Baghdad, who rejected the legitimacy of female leadership. To bolster her position and legitimize her rule, she married the Mamluk general Aybak and shared power with him. Shajar al-Durr continued to exert significant influence even after Aybak assumed the sultanate, effectively controlling Egypt’s treasury and political affairs. When Aybak later sought to marry another woman, Shajar al-Durr had him assassinated. In retaliation, she was killed shortly afterward by his supporters. Aside from her political role, Shajar al-Durr was also a significant patron of architecture. She used her wealth and influence to commission mausoleums for herself and her late husband, Sultan al-Salih Ayyub.

==== The Mamluk Sultanate ====
During the Mamluk period (1250–1517), women were expected to acquire basic religious knowledge to fulfill obligations such as prayer and fasting. Although many women were benefactors of madrasas (formal educational institutions developed from the 11th century onward), they did not study or teach in them. Women were excluded from the professions that madrasas were designed to prepare students for, such as litigation, judging, and administration. Instead, many women pursued education in informal settings like homes and mosques, often learning from family members or other women. Women played a significant role in transmitting hadith, with some, such as 'A'isha bint 'Abd al-Hadi, earning recognition from leading male scholars.

In fourteenth-century Cairo, women played active and visible roles in both private and public life, participating in childbirth rituals, funerary practices, religious festivals, and social outings that often blended Islamic customs with local traditions. Much of what is known about their behavior, rituals, and public presence comes from conservative scholars like Ibn al-Hajj, who sharply criticized what he saw as their transgressions of Islamic norms. According to his accounts, Cairene women frequently neglected their appearance at home, instead reserving their finest clothing, jewelry, and perfumes for public display. The public bath served as a key site for female self-presentation and competition. Women were also central to funerary rituals, many of which echoed ancient Egyptian traditions. Female specialists prepared the deceased, and mourning periods could last up to a year. Visiting tombs, especially the shrines of saints, was a common devotional practice. Women actively took part in religious festivals and Sufi gatherings, some of which were even led by female Sufis, featuring mystical chanting, music, storytelling, and ecstatic physical expressions. In addition to religious activities, Cairene women enjoyed recreational outings to gardens, riverbanks, and public spaces. Boat rides and park gatherings offered opportunities for socializing and celebration, although these, too, were often met with disapproval from conservative male authorities.

==== The Ottoman Empire ====
Under Ottoman rule (1517–1798), Egypt became an important province within the empire, but governance remained shaped by a hybrid structure in which former Mamluks continued to wield significant influence alongside appointed Ottoman officials. This period saw the continuation of many Mamluk-era institutions and social structures, including those that shaped women's roles.

For elite Muslim women, particularly those in prominent Mamluk and wealthy merchant households, the period offered continued opportunities for economic and social influence. Despite persistent Orientalist stereotypes of the harem as a space of seclusion and passivity, many elite women in 17th- and 18th-century Cairo exercised considerable authority. Islamic law continued to guarantee them property rights, legal personhood, and access to the court system. Women could own, inherit, and endow property as waqfs, which allowed them to preserve wealth and influence public life by funding religious, educational, or charitable institutions. Elite women played prominent roles as patrons and administrators (naziras) of such endowments. Contrary to Western assumptions, harem women were not confined; veiled, they moved freely in public to attend bathhouses, religious festivities, and visit friends and relatives. While the public sphere remained gender-segregated, many women participated in the urban economy, invested in real estate, and maintained control over significant assets. Their status and influence often stemmed not only from personal wealth and legal rights but also from strategic family ties within the Mamluk-Ottoman elite.

Non-elite women in Ottoman Egypt remain relatively understudied. The face veil, often associated with seclusion, actually served as a marker of status and was typically worn by middle- and upper-class women. In contrast, rural women generally did not veil, as they worked in the fields to support their families. Textile production was the primary industry in both villages and towns. Spinning was a specialized task largely carried out by women, who would buy raw materials at the market, spin them at home, and return to sell the finished yarn. Urban investors, including women, often financed rural industries and trade. In terms of landownership, Islamic inheritance law entitled women to half the share of male heirs. However, in practice (particularly in Lower Egypt) succession often followed a patrilineal pattern, particularly with land, because households were registered under the name of a male patriarch, usually the oldest capable man. Women inherited land only in the absence of an adult male heir in the household.

=== Women in 19th-century Egypt ===
Throughout the 19th century, Egyptian women’s roles were shaped by a complex mix of legal, social, and economic forces during a time of Egyptian modernization and centralization. From Muhammad Ali’s early reforms to the shifts in gender norms later in the century, women were expected to conform to increasingly strict patriarchal ideals. Despite those restrictions, many women found ways to protect their rights and assert their voices, especially through the legal system and everyday forms of resistance.

==== Early 1800s: legal reforms and gendered authority ====
During the rule of Muhammad Ali (1805–1848), Egypt underwent a series of reforms aimed at building a stronger, more centralized state. These reforms promoted a more patriarchal model of society that reinforced male control over households and limited women’s roles to the private, domestic sphere. The state supported a family structure in which men held exclusive legal and economic authority, while women were treated as dependents under their male guardians.

Despite this, women still actively used Islamic courts to protect their rights. Shariʿa law remained the legal framework for any family matters, and court records show that women often filed lawsuits for unpaid dowries (mahr), sought divorce in cases of abuse or neglect, and fought male relatives for their rightful inheritance. Widows, in particular, frequently used the courts to defend their claims to property from fathers or brothers of their late husbands. These cases reveal that women were not passive victims of the legal system, but rather knew how to navigate it strategically to protect themselves and assert their autonomy.

==== Mid-1800s: labor and resistance in a changing legal landscape ====
In the mid-19th century, Egypt’s expanding legal administration introduced new layers of state authority. At the same time, many women, especially from working-class or rural backgrounds, continued to contribute to the economy in crucial, though often unrecognized, ways. Women worked as weavers, street vendors, midwives, washerwomen, and domestic servants. In cities like Cairo, unmarried or widowed women often supported their families through small-scale commerce or market-based labor.

Even though their labor was important to everyday life, women still faced strict social norms and legal challenges. Some were pushed into forced marriages by male guardians, while others were imprisoned under vague charges like “immorality” or “public disorder.” Legal records from this time show that women continued to challenge these restrictions in court. They protested forced marriages and petitioned for their release—or the release of relatives—from jail. These cases demonstrate that many women refused to accept state or family control without question.

In addition to legal resistance, women found informal ways to create independence. Some established religious endowments (waqf) to manage property, while others took on roles as guardians or caretakers within extended family networks. It wasn’t uncommon for widowed or divorced women to form their own female-dominant households, a move that directly pushed back against the male-led family model promoted by the state.

==== Late 1800s: state surveillance and shifting ideals of femininity ====
By the late 19th century, the Egyptian government increased its efforts to regulate women’s presence in public spaces. Women who worked in occupations like dancing, performing, or serving in coffeehouses were viewed as threats to public morality. These women were often monitored by police, arrested, or even subjected to forced relocation or institutionalization. The state aimed to maintain public order by limiting women’s visibility, especially in roles that challenged the ideal of a modest, domestic woman.

This period also saw the state promoting new gender ideals through the education system. The government began opening girls’ schools, but the curriculum focused on training girls to be obedient wives and mothers. Lessons emphasized moral behavior, sewing, and domestic duties rather than intellectual, professional, or political development. Education reform became a tool for the government to shape how women were expected to behave and reinforced the idea that their proper place was in the home.

Despite growing restrictions, this era also marked the beginning of a new kind of activism. Educated women began using writing and publishing to push for change. Writers like Zaynab Fawwaz and Hind Nawfal emerged as some of the first Egyptian women to publicly advocate for expanded rights. Fawwaz wrote biographies of influential women and called for girls’ education as a way to improve society. Nawfal founded al-Fatāt (The Young Woman), one of the earliest Egyptian women’s journals, which included essays on morality, literature, and social issues.

Omar Lotfy (1867–1911), an Egyptian lawyer and intellectual, addressed women's rights in his 1897 treatise Haqq al-Mar'a (Women's Rights), based on a lecture he had delivered in French in September 1896. The work examined women's rights under Islamic law and compared them with those of women in Western societies at the time.

These writers represented the start of a feminist awakening that would grow stronger in the 20th century. Their work built on the experiences of the countless women before them who had defended their rights in court, supported their families through labor, and challenged societal expectations in everyday ways.

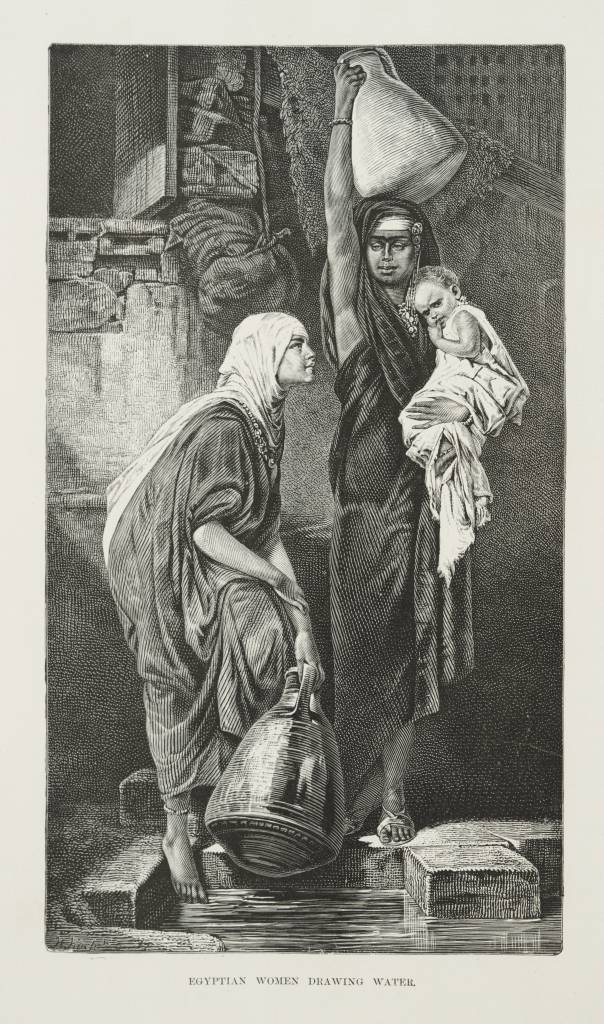
Two women holding large water jugs. (1878)

=== Women in 20th-century Egypt ===
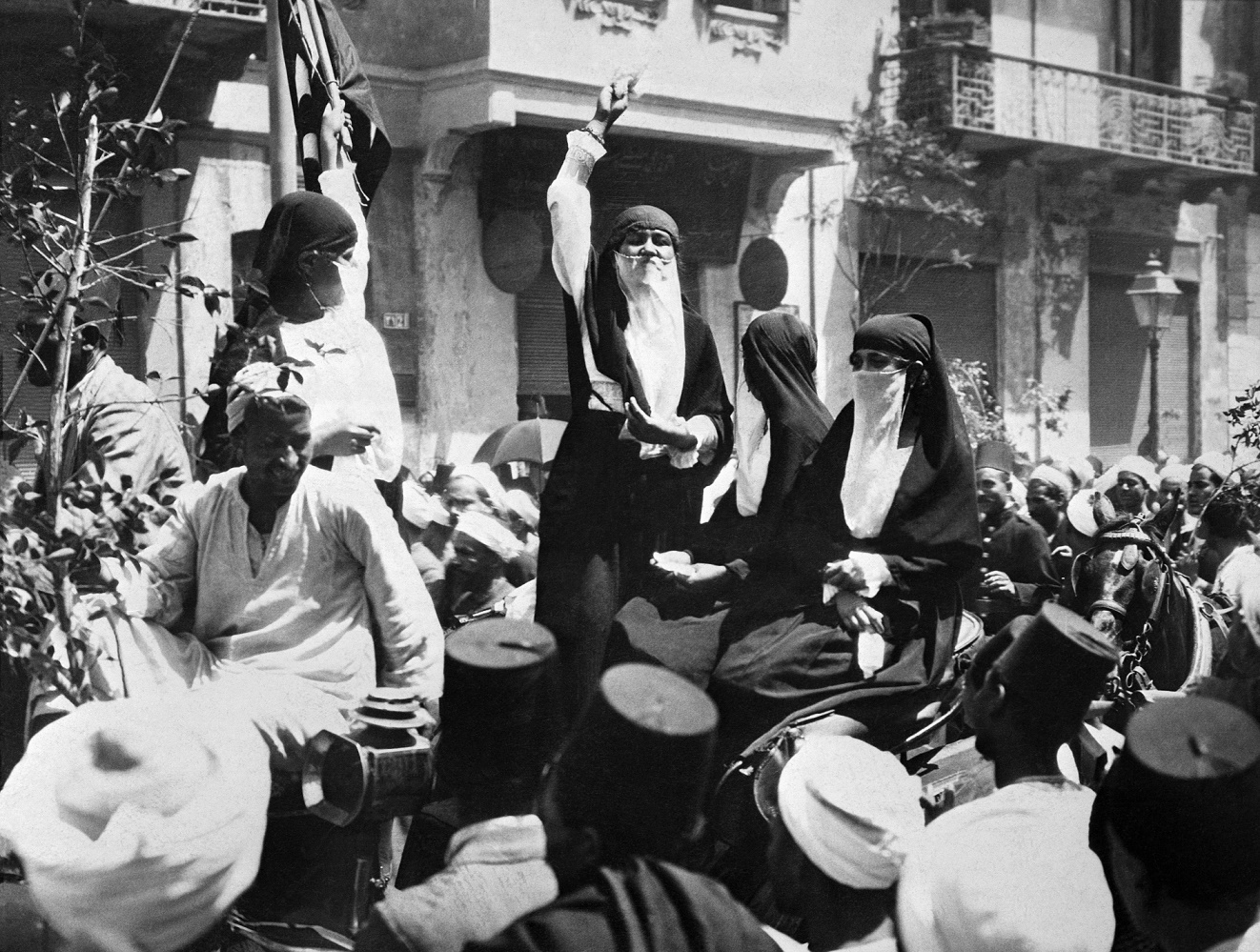
Harem women make public speeches - "This is the first time that Egyptian women have been permitted freedom of speech in public" - June 1919

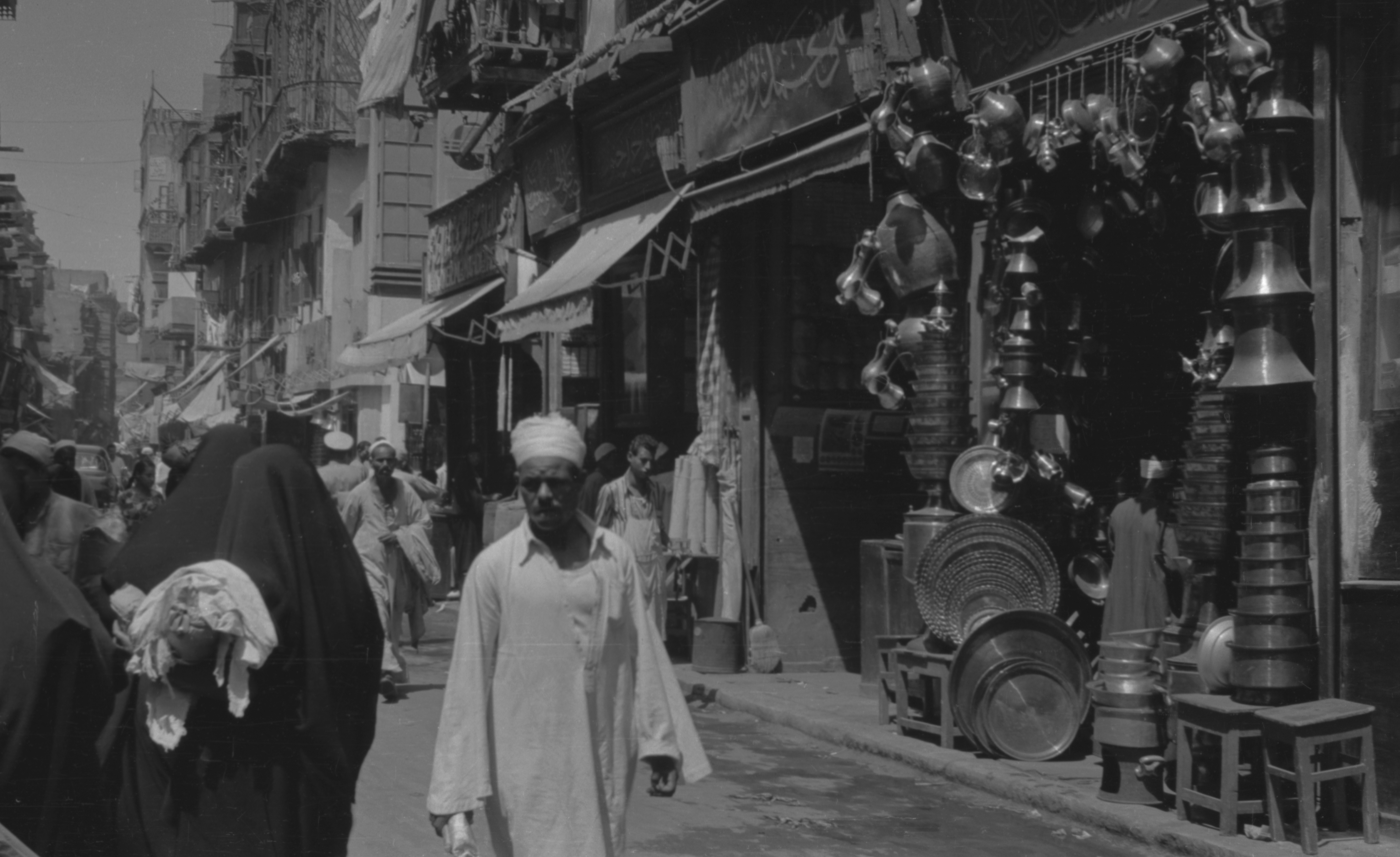
Everyday life in Cairo during the 1950s - women covered with veils

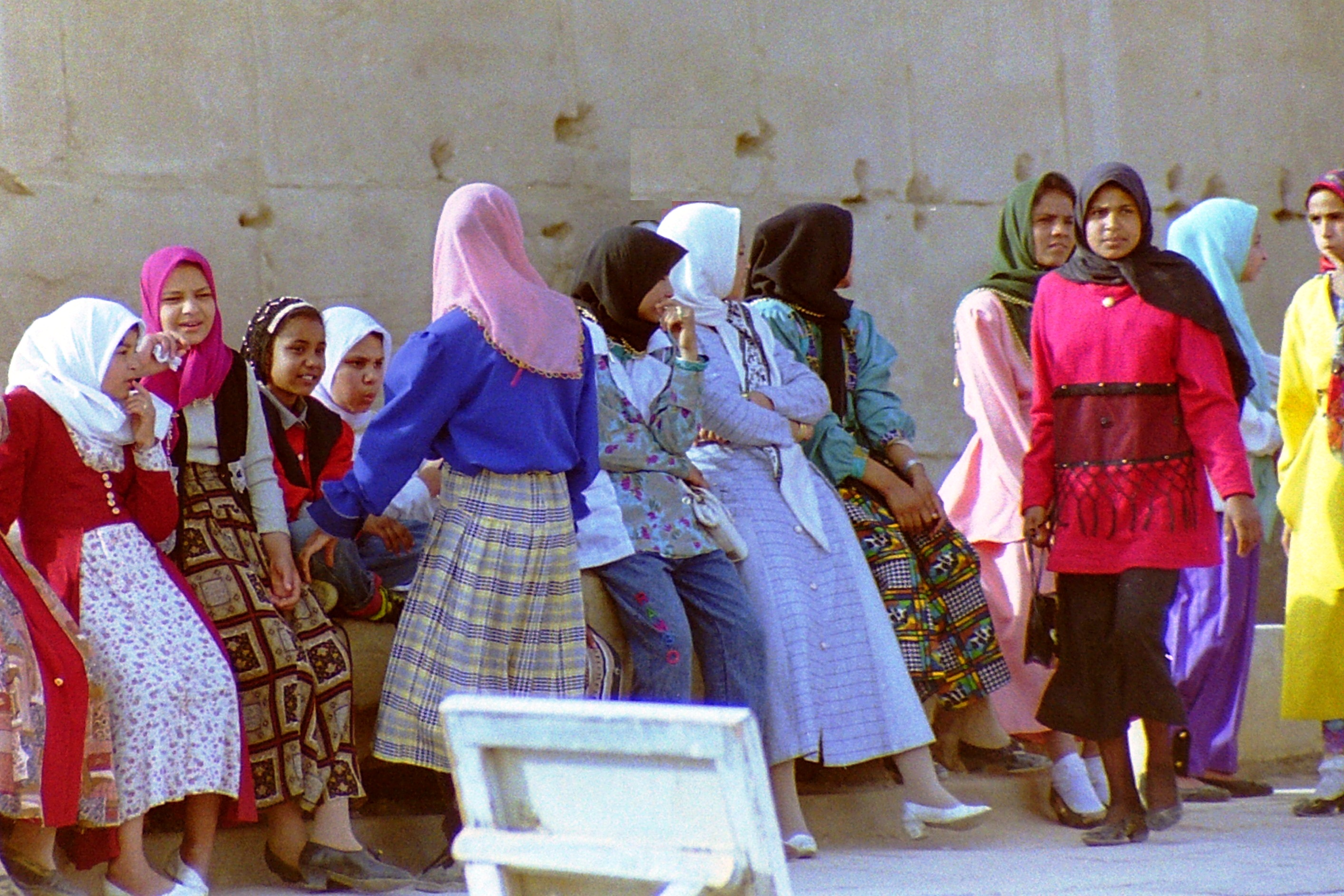
School girls visiting the Egyptian Temple of Isis from Philae Island (1995).

The rule of Gamal Abdul Nasser was characterized by his policy of stridently advocating women's rights through welfare-state policies, labeled as state feminism. Women were guaranteed the right to vote and equality of opportunity was explicitly stated in the 1956 Egyptian constitution, forbidding gender-based discrimination. Labor laws were changed to ensure women's standing in the work force and maternity leave was legally protected. At the same time, the state repressed independent feminist organizations, leaving a dearth of female political representation.

The economic liberalization plan of the Sadat regime resulted in the collapse of this system and the resurgence of Islamist-influenced policy. While the Nasserist years allowed a wide range of study for women, Sadat's policies narrowed the opportunities available to women. Unemployment for women changed from 5.8% 1960 to 40.7% in 1986. In place of policies to economically support women during pregnancy, women were encouraged to leave work entirely or work part-time.

The Mubarak years were marked by further erosion of women's rights and status. Preserved parliamentary seats for women and the 1979 personal status law were repealed in 1987, a new watered-down law taking its place that allowed less power for women in cases of divorce.

== Modern status ==
To limit women's contact with men as tradition, practices such as veiling and gender segregation at schools, work, and recreation have become common. Furthermore, lower-class families, especially in Upper-Egypt, have tended to withdraw females from school as they reached puberty to minimize their interaction with males. Lower-class men frequently preferred marriage to women who had been secluded rather than to those who had worked or attended secondary school.

Most women in Egypt have adopted some form of veiling, with a majority of Egyptian women covering at least their hair with the hijab; however covering the face with a niqāb is only practiced by a minority of women (see Niqāb in Egypt).

A 2010 Pew Research Center poll showed that 45% of Egyptian men and 76% of women supported gender equality. The same poll showed that, in principle, people tend to accept a woman's right to work outside the home, with 61% of the respondents agreeing that "women should be able to work outside the home", but at the same time showing some reservations, with only 11% of men and 36% of women completely agreeing with that statement; and 75% agreeing that "when jobs are scarce, men should have more right to a job". Polls taken in 2010 and 2011 show that 39% considered gender equality "very important" to Egypt's future post-revolution and 54% of Egyptians supported sex segregation in the workplace.

In March 2021, Egypt became the first country in Africa and MENA region to launch the "Closing the Gender Gap Accelerator" in cooperation with the World Economic Forum, in order to reduce the gender gap in the labor market. Also in the same month, the amendments of Personal Status Law, which were proposed on 23 February, were rejected by feminist organizations as they would deprive women of the legal status to conclude a marriage contract. However, the new amendments ignored granting women financial and educational guardianship over their minor children, and for Christian women, their denial of custody over their children, when their husbands convert to Islam.

=== Health ===
As of 2022 estimates, women's life expectancy in Egypt is 73 years, compared to 68 years for men.

In the late 20th century, Egypt's women's health policies became increasingly shaped by international development agendas, particularly through the influence of U.S. foreign aid agencies like USAID. Framing rapid population growth as a threat to economic stability, these programs prioritized fertility reduction over broader health or social reforms. As a result, family planning initiatives heavily targeted women, especially in rural and low-income areas, emphasizing long-term, provider-controlled contraceptives such as IUDs, Depo-Provera injections, and Norplant. These methods were favored over less invasive or user-controlled options and largely excluded male contraceptive methods like condoms or vasectomy. Egyptian women were often viewed as unreliable users of oral contraceptives, reinforcing a shift toward methods that minimized user input and extended institutional control over reproductive decisions. While the programs were publicly framed as promoting women’s autonomy and health, critics argue that they often reduced women’s reproductive agency. By the early 1990s, the total fertility rate (TFR) in Egypt had declined from 6.6 children per woman in the late 1960s to 3.9, and the contraceptive prevalence rate among married women rose to 47%. As of 2024, the TFR stands at 2.92 children per woman, with a contraception prevalence rate of 60.3% (in 2008). Skilled healthcare professionals attend 91.5% of live births, while the maternal mortality rate is 17 deaths per 100,000 live births.

Egypt criminalizes abortion under Articles 260–264 of the 1937 Penal Code, allowing it only when the pregnancy poses a threat to the mother's life. Reliable statistics on the number of unsafe abortions are unavailable, making it challenging to assess the impact of restrictive abortion laws on women's health.

=== Education ===
During Classical Antiquity and the Islamic Middle Ages, women in Egypt had limited access to formal education. This situation began to change following Egypt's interactions with Western colonial powers, which initiated processes of modernization and nationalization.

In 1832, during the reign of Muhammad Ali, the School of Hakimas (women doctors) was founded with the aim of training female medical practitioners to serve women patients. The school emphasized obstetrics, and its graduates were licensed to administer vaccinations, deliver babies, and provide medical care to women and children free of charge. The government facilitated marriages between female graduates of the School of Hakimas and male graduates of the School of Medicine, assigning the couples to the same district and providing them with housing.

At the time, the School of Hakimas was the only state-supported educational institution available to women. Upper-class families sometimes hired private tutors from Europe, while missionary schools, established in the 1830s and 1840s, educated an estimated 5,570 girls by 1875, with the majority of their students being Copts.

The government established its first primary school for girls in 1873, followed by a secondary school in 1874. However, the expansion of education slowed after the British occupation began in 1882. Despite growing demand for education, the British administration significantly increased tuition fees. Consequently, private and missionary schools became the dominant educational providers, often favoring male students. By 1897, government schools enrolled 11,000 male students and 863 female students, while benevolent societies provided education to 181,000 boys and 1,164 girls.

Several Western-educated Egyptian intellectuals argued that women's education was crucial for Egypt's progress as a modern nation. Notable advocates included Rifa'a at-Tahtawi, who wrote Egypt's first coeducational textbook, and education reformer Ali Mubarak. The most influential figure was Qasim Amin, whose works are regarded as foundational to feminism in Egypt. In his 1899 book The Liberation of Women, Amin argued that providing primary education to women would benefit society by enabling mothers to raise more educated sons.

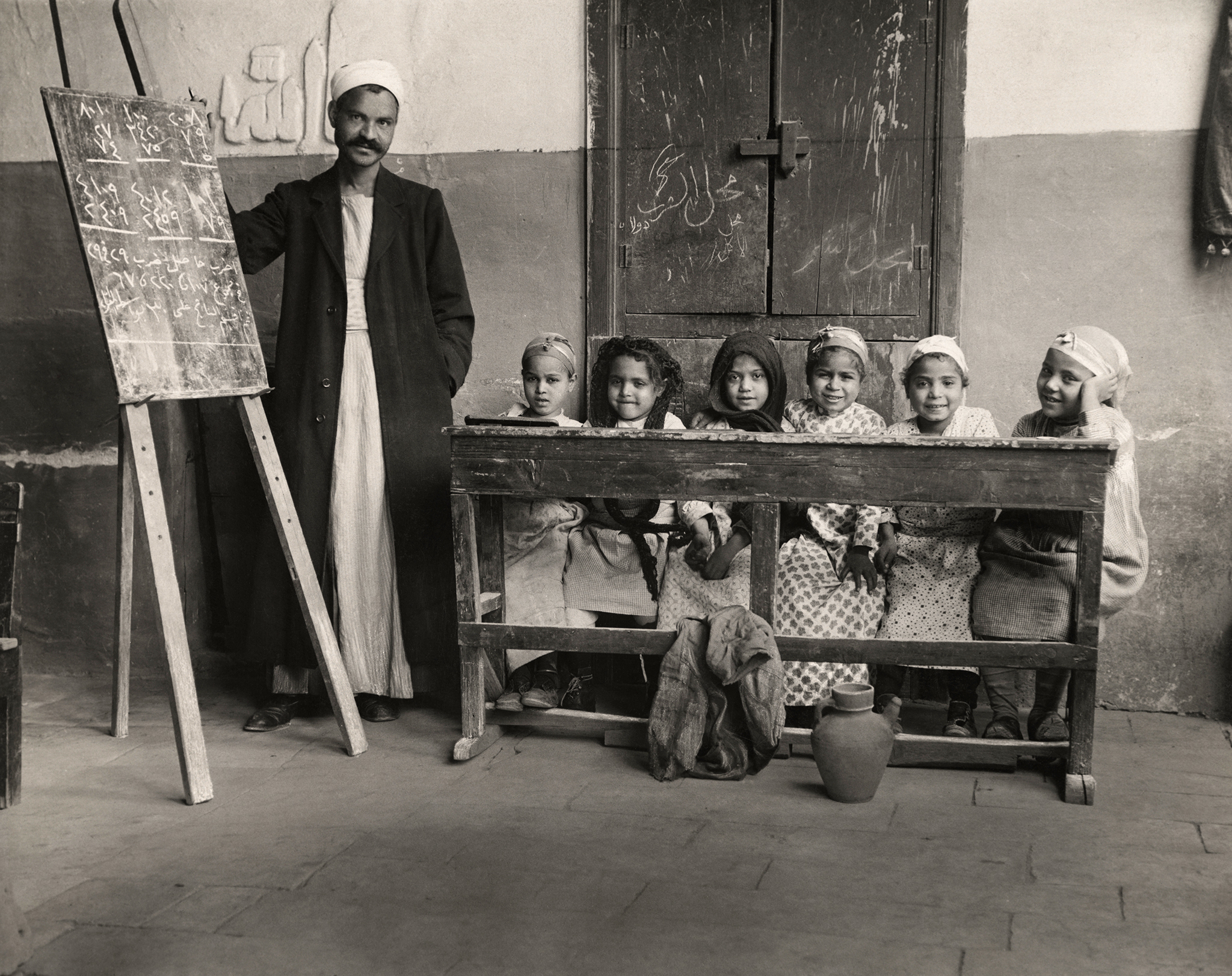
Six girls in a classroom learning Arabic from a male teacher, Cairo, 1922.

In 1923, the government identified education as a key priority and, by 1925, mandated compulsory primary schooling for both boys and girls. Women were admitted to universities in the late 1920s, and in 1933, the first female students graduated from Fuad University. Efforts to expand women's education were championed by the Egyptian Feminist Union, founded by Huda Sha'rawi in 1923. The organization funded scholarships for young women to study in Europe, operated a primary school for girls, assisted with educational expenses, and organized vocational training for economically disadvantaged young women. Nevertheless, despite a rapid increase in school enrollments during the first half of the 20th century, literacy rates remained low due to Egypt's population growth.

Following the 1952 revolution, the government introduced compulsory primary education for children aged six to twelve and implemented coeducation at the primary level. Education was declared free at all levels, including university, with admission based on academic merit rather than gender. Financial assistance was provided to those in need, and employment was guaranteed for university graduates. As a result, female participation in education rose dramatically, with female enrollment growing faster than that of males. By 1967, 80% of primary-school-age children attended school, and the gender gap had narrowed to two males for every female by the 1970s. The male-to-female ratio in higher education dropped from 13.2 to 1 in 1953-1954 to 1.8 to 1 by 1976.

As of 2024, the Global Gender Gap Report indicates that 99.68% of Egyptian women are enrolled in primary education, compared to 99.41% of men. In secondary education, enrollment stands at 84.02% for women and 87.10% for men. Women also surpass men in higher education enrollment, with 38.03% of women attending universities versus 37.61% of men. Women are a majority among university graduates in the fields of education (69.15%), health and welfare (55.95%), and natural sciences, mathematics, and statistics (64.16%).

The literacy rate of women (aged 15 and over) is 69%, which is lower than that of men which is 80% (data from 2022). Egypt is largely rural country, with only 43% of the population being urban (in 2023), and access to education is poor in rural areas.

=== Employment ===
Egypt has one of the lowest female labor force participation rates globally. Although women constitute nearly half of Egypt's population, their labor force participation rate is only about 15%, whereas men's participation stands at 69.2%, as reported in the 2024 Global Gender Gap Report. Despite rapid progress in gender equality in education and healthcare, Egypt (like other countries in the MENA region) continues to face challenges in increasing women's workforce participation. This issue is referred to as the MENA gender-equality paradox.

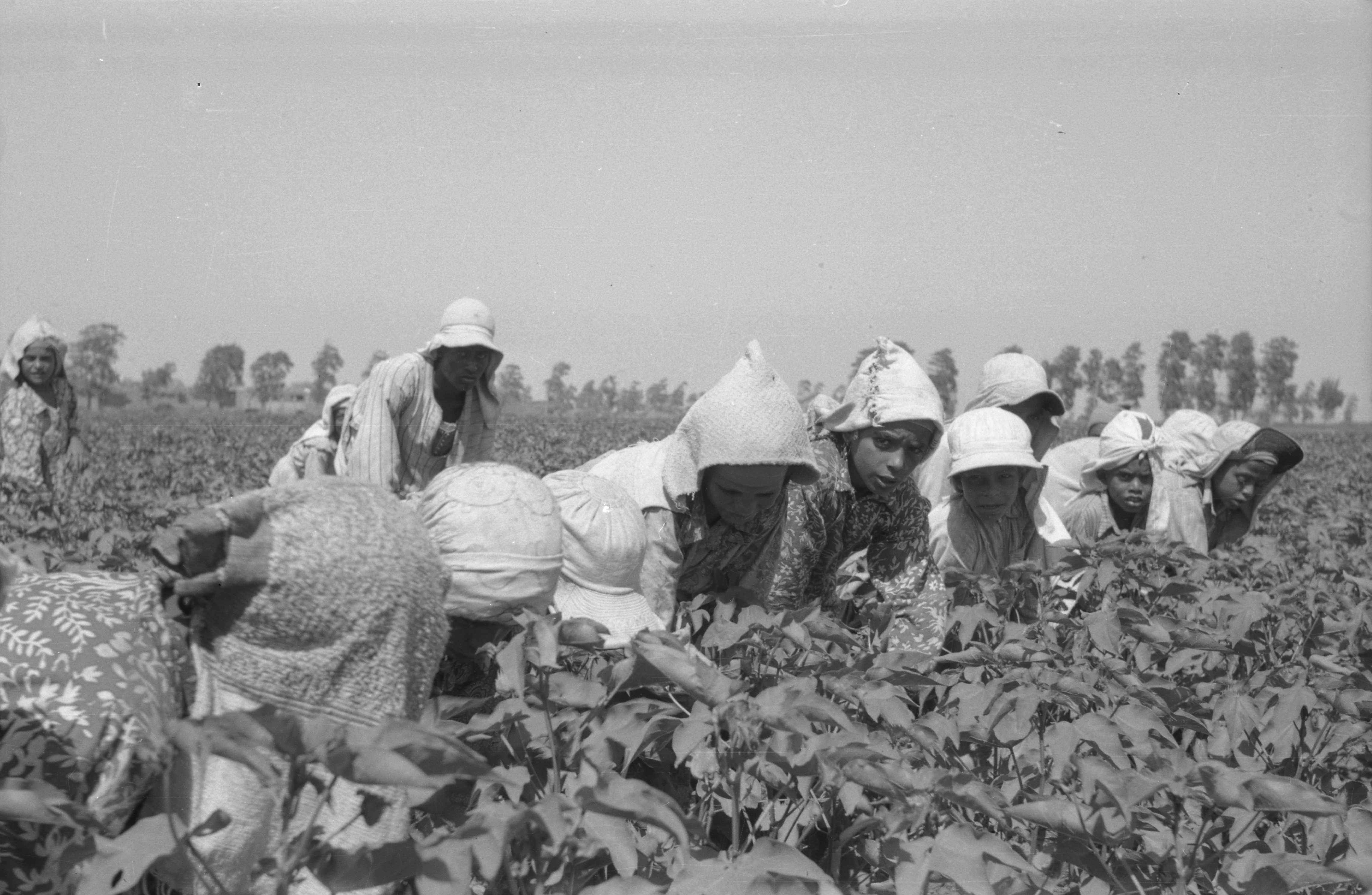
Farmers picking cotton in Egypt in the 1950's.

Resistance to female employment in Egypt is often linked to cultural and religious values, particularly those concerning male dignity. The Quran portrays men as the protectors and primary financial providers for women, leading to the perception that a woman working outside the home reflects her husband's inability to fulfill his role. Journalist Leslie T. Chang, who has written about Egyptian textile factories, notes that many young women take jobs mainly to save for marriage rather than to build long-term careers. For many, the ideal remains becoming a sitt bayt, or housewife.

Another major factor contributing to low female labor force participation and rising unemployment is the decline in public sector job opportunities. Since the 1960s, President Gamal Abdel Nasser’s policy of guaranteeing jobs for all high school and university graduates made the public sector a major employer of women, with approximately 40% of working women employed in this sector. Public sector jobs are considered more desirable as they offer greater job security, labor protections, and benefits such as maternity leave. In contrast, private-sector employment is often viewed as unsafe for women, subjecting them to moral scrutiny and social stigma. Additionally, in the private sector there is little to no labor rights for women and companies are less likely to hire women because of implied “associated costs” such as childcare and maternity leave. Thus, women are discriminated against in the workforce and not given an opportunity to pursue their desired careers. That goes for women with or without education because jobs can be attained at various levels, but the preference goes to their male counterparts.

=== Political participation ===
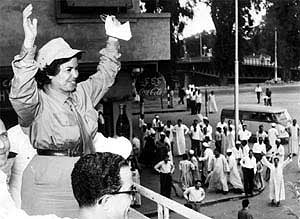
Egyptian officer Rawya Ateya, in military dress, waves to her supporters during her 1957 electoral campaign. She ended up winning in her Cairo constituency, thereby becoming the first ever female Member of Parliament in Egypt and the Arab world.

Women in Egypt gained the right to vote and stand for political office in 1956 as part of the Arab socialism policies adopted by the government following the 1952 revolution, which emphasized social equality between genders. By 1957, two women, Rawya Attia and Amina Shukri, had been elected to the National Assembly, and in 1962, Hikmat Abu Zaid was appointed Minister of Social Affairs by Nasser, becoming the first woman to hold a ministerial position in Egypt. Until 1979, men were automatically registered on the electoral list, while women were included only upon request.

A constitutional referendum was held in Egypt in 2012. A constituent assembly was elected which drafted the new constitution. Of the 100 members of the assembly, only 7 were women. After the 2013 Egyptian coup d'état another constituent assembly was elected for a constitutional referendum in which 5 of the 50 members were women.

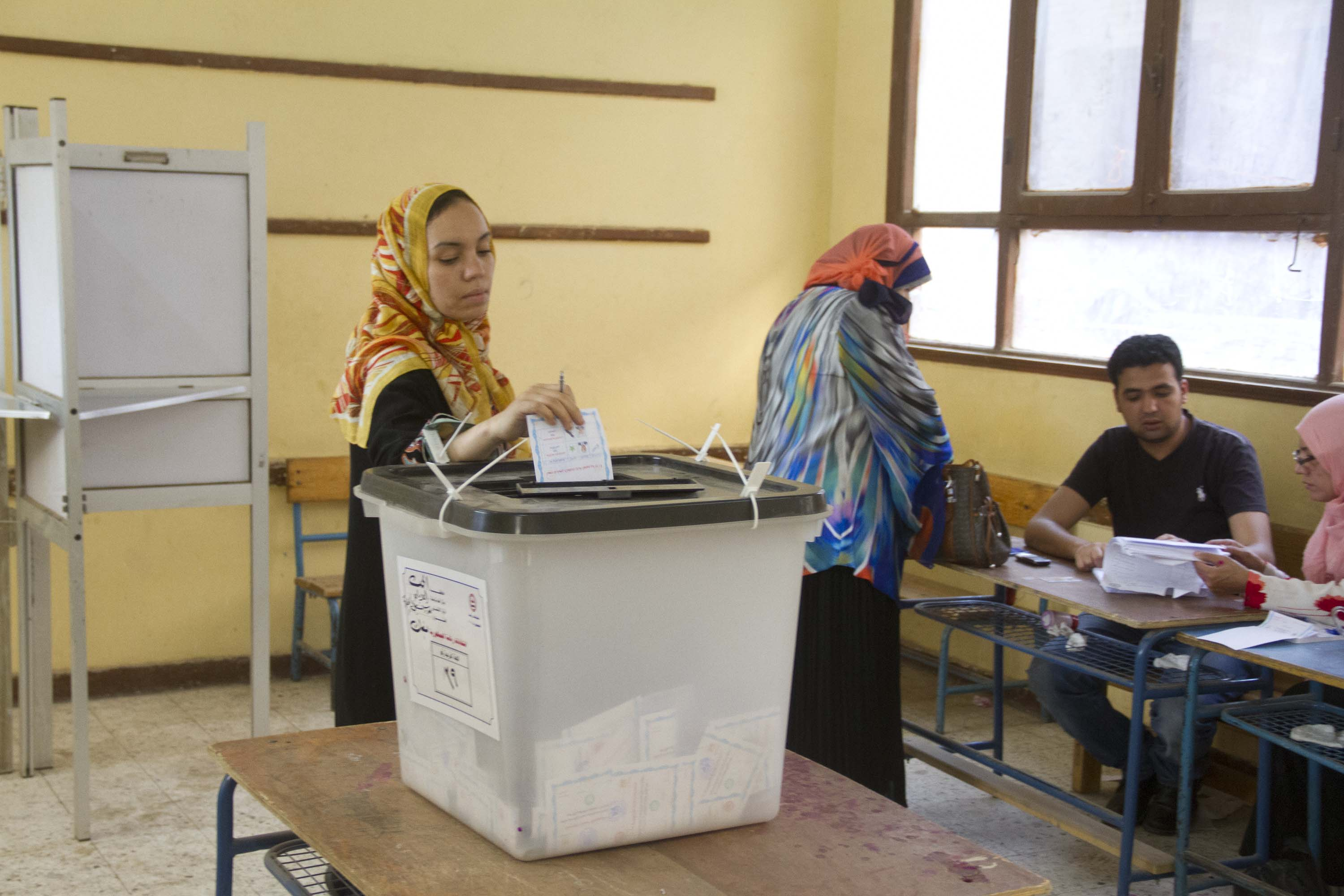
Women vote in Cairo, 27 May 2014.

In the 2015 Egyptian parliamentary election women won 75 of the 568 seats up for election. A further 14 women and 14 men were appointed by president Sisi. With a percentage of 14.9%, it was the highest representation of women in Egyptian parliament yet.

As of 2023, women occupy 164 out of 592 parliamentary seats in Egypt, representing 27.7% of the total.

=== Violence against women ===
==== Political violence and institutional abuse ====
On 23 June 2020, Egyptian security forces detained prominent activist Sanaa Seif from outside the general prosecutor's office in the capital, Cairo, where she was waiting to file a complaint about being physically assaulted outside Cairo's Tora Prison complex on 22 June 2020.

==== Sexual violence and sexual harassment ====
In a 2010 survey of 1,010 women by the Egyptian Center for Women's rights, 98% of foreign women and 83% of native women said they had been sexually harassed in Egypt and two-thirds of men said that they had harassed women. In 2013, the United Nations Entity for Gender Equality and the Empowerment of Women reported that 99.3% of Egyptian women had experienced some form of harassment.

==== Forced virginity tests ====
In December 2011, the Cairo Administrative court ruled that forced virginity tests on females in military prisons were illegal. The case involved Samira Ibrahim who participated at a sit-in at Tahrir Square on March 9, 2011. Ibrahim described the degrading experience of having a virginity test be conducted on her in front of military soldiers. Several other female protestors received similar treatment (see 2011 virginity tests of protestors in Egypt). In its World Report 2020, the Human Rights Watch reported that virginity tests still occurred in the country.

==== Sexual assault ====
Human Rights Watch reported 91 sexual assaults in four days from 30 June 2013 during the Tahrir Square protests, as well as 19 cases of mob sexual assaults in January. The deputy Middle East director at HRW said that the attacks were "holding women back from participating fully in the public life of Egypt at a critical point in the country's development." On 4 June 2013, a law criminalizing sexual harassment for the first time in modern Egyptian history was approved by then interim president, Adly Mansour.

The 2014 Cairo hotel gang rape case in which a young woman was drugged and raped by a group of young men from wealthy families attracted wide social media and mainstream media attention, leading to the extradition of three of the accused men from Lebanon back to Egypt in September 2020. Egyptian Streets called the attention a #MeToo moment. In 2020 a social media campaign "Assault Police" was launched so that women could anonymously draw attention to perpetrators of sexual violence. The account was started by Nadeen Ashraf who wanted to enable women to have a voice and make their concerns heard.

In July 2021, several women opened up about their sexual abuse incidents during an interview with The New York Times. The women revealed that they were sexually abused in police stations, hospitals and prisons during routine searches by the police or prison guards and by state-employed doctors during invasive physical exams and virginity tests.

In August 2021, Egyptian President Abdel Fattah el-Sisi ratified law amendments to tighten the imprisonment term and the fine imposed on sexual harassment. However, Sisi's recent ratification is dismissed in a 2022 court case against famous Egyptian actor Shady Khalaf, who was charged with only 3 years of prison sentencing for his sexual assault and attempted rapes on "seven women at an acting workshop."

==== Honor killings ====
Honor killings take place in Egypt relatively frequently, due to reasons such as a woman meeting an unrelated man, even if this is only an allegation; or adultery (real or suspected). For example, in 2021, a man was convicted and sentenced to five years in prison for thinking his sister's behavior was "suspicious" and murdering her—a murder to which he claimed was an "honor killing."

Honor killings are also listed in the Egyptian Penal Code, under Article 237, in which courts are allowed to be more lenient in their sentencing for honor killings made by men who catch their wives committing adultery. However, the same leniency is not granted for women under the Article.

==== Female genital mutilation ====
Female genital mutilation (FGM) is widespread in Egypt, with 87% of girls and women aged 15 to 49 years having undergone FGM in 2004–15, though the practice is less common among the youth. The practice is deeply ingrained in the culture and predates both Christianity and Islam. Its main purpose is to preserve chastity, though its social function is very complicated. FGM was banned in 2008, but enforcement of the law was weak. In 2012, UNICEF reported that 87% of Egyptian women and girls 15–49 years old had undergone female genital mutilation. In June 2013, 13-year-old Soheir al-Batea died after undergoing FGM. The doctor responsible for the procedure became the first doctor in Egypt to be tried for committing female genital mutilation. On November 20, 2014, he was found not guilty. In 2016, the law was tightened, making FGM a felony.

A 17-year-old girl died on 29 May 2017, reportedly from hemorrhaging, following female genital mutilation (FGM) at a private hospital in Suez Governorate. Four people faced trial on charges of causing lethal injury and FGM, including the girl's mother and medical staff as per an Amnesty 2016/2017 report.

In March 2021, the Egyptian Senate approved a new bill that would punish whoever conducts genital mutilation to five years in prison, while the act which results in a permanent handicap would lead to seven years with hard labor, and in case of death, the imprisonment should be no less than ten years. Women continued to lack adequate protection from sexual and gender-based violence, as well as gender discrimination in law and practice, particularly under personal status laws regulating divorce.

Female genital mutilation was criminalized in Egypt in 2008.

=== Sexual violence against LGBTQ Egyptians ===
With the rise of LGBTQ rallies and protests in Egypt, a light is also being shed on the rise of sexual violence against the community. Egypt also has a ninth Article in its Penal code that deems homosexuality a criminal act and punishment for it an imprisonment "from 6 months to three years" and the person convicted can end up staying in person for up to 12 years depending on their act of "habitual debauchery." In 2015, a Harvard paper written on the topic of LGBTQ members in Egypt suggests that the reasonings behind the country's resentment towards the community is that the country is "largely conservative" and that the hatred is "rooted in societal gender and sexual norms."

In 2017, it was reported that "dozens" of LGBTQ Egyptians were arrested under the government of el-Sisi, and were charged for "sexual deviance," "insulting public morals," and "debauchery" and arrested due to those charges. Also, on October of that same year, an Egyptian member of the Parliament put forth the introduction of a bill that "criminalizes homosexuality" and a total of 60 members were ready to approve it as they signed it.

In 2020, a "crackdown" of LGBTQ members in Egypt began by the government. Police forces "entraped" members of the community through "social networking sites and dating applications" and gave them "harsh prison sentences." The detainees were a subject of "verbal and physical abuse" by police, and were given "forced anal exams" and "virginity tests." One woman reported that, due to the sexual abuse she endured from police, she "bled for three days and could not walk for weeks." Some detainees also claimed that the police allowed other inmates to abuse and torture them.

=== Personal status laws ===
==== Inheritance ====
As sectarianism is embedded in the political and judicial system, Egypt does not have a unified family law. Different laws apply based on one's religion. In case of Muslim family law, when someone passes away, two-thirds of their estate is distributed according to compulsory inheritance rules, wherein Muslim women receive half the inheritance of what their brothers get.

In 2019, a Coptic Christian woman challenged the Islamic rules, arguing that since Egypt allows for Christians to settle their own matters without Islamic influence, Egypt's inheritance laws do not apply to her. The court ruled in her favor, marking a landmark case.

==== Marriage and divorce ====
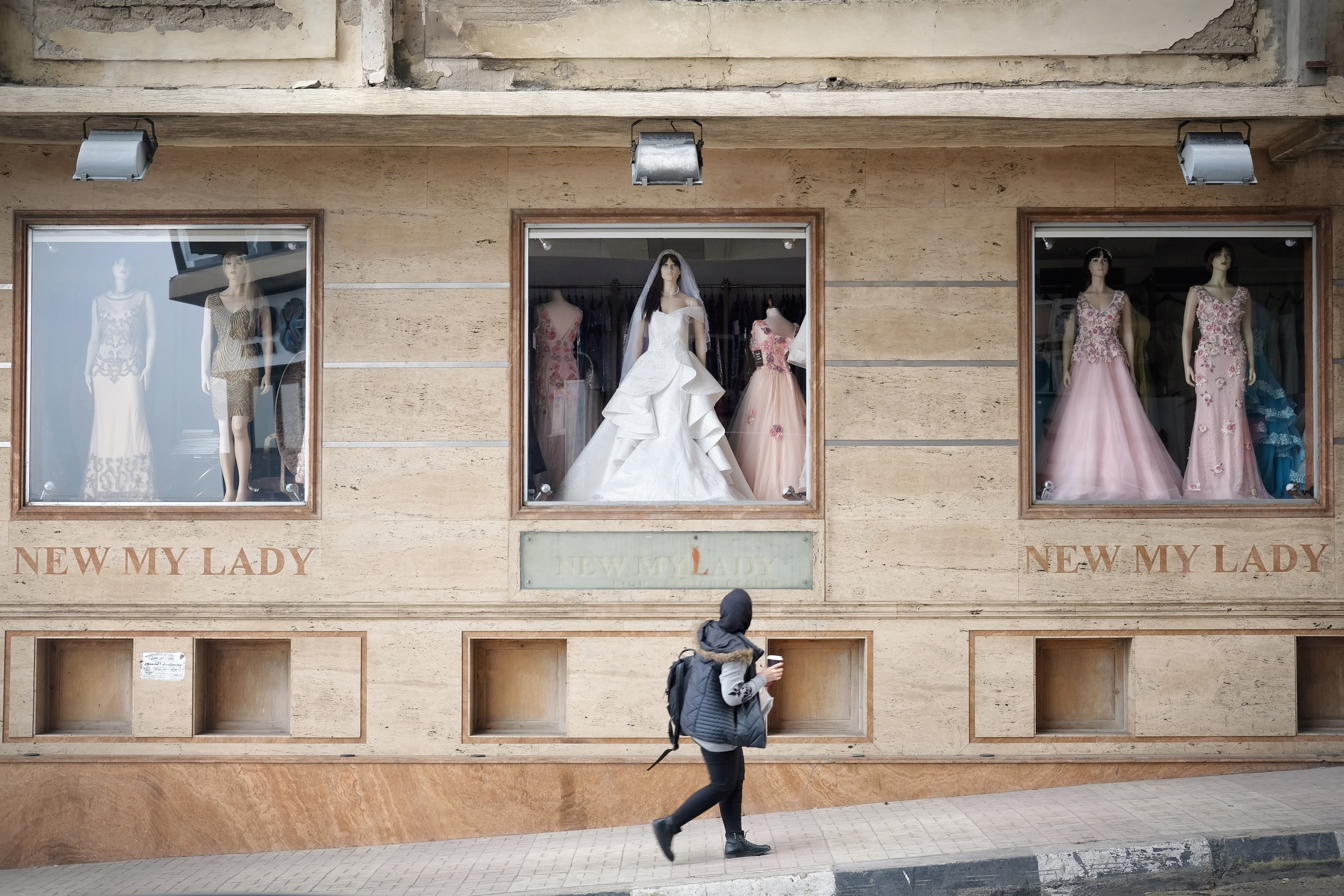
An Egyptian bridal boutique

Marriage was considered a very important part in ancient Egyptian society. Marriage was an almost completely private affair, and as a result, not many records of marriage were kept. Furthermore, not all Egyptian marriages were arranged, rather, most daughters had persuaded their families for their approval towards their future spouses.

Egyptian women who were married were highly acknowledged. It was common for females to marry after the age of menstruation, such as age 14. They were usually considered married after they had left the protection of their father's house. It had also been acknowledged that though the woman became under her spouse's care, her husband did not become her legal guardian and the woman remained independent while controlling her own assets. For the non-royal women in ancient Egypt, the title of wife also came with the title "Mistress of the House". The role as a wife included taking care of the household.

Egypt's laws pertaining to marriage and divorce have changed over the years, however they have generally favored the social position of men, although reform continues. Egypt retained the inclusion of Islamic law in dealings of family law, following on from its judicial and administrative independence from the Ottoman Empire in 1874. Muslim husbands were traditionally allowed to have up to four wives at a time in accordance with Islamic religious custom, but a woman could have only one husband at a time. A Muslim man could divorce his wife with ease by saying "I divorce thee" on three separate occasions in the presence of witnesses. The first reforms that changed this state of affairs came in the 1920s with Law No.25 of 1920 and 1929. These reforms included the following specifics regarding legitimate grounds for a woman requesting a divorce:

1. If her husband failed to provide maintenance. (nafaqah)
2. If her husband was found to have a dangerous or contagious disease.
3. If she was deserted by her husband.
4. If she was maltreated by her husband.

In 1971, further reforms were made. Dr. Aisha Ratib became Minister of Social Affairs and in November the following revisions were suggested and implemented:

1. That the age for legal marriage should be raised to 18 for women and 21 for men
2. That the permission of a judge was required for polygamy
3. That divorces could not take place without a judge being present
4. That the mother should be allowed a greater period of guardianship, but also that guardianship in the case of divorce should go to the parent deemed most suitable to provide it
5. That judges should have more involvement in family law cases, and that female judges should be considered to deal with family law cases.

The government amended the laws relating to personal status in 1979. The amendments, which became known as the "women's rights law," were in the form of a presidential decree and subsequently approved by the People's Assembly. The leading orthodox Islamic clergy endorsed these amendments, but Islamist groups opposed them as state infringements of religious precepts and campaigned for their repeal. The amendments stated that polygamy was legally harmful to a first wife and entitled her to sue for divorce within a year after learning of her husband's second marriage. The amendments also entitled the first wife to compensation.

A husband retained the right to divorce his wife without recourse to the courts, but he was required to file for his divorce before witnesses at a registrar's office and officially and immediately to inform his wife. The divorced wife was entitled to alimony equivalent to one year's maintenance in addition to compensation equivalent to two years' maintenance; a court could increase these amounts under extenuating circumstances such as the dissolution of a long marriage. The divorced wife automatically retained custody of sons under the age of ten and daughters under twelve; courts could extend the mother's custody of minors until their eighteenth birthdays.

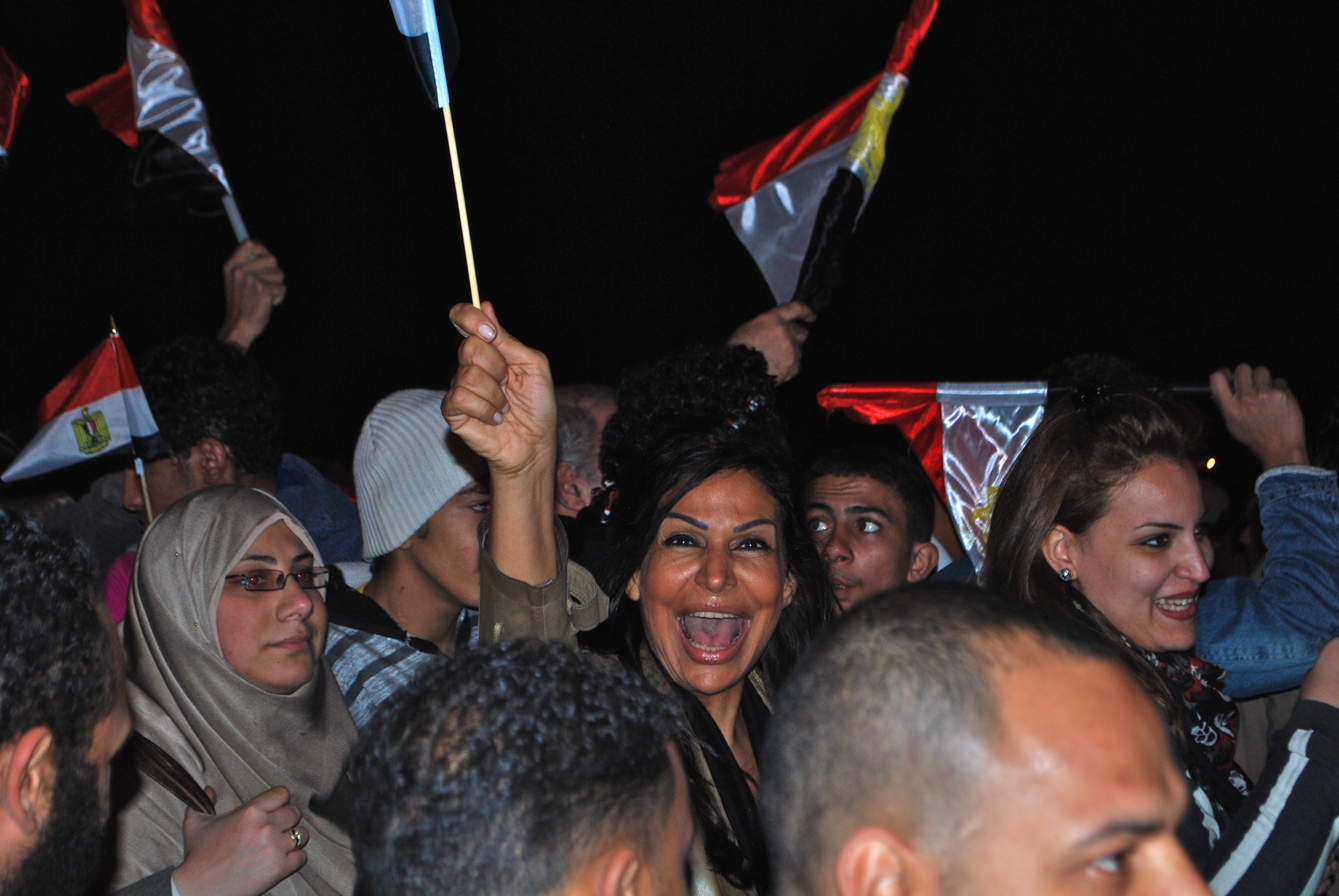
Women during the 2011 Egyptian revolution

In 1985 Egyptian authorities ruled that the amendments of 1979 were unconstitutional because they had been enacted through a presidential decree while the People's Assembly was not in session. A new law reversed many of the rights accorded to women in 1979. A woman lost her automatic right to divorce her husband if he married a second wife. She could still petition a court to consider her case, but a judge would grant a divorce only if it were in the interests of the family. If a divorce were granted, the judge would also determine what was an appropriate residence for the divorced woman and her children.

The changes in divorce legislation in 1979 and 1985 did not significantly alter the divorce rate, which has been relatively high since the early 1950s. About one in five marriages ended in divorce in the 1980s. Remarriage was common, and most divorced men and women expected to wed again. Seven out of ten divorces took place within the first five years of marriage, and one out of three in the first year. The divorce rate depended on residence and level of education. The highest divorce rates were among the urban lower class, the lowest rates among the villagers of Upper Egypt. Throughout the country, as much as 95 percent of all divorces occurred among couples who were illiterate.

Marital rape is not specifically outlawed in Egypt.

== Notable Egyptian women ==
- Rawya Ateya, first female parliamentarian in the Arab world
- Mona Eltahawy, Egyptian American feminist activist
- Ester Fanous, Christian feminist
- Nadeen Ashraf, feminist activist
- Jehan El Sadat, former First Lady of Egypt
- Sameera Moussa, nuclear physicist
- Nawal El Saadawi, feminist writer
- Maya Morsy, head of Egypt's National Council for Women
- Hoda Shaarawi, founder of the Egyptian Feminist Union
- Doria Shafik, early Egyptian feminist leader
- Safeya Zaghloul, former Wafd Party leader

== See also ==
- 678 (film)
- Abduction of Coptic women
- Egyptian Centre for Women's Rights
- Feminism in Egypt
- Gender inequality in Egypt
- HARASSmap
- Judiciary of Egypt
- Operation Anti Sexual Harassment
- Rape in Egypt
- Mass sexual assault in Egypt
- Women's role in the 2011 revolution

General:

- Women in Islam
- Women in the Arab world
- Women in Africa
- Women's rights

== Sources ==
- Beatty, Chester. 1998. egyptology.com (accessed April 12, 2009)
- Brunner, Emma. 1979. Birth of Hatshepsut web.archive.org (accessed April 12, 2009).
- Dunham, D. 1917. Naga-ed-Der Stelae of the First Intermediate Period. fordham.edu (accessed April 12, 2009).
- Piccione, Peter A. 1995. The Status of Women in Ancient Egyptian Society. web.archive.org (accessed April 12, 2009).
- Tappan, Eva March. 1914. The World's Story: A History of the World in Story, Song and Art. fordham.edu (accessed April 12, 2009)
- The Statues of Women in Egyptian Society. library.cornell.edu (accessed April 12, 2009)
- Ward, William. The Egyptian Economy and Non-royal Women: Their Status in Public Life. stoa.org (accessed April 12, 2009)
- Women in Ancient Egypt." Women in Ancient Egypt. N.p., n.d. Web. 07 Sept. 2016. Women in Ancient Egypt
- El-Ashmawy, Nadeen. "Sexual Harassment in Egypt." Hawwa 15, no. 3 (2017): 225–256.
