= Hikmat Abu Zayd =

Egyptian politician and academic

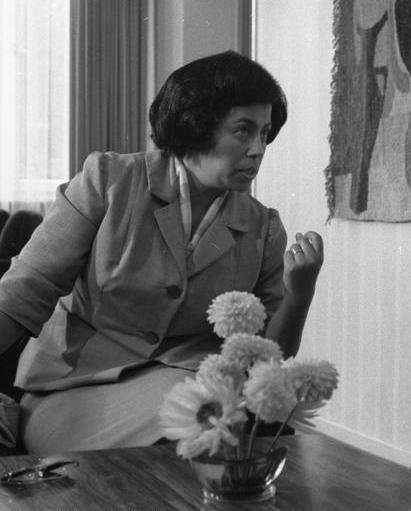
- Abu Zayd in 1962

Minister of Social Affairs of the United Arab Republic
- In office 29 September 1962 – 30 September 1965
- President: Gamal Abdel Nasser
- Prime Minister: Ali Sabri
- Preceded by: Hussein el-Shafei
- Succeeded by: Ahmad al-Sharbasi

Personal details
- Born: 1922 or 1923^{[I]} Shaykh Daud, Asyut Governorate, Egypt
- Died: 30 July 2011 Cairo, Egypt
- Party: Arab Socialist Union
- Spouse: Muhammad Al Sayyad
- Education: Cairo University (B.A., 1940); University of Edinburgh (diploma); University of St Andrews (M.A., 1950); University of London (doctorate, 1957)
- Profession: Professor

Military service
- Allegiance: Egypt
- Battles/wars: Suez War

Hikmat Abu Zayd (Arabic: حكمت أبو زيد; pronounced Hekmat Abu Zeid in Egyptian Arabic; 1922 or 1923 – 30 July 2011)^{[N]} was an Egyptian politician and academic. She became the first female cabinet minister in Egypt in 1962. Her tenure as minister of social affairs set a precedent. Afterwards, it became common for women to head that ministry. An avowed advocate of Nasserism, Abu Zayd has had a major impact on Egyptian law and policy in the areas of social affairs and insurance.

== Early life and education ==
Born in the village of Shaykh Daud, located near the city of al-Qusiyya in Asyut Governorate, Abu Zayd grew up in a nationalist household. Her father's job at the Egyptian State Railways meant that he was assigned to many stations and was constantly on the move. Although her mother was illiterate, Abu Zayd was encouraged to read and was given access to her father's large library. Abu Zayd received an advanced education. After completing her secondary education at the Helwan Girls School, she obtained a licence in history from Cairo University (then named Fuad I University) in 1940. She progressed further in her academic studies by receiving a teaching certificate in 1941, a Master of Arts in education in 1950 from the University of St Andrews, and finally a doctorate in educational psychology from the University of London in 1957. She taught in the Women's College of Ain Shams University from 1955 to 1964, before being promoted to the rank of professor at Cairo University in 1965.

== Tenure as minister ==
In 1962, Abu Zayd sat on the preparatory committee for the National Congress of Popular Forces. During her membership of the committee, she expressed her disagreement with President Gamal Abdel Nasser over some sections in the Charter of National Action. Impressed, Nasser decided to appoint her as a minister. On 29 September 1962, Abu Zayd was named minister of social affairs in Ali Sabri's first government. She retained her role when the cabinet was reshuffled in March 1964, and served until 1965.

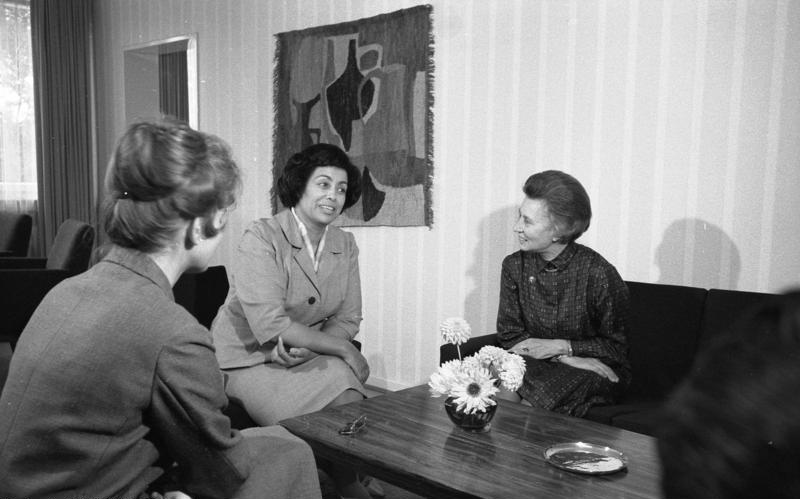
Hekmat Abu Zaid meeting German counterpart Elisabeth Schwarzhaupt in Bonn, September 1963

Abu Zayd was part of a new female leadership that shared the same lower middle class background of Nasser and his fellow Free Officers. Her appointment by Nasser was made in the context of his new socialist program, which put emphasis on broadening access to education and employment for all people, regardless of gender or social class. The 1950s and especially the 1960s were a time of increased female emancipation in Egypt. Polygyny was on the decline, and women were increasingly holding key posts in government, industry and academia. The country's first two female parliamentarians, Rawya Ateya and Amina Shukri, were elected in 1957. Karimah al-Sa'id became the deputy minister of education in the 1960s. Such high-level appointments of a few well-qualified women were showcased by the government, while the majority of Egyptian women remained stuck in the lower echelons of society. Nasser's appointment of Abu Zayd was a politically significant move. Including a woman in the cabinet was a way for him to co-opt female-run charitable organizations into the Arab Socialist Union (ASU), the country's newly formed sole political party. Many of these associations were headed by women from prominent families and were protective of their independence, which Nasser found objectionable. His regime targeted women's organizations in the early 1960s and moved to take over most of their functions as state responsibilities, thereby depriving the associations of their momentum and autonomy. Abu Zayd implemented these policies, which were aimed at benefiting female workers and peasants. The Ministry of Social Affairs which she headed was increasingly specializing in women's issues. In 1963, it organized a general and wide-ranging women's conference to discuss, among other things, ways to increase female economic productivity, working women's leading role in spreading family planning, as well as the rise of family income through the employment of female members. Abu Zayd was named to preside over the conference, thereby cementing her status as leader of the women's movement in Egypt. She became coordinator for women's activities within the Arab Socialist Union in 1963, at a time when the party had nearly 250,000 female members.

During her time in office, Abu Zayd worked on several different social issues. She strongly supported a law that prohibited Islamic oral repudiation and made it mandatory for a husband to go to court to be able to divorce his wife. In order to combat mendicity, she imposed prison terms on recidivist beggars who returned to begging after they had received state-sponsored training in handicrafts. In addition to registering NGOs and expanding their development activities, she launched projects aimed at improving the status of rural women. One of the most sensitive tasks assigned to Abu Zayd was the relocation of thousands of Nubians, displaced by the construction of the Aswan Dam, to newly built villages. Her management of the resettlement process led to her being nicknamed the "Merciful Heart of the Revolution" by Nasser. Nevertheless, the Nubians' forced displacement remains controversial in Egypt to this day, with some blaming Nasser for the neglectful conditions in which the relocated Nubians have been living since then.

On a personal level, Abu Zayd faced domestic problems during her tenure as minister. Her husband was resentful of her responsibility-laden role and of the amount of time she spent outside the house. Their previously modest lifestyle changed considerably as she hired a 12-year-old houseboy and was provided a chauffeur-driven car by the government.

== Exile in Libya ==
Following Nasser's death in 1970 and Anwar Sadat's ascension to the presidency, Abu Zayd's career progression was blocked. She moved to Libya with her husband in 1974. Her Nasserist convictions were in line with the anti-colonialism, anti-Zionism and pan-Arabism of Libya's leader Muammar Gaddafi. Abu Zayd spent nearly two decades in Libya, during which time she taught political science at Al Fateh University in Tripoli. She also penned articles and made speeches denouncing the Egyptian government.

Abu Zayd began criticizing President Sadat in the mid-1970s. She became a leader of the Egyptian National Front, which was set up in Damascus in 1980 by General Saad El Shazly. The organization called for the overthrow of Sadat's government. Due to her opposition to Sadat's peace overture to Israel, Abu Zayd was accused of high treason, terrorism and spying, and was consequently deprived of her Egyptian nationality. This turned her into a stateless political refugee. A long legal battle ensued, which was finally resolved in late 1991 when a judge ruled that Abu Zayd and her husband were entitled to their Egyptian passports. She was also acquitted of the charges of high treason and terrorism.

== Later years and death ==
After having recovered their nationality, Abu Zayd and her husband came back to Egypt in March 1992. She was treated as a VIP upon her return, and rushed to visit Nasser's mausoleum. During the 1990s, she opposed the Gulf War, the Madrid Peace Conference, as well as Zionism and American imperialism. She wrote articles for al-Osboa newspaper in 1998 dealing with the issues of Western imperialism and Arab unity. In late 2010, she was hospitalized at the Anglo-American Hospital in Cairo to receive treatment for her bone fractures. Farkhonda Hassan visited her there on behalf of then First Lady Suzanne Mubarak. During her stay at the hospital, Abu Zayd granted an interview to Almasry Alyoum newspaper in which she defended Nasser's legacy and lamented the loss of tolerance in Egypt.

Abu Zayd died in Cairo on 30 July 2011.

== Awards ==
Abu Zayd received the Lenin Peace Prize in December 1970.

== See also ==
- List of the first female holders of political offices in Africa
- Women in Arab societies
- Women in Egypt

== Notes ==
I^{1} ^{2} : According to Arthur Goldschmidt's Biographical Dictionary of Modern Egypt, Abu Zayd was born in 1922. Sabin M. Shukri's International Who's Who of the Arab World gives 1923 as her year of birth.

== Bibliography ==
- Badran, Margot (1996). Feminists, Islam, and Nation: Gender and the Making of Modern Egypt. Princeton University Press. ISBN 978-0-691-02605-3.
- Goldschmidt, Arthur (2000). Biographical Dictionary of Modern Egypt. American University in Cairo Press. ISBN 978-977-424-579-4.
- Russell, Mona (2004). "Abu Zayd, Hikmat". In Mattar, Philip (ed.). Encyclopedia of the Modern Middle East & North Africa. Vol. 1: Aaronsohn – Cyril VI (2nd ed.). Detroit, MI: Macmillan Reference USA. pp. 39–40. ISBN 978-0-02-865770-7.
- Shukri, Sabin M. (1984). The International Who's Who of the Arab World (2nd ed.). London: International Who's Who of the Arab World. ISBN 978-0-9506122-1-8.
- Sullivan, Earl L. (1986). Women in Egyptian Public Life. Contemporary issues in the Middle East. Syracuse University Press. ISBN 978-0-8156-2354-0.
- Talhami, Ghada Hashem (1996). The Mobilization of Muslim Women in Egypt. Gainesville, FL: University Press of Florida. ISBN 978-0-8130-1429-6.
