= 2011 virginity tests of protestors in Egypt =

During the Egyptian revolution of 2011, several female protestors at Tahrir Square were taken into military custody and subjected to torture and virginity tests.

Protestors were evacuated from Tahrir Square on March 9 and military police took at least 18 women into military custody, where they were beaten, electrocuted, and subjected to searches after being stripped, while male soldiers photographed them, and then subjected them to virginity tests and threatened them with prostitution chargings.

In 2012, the court ruled the acquittal of Ahmed Adel, a recruited doctor in the Egyptian Army who conducted the operation to examine the activists' virginity.

== Background ==
Tahrir Square witnessed clashes between supporters of the continuation of the sit-in in the square and those calling for its evacuation, and soldiers and men in civilian clothes destroyed the protesters camps in the middle of Tahrir Square, where people have been camping sporadically since January 28. Military officers arrested at least 20 women, in addition to at least 174 men, and took them all to the Egyptian Museum, where the army had set up a temporary base since the January protests, and tortured them. Human Rights Watch documented how the army beat, flogged, kicked men, hit women, chained them to an iron fence, and shocked them with electricity. Activists said that they were assaulted and beaten inside the Egyptian Museum, and they said that about 17 girls and more than 500 young men who were arrested were taken into custody, and some women activists were arrested and taken to a military zone called Q28 and virginity tests were conducted for them according to two of them and other witnesses.

== Victims' testimonies ==
- Samira Ibrahim:
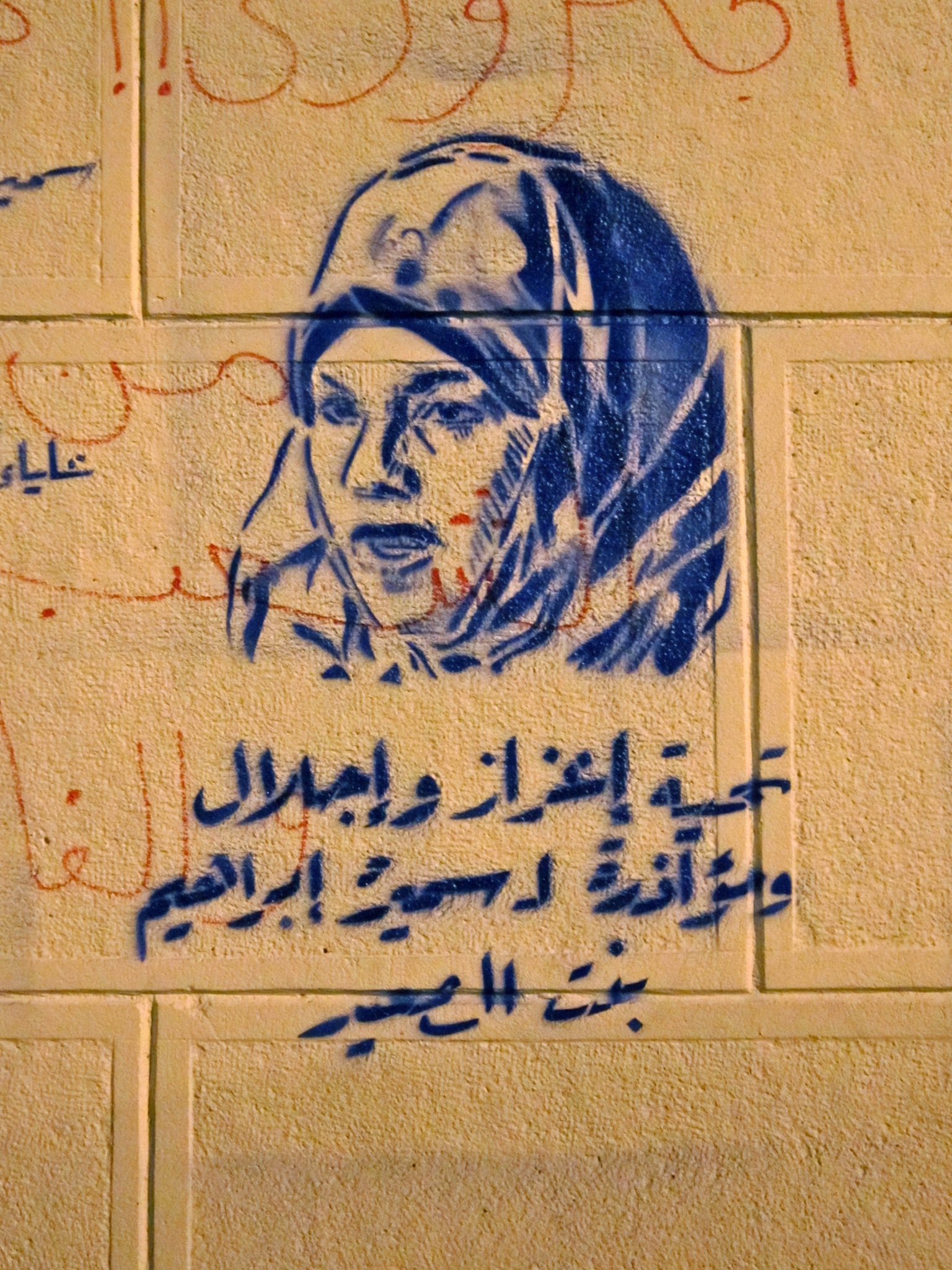
  Samira Ibrahim graffiti in Cairo streets

"They were electrocuting us, throwing water on us, cursing us with disgusting words, and there were people hitting you with boots, and they put us in a bus with a huge of women wearing black robes, they let them out in the museum between us, and the girls were cursing the army officers with very disgusting words, and they brought bottles of Molotov and began to photograph us with them as if we were girls of thuggery and prostitution. we stayed that night in the bus and they kept saying: "You ruined the country, what you do want?", and we had four soldiers who kept beating us all night, and then we reached the military prison. I found a picture of the former President Hosni Mubarak, which was hanged in the military prison, one of the women of the army asked me to take off my clothes, and the room in which the women protesters stood was with opened doors and windows, and when they refused, she brought soldiers in, and one of them beat me. I had to take off and then the soldier at the window, standing, laughing and winking at us, and they were soldiers and officers. I wished to die every day, no matter what you say, I will not be able to tell however i tried to speak, and I wish they had enough and just left us, but they divided us into two groups, each group in a cell. we all have been humiliated, and wished to die. And then she told me to take off so that he would reveal you, and then I took off my pants. And after the test he told me: "Come on, sign here that you are a virgin". Other charges were brought against us, including: attempting to assault army officers while they were working, carrying white weapons, breaking the curfew, and disrupting traffic. A prison sentence was issued against me and suspended."

- Rasha Abdel rahman:

"As soon as I arrived at the military prison, I saw a picture of the deposed President Hosni Mubarak inside the prison, and then a soldier named Ibrahim asked me if I was pregnant. I denied it and told him that I'm a virgin, but he said: "We will see that". We were subjected to tests in a room, in which he told me: "We will find there was a female soldier named Azza, who wore a black veil, and inspected the women by stripping their clothes, so that the girl must be completely naked, despite the presence of male soldiers in the prison, and even though the room's window was open. I felt and still feel insulted by being forced to strip in the midst of the soldiers, who were looking at and examining the features of my body, especially since I was also forced to bend and stretch. It was a terrible feeling, even today I am suffering from what happened. Afterwards, the warden came and spoke to me, at a time when the girls were naked inside the room, and I told him this is not right, because men are not supposed to look at women's nakedness. Rather, it is forbidden for a woman to see a woman's nakedness in Islam, so his response was extremely severe: If you refused to be searched by Madame Azza, I will send a soldier to search you, and I had to let the woman to search me instead of a male soldier. The woman searched us very carefully. She was loosening our hair, and she was wearing pants with a belt. I was surprised that the woman "Azza" was calling for a soldier, and she asked him to enter the room, and she asked him: "Should I remove the belt or not?", as the girls remained completely naked. This situation was very difficult for us. After that, a doctor entered the room and asked us who were virgins and who were married, and we signed and fingerprinted a list containing our names. A soldier named Ibrahim entered, and threatened us, saying: “Who will say that she is a virgin while she is not, I will electrify her and hit her.” And then uttered another term, suggesting that he will rape her. But we were forced into submission, given that we received threats of beatings, electrification, and torture. The room in which the tests were conducted for us was carried out by a doctor, and the female soldier and the officer. I was terrified of what was happening, and I was wondering: Why all this, why are they doing this to us? After the doctor examined me and made sure that I am a virgin, and that the hymen is present, he wrote that in his report, and I signed it."

- Salwa Al-Husseini (20 years old):

"After my arrest, I was taken to a military prison in Heikstep, and I was forced, along with other women, to remove all my clothes for inspection by guards who work in the prison. This took place in a room with two open doors and windows, and while my search was going on, without clothes, the soldiers watched what was happening inside the room and took pictures of the naked women. Then the women were subjected to “virginity checks" in another room by a man in a white coat. He then threatened us that he would accuse "those who would be found not to be virgins" of prostitution.

- Rasha Azab (journalist):

"I was arrested in Tahrir Square, My hands were cuffed. I was beaten and insulted. After our arrest, 18 other women were [initially] taken to the Egyptian Museum, where they were also handcuffed, beaten with sticks, and sprayed with water hoses. They were given electric shocks to their breasts and legs, and they were described as “prostitutes". I was able to see and hear the other detained women being tortured with electric shocks throughout their detention in the museum. I was released after several hours, along with four male journalists as well, but the other seventeen women were transferred to the military prison in Heikstep."

== Timeline ==
- March 9, 2011: The violent dispersal of Tahrir Square, women protesters arrested in Tahrir Square were tortured by army personnel and subjected to "virginity tests."
- June 23, 2011: Human rights lawyers representing Samira Ibrahim filed a complaint for the first time with the Military Prosecution Office
- June 27, 2011: Abdel Fattah el-Sisi – who was the head of Egyptian Military Intelligence at the time – admitted that "virginity tests" had been conducted for arrested demonstrators by military personnel, justifying this by protecting the army from possible accusations of rape. He is the first known Egyptian military official to acknowledge the existence of this practice, which other officers have acknowledged, such as Major General Hussein Othman, Major General Hassan Al-Ruwaini and Major General Hassan Al-Attar, providing the same justification for its practice.
- December 27, 2011: The Administrative Court ruled accepted the lawsuit filed by Samira Ibrahim, and the court obliged Marshal Mohamed Hussein Tantawy, President of the Supreme Council of the Armed Forces and Commander of the Military Region, to pay the case, declaring that revealing virginity is a violation of the sanctity of female bodies and an aggression on their dignity, and demanded that the Military Council not repeat it.
- March 11, 2012: The court ruled the acquittal of Ahmed Adel, a recruited doctor in the Egyptian army who conducted the operation to examine the activists' virginity.

== Reactions ==
- Amnesty International: "Forcing women to undergo “virginity tests" is totally unacceptable. Its purpose is to demean a woman because she is a woman. All medical professionals must refuse to participate in any of these so-called "examinations".
- Human Rights Watch: "The Egyptian army has not investigated or prosecuted anyone for the sexual assault of seven women by members of the army on March 10, 2011 in the military prison in the Heikstep military area, under the pretext of conducting“ virginity tests. "After more than seven months, it was also revealed that the military prosecutor had failed to investigate. Appropriately, in other documented incidents of torture against these women and 13 others, and an estimated 170 men inside the walls of the Egyptian Museum."
- Time magazine announced its list of the most influential people in the world for the year 2012, and the list included Samira Ibrahim, owner of the "virginity test" case.
