= 1957 Egyptian parliamentary election =

- 3 July 1957 (first stage); 14 July 1957 (second stage)
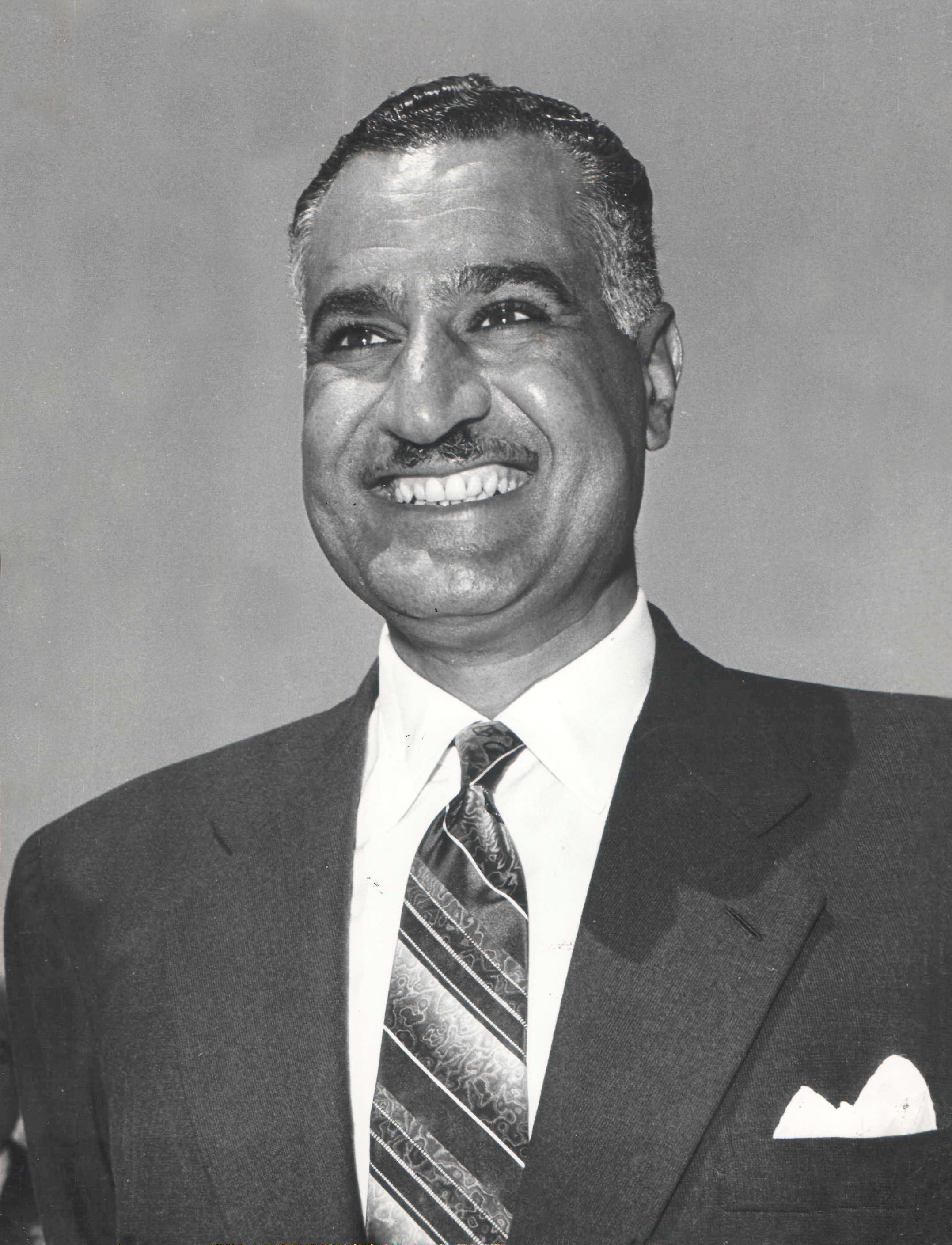
| | First party |
|---|---|
| Leader | Gamal Abdel Nasser |
| Party | NU |
| Seats won | 350 |
Prime Minister before election
Gamal Abdel Nasser
NU
Subsequent Prime Minister
Gamal Abdel Nasser
NU

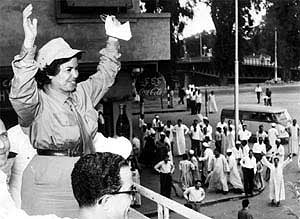
Egyptian officer Rawya Ateya, in military dress, waves to her supporters during her 1957 electoral campaign. She was elected in her Cairo constituency, becoming one of the first two female members of parliament (alongside Amina Shukri) in Egypt and the Arab world.

Parliamentary elections were held in Egypt on 3 July 1957, having originally been scheduled for November 1956, but postponed due to the Suez Crisis. They were the first elections since the 1952 revolution, which saw King Farouk overthrown, the Republic of Egypt established and the approval of a new constitution in a June 1956 referendum. The new system of government banned all existing political parties except the National Union.

A new electoral law was approved on 10 March 1957, which required all candidates to be members of the National Union, literate Egyptian citizens at least 30 years old and without any relationship to the royal family. All candidates had to be approved by the executive committee of the National Union, which consisted of Abdel Latif Boghdadi, Zakaria Mohieddin and Kamal el-Din Hussein. Of the 2,528 candidates registered, 1,318 were approved and 1,210 were rejected for being "undesirable" or "unworthy". (Note: Proctor (1959) gives different figures: of the 2,508 candidates the committee excluded 1,153 of them.)

They were also the first elections in Egypt in which women had the right to vote or stand for election. Despite only six women contesting the election out of a total of over 2,000 candidates, and 70% of Egyptian men being against their presence in parliament, Rawya Ateya and Amina Shukri were elected, becoming the first women parliamentarians in the Arab world.

Following its election, the 350-member National Assembly was seated on 22 July. The Assembly never voted against a government bill, mostly modifying the language of bills proposed by Nasser and his ministers. The Assembly was dissolved on 10 February 1958 following Egypt and Syria merging to form of the United Arab Republic, and the establishment of a joint National Assembly with 400 members from Egypt and 200 from Syria.

== Results ==
| Party | Votes | % | Seats |
|---|---|---|---|
| National Union | | | 350 |
| Total | | | 350 |
| Registered voters/turnout | 5,697,467 | – | |
Source: Nohlen et al.

== Sources ==
- Ries, Matthias (1999). Nohlen, Dieter; Krennerich, Michael; Thibaut, Bernhard (eds.). Elections in Africa: A Data Handbook. Oxford University Press.
- Peretz, Don (1959). "Democracy and the Revolution in Egypt". Middle East Journal. 13 (1): 26–40. JSTOR 4323083.
- Proctor, J. Harris (1959). "The Legislative Activity of the Egyptian National Assembly of 1957–8". Parliamentary Affairs. 8 (1959dec): 213–226. doi:10.1093/parlij/xiii.1959dec.213.
