= Hassan al-Roueini =

Hassan el-Roweiny
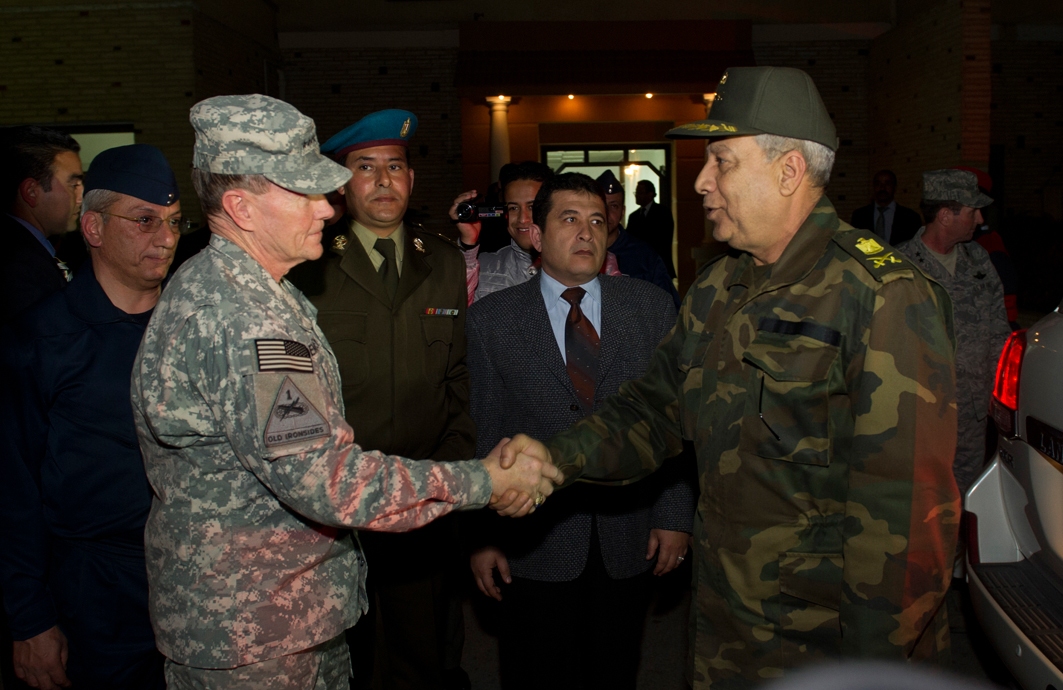
- Hassan al-Roueini (right) and Gen. Martin E. Dempsey (2012)
- Born: June 8, 1950 (age 76)
- Military career
- Allegiance: Egypt
- Branch: Egyptian Army
- Service years: 1971–2012
- Rank: Major General
- Unit: 42nd Mechanized Battalion
- Commands: General Officer Commanding, Central Military Zone (2007-2012)
- Conflicts: Yom Kippur War

Hassan al-Roueini (Arabic: حسن الرويني; born 8 June 1950) was the Egyptian military commander for the Cairo area during the 2011 revolution. He was a member of the Supreme Council of the Armed Forces from 2007 till 2012.

On 10 February General al-Roueini told protestors in Tahrir Square, "All your demands will be met today". On the following day President Hosni Mubarak ceded power to the Supreme Council of the Armed Forces.

On 23 March 2011 Major General al-Roueini welcomed US Defence Secretary Robert Gates to Cairo.

Major General al-Roueini has promised that secret military tribunals - at which between seven and ten thousand Egyptian citizens were tried between February and July 2011 - will be phased out once the state prosecutor's office is properly functioning.
