= Amina Shukri =

Egyptian social worker and politician

Member of the National Assembly
- In office 1957–1964
- Constituency: Alexandria

Personal details
- Born: 1912; Alexandria, Egypt
- Died: 1964; London, United Kingdom

Amina Shukri (Arabic: أمينة شكرى, 1912–1964) was an Egyptian social worker and politician. In 1957 she was one of the first two women elected to the National Assembly.

== Biography ==
Shukri was born in Alexandria in 1912, the daughter of Mohamed Abu El-Ezz, a newspaper editor. She became a social worker and established a children's home that housed around 400 children, and was a member of the Feminist Union. She married Osman Shukri, a doctor and child specialist, with whom she had a daughter.

The 1956 constitution introduced women's suffrage and allowed women to stand as candidates, and Shukri was one of sixteen female candidates in the 1957 parliamentary elections, running in Alexandria. She was elected in the second round of voting, becoming one of the first two female members of the National Assembly alongside Rawya Ateya.

She died during a trip to London for medical treatment in 1964.
