= Samira Ibrahim =

Egyptian activist

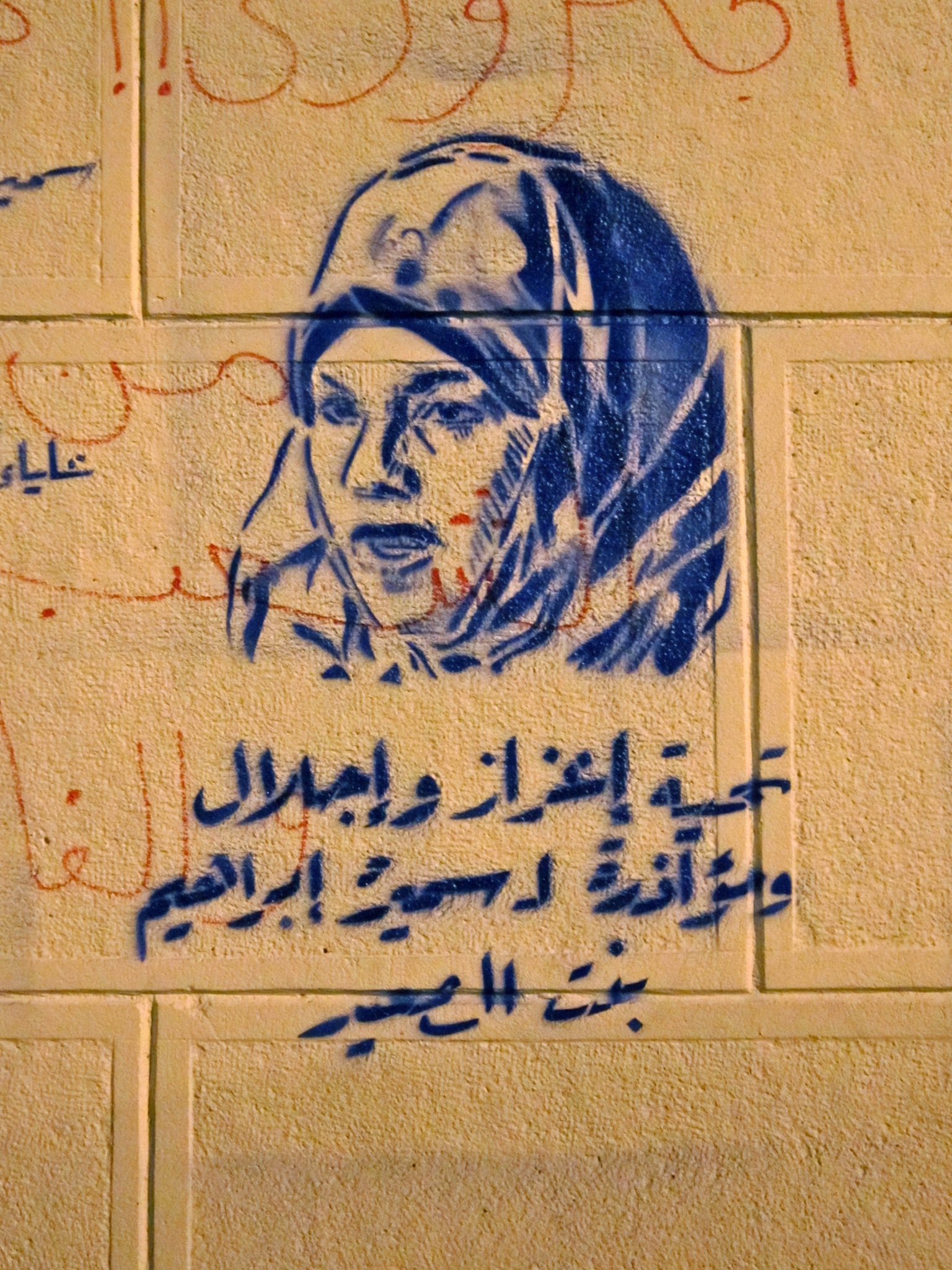
Graffiti reproducing Samira Ibrahim's face.

Samira Ibrahim (Arabic: سميرة إبراهيم, IPA: [sæˈmiːɾæ (ʔe)bɾɑˈhiːm]) (born c. 1987) is an Egyptian activist who came to prominence during the Egyptian revolution.

== Tahrir sit-in and aftermath ==
On March 9, 2011, she participated in a sit-in at Tahrir Square in Cairo. The military violently dispersed protest participants, and Samira and other women were beaten, given electric shocks, strip searched, and videotaped by the soldiers. They were also subjected to virginity tests. The tests were allegedly carried out to protect the soldiers from claims of rape.

After succeeding in placing the case in front of a civilian court, a court order was issued in December 2011 to stop the practice of “virginity tests”. However, in March 2012, a military court exonerated Dr. Adel El Mogy from charges laid in connection with the virginity testing of Ibrahim.

Ibrahim vowed to take her case to the international courts.

== 2013 Twitter allegations ==
In early March 2013, Ibrahim came under criticism after Samuel Tadros, writing in The Weekly Standard, accused her of posting antisemitic and anti-American statements on her Twitter account. These statements included quoting Adolf Hitler, writing: "I have discovered with the passage of days, that no act contrary to morality, no crime against society, takes place, except with the Jews having a hand in it. Hitler." In reaction to a suicide bombing of a bus of Israelis in Bulgaria, she wrote "Today is a very sweet day with a lot of very sweet news." In 2012 on the anniversary of the September 11 terrorist attacks, she tweeted "Today is the anniversary of 9/11. May every year come with America burning".

The U.S. State Department subsequently announced that it would not be giving the International Women of Courage Award to her in light of these comments.

Initially, Ibrahim claimed that her Twitter account had been "previously stolen" and that "any tweet on racism and hatred is not me". However, she later stated "I refuse to apologize to the Zionist lobby in America regarding my previous anti-Zionist statements under pressure from American government therefore they withdrew the award." The U.S. State Department later stated that Ibrahim had since left the United States to return to Egypt.

On March 8, 2013, a spokeswoman for the U.S. State Department stated that "Upon further review, the department has decided not to present her with the award" as American officials "didn't consider some of the public statements that she had made appropriate. They didn't comport with our values" while adding that "There were obviously some problems in our review process, and we're going to do some forensics on how that happened."

== Awards and recognitions ==
- Rank 20, 2012 Time 100

== See also ==
- Human rights in Egypt under the Supreme Council of the Armed Forces
