= Rawya Ateya =

Egyptian politician (1926 – 1997)

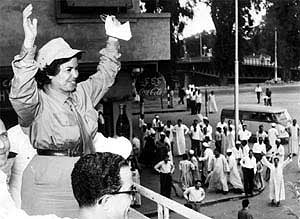
- Rawya Ateya used her military experience as a political asset during her 1957 electoral campaign, hence her appearance in uniform at rallies.

Member of the National Assembly of Egypt
- In office 14 July 1957 – 1959
- President: Gamal Abdel Nasser
- Constituency: Cairo
- Majority: 110,807

Member of the People's Assembly of Egypt
- In office 1984–?
- President: Hosni Mubarak
- Preceded by: Farkhounda Hassan

Personal details
- Born: Rawya Shams el Dine Ateya; 19 April 1926 Giza Governorate, Egypt
- Died: 9 May 1997 (aged 71)
- Party: National Democratic Party
- Education: Cairo University
- Profession: Teacher, Journalist, Politician
- Awards: Badge of the Third Army; Medallion of 6 October; Medal of the armed forces

Military service
- Allegiance: Egypt
- Branch/service: Liberation Army
- Rank: Captain
- Unit: Commandos
- Battles/wars: Suez War

Rawya Ateya^{[I]} (Arabic: راوية عطية; 19 April 1926 – 9 May 1997) was an Egyptian woman who became the first female parliamentarian in the Arab world in 1957.

== Early life ==
Rawya Ateya was born in Giza Governorate on 19 April 1926. She grew up in a politically active family. Her father was the secretary-general of the liberal Wafd Party in Gharbia, and his political activities led to his incarceration. Ateya herself took part in demonstrations from a very early age, and it was injured during the 1939 anti-British protests. She continued her studies to an advanced level, which was highly unusual for Egyptian girls at the time. She obtained several university degrees in various fields: a license in letters from Cairo University in 1947, a diploma in education and psychology, a master's degree in journalism and a diploma in Islamic studies. She worked as a teacher for 15 years and had a brief six-month stint as a journalist.

== Military service ==
In 1956, Ateya became the first woman to be commissioned as an officer in the Liberation Army. She played an active role in the Suez War, during which Egypt was invaded by the United Kingdom, France and Israel. She helped train 4,000 women in first aid and nursing amid the war. Ateya held the rank of captain in a women's commando unit. During the October War of 1973, she chaired the Society of Families of Martyrs and Soldiers, which earned her the nickname of "mother of the martyred combatants." She obtained several military awards from the Egyptian state, notably the badge of the Third Army, the Medallion of 6 October and the medal of the armed forces.

== Parliamentary career ==
Voting rights and eligibility for elected office were extended to Egyptian women by President Gamal Abdel Nasser through the adoption of the 1956 Constitution. The first elections under the new constitution were held the following year, on 3 July 1957. There were only 16 women in a field of more than 2,000 candidates. Opinion polls conducted at the time showed that 70% of Egyptian men were opposed to the idea of women taking seats in Parliament. Nevertheless, Ateya overcame the odds and received 110,807 votes in her constituency. Elected from Cairo in the second round, she described the strong bias she faced at the time by saying: "I was met with resentment for being a woman. Yet I talked to them and reminded them of the prophet's wives and families until they changed their opinions." In addition to such religious arguments, she used her military experience as a political asset. Ateya's victory was all the more significant since her opponent in the election was pro-communist lawyer and banker Ahmed Fuad, a personal friend and protégé of President Nasser.

Ateya took her seat in the National Assembly on 14 July 1957. Although another woman (Amina Shukri) was elected in the 1957 elections, her victory was only announced on 22 July, thus making Ateya the first female parliamentarian in Egypt and the whole Arab world. During her time in Parliament, Ateya championed women's rights. Although supported by most MPs from urban districts such as Cairo and Alexandria, these laws were strongly opposed by MPs representing rural districts and did not pass. After visiting the major communist and socialist-leaning countries of the time such as China, India, the Soviet Union and Czechoslovakia, she told reporters: "I have seen Russia, but I really think that I would like Egypt to be more like the United States of America." She publicly stated that she liked the United States and its president Dwight D. Eisenhower, a position for which she was attacked. Nevertheless, she managed to get away with the criticism due to her strong support for President Nasser, whom she described as "beautiful".

Ateya's victory in 1957 was short-lived: two years later, she lost her bid for re-election. However, she remained active, notably serving on the board of the Red Crescent. Twenty-five years after her electoral loss, Ateya managed to revive her parliamentary career. A social democrat, she was elected to the People's Assembly in 1984 under the banner of the National Democratic Party. She headed the Population and Family Council for Giza in 1993. Ateya died in 1997 at the age of 71.

== Legacy ==
Rawya Ateya is considered a pioneering figure in the history of Egyptian and Arab feminism. In December 2007, a ceremony was held in the Egyptian Parliament to celebrate the 50th anniversary of Ateya's electoral victory. The ceremony was notably attended by Lateefa Al Gaood from Bahrain, who had become a year earlier the first female MP in the Persian Gulf region, as well as Nada Haffadh also from Bahrain and that nation's first ever female cabinet minister.

== See also ==
- List of the first female holders of political offices in Africa

== Notes ==
I: Rawya Ateya is the spelling officially used by Egypt State Information Service, and reflects the way the name is pronounced in Egyptian Arabic. Alternative spellings include Rawya Atiya, Rawya Attiya, Rawya Attia, and Rawiya Atiyya.

== Bibliography ==
- Goldschmidt, Arthur (2000). Biographical Dictionary of Modern Egypt. American University in Cairo Press. ISBN 978-977-424-579-4. OCLC 237384904.
- Karam, Azza M. (1998). Women in Parliament: Beyond Numbers (snippet view). Handbook series. Vol. 2. Stockholm: International IDEA. ISBN 978-91-89098-19-0. OCLC 186101396.
- Sullivan, Earl L. (1986). Women in Egyptian Public Life. Contemporary Issues in the Middle East. Syracuse University Press. ISBN 978-0-8156-2354-0. OCLC 12804980.
