= Niqāb in Egypt =

Face-covering veil in Egyptian society

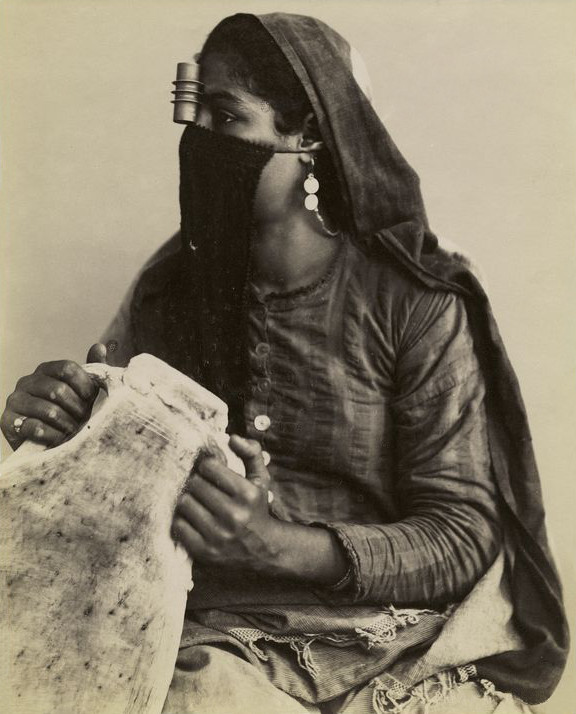
An Egyptian woman in 1860

In a predominantly Muslim society, as many as 90% of women in Egypt have adopted a form of veiling. A majority of Egyptian women cover at least their hair with the hijab, which is a head covering that is worn by Muslim women. Although the phenomenon of wearing the niqāb, a veil which covers the face is not as common, the niqab in Egypt has become more prevalent. While a few women in Egypt wear a black niqab along with a billowing black abaya as seen in countries such as Saudi Arabia, many choose to wear different colors of the niqab or manipulate the hijab to cover their face. Regardless, the growing trend of munaqqabat, or women who wear the niqab, has alarmed the authorities. They have begun to see this dress as a security threat, because it hides the face, and because it is perceived as a political statement, a rejection of the state in favor of a strict Islamic system.

Controversies over the niqāb appear to have emerged in Egypt's recent history. Particularly, a highly emotional response from Egyptian society occurred on October 8, 2009, when Egypt's top Islamic school and the world's leading school of Sunni Islam, Al-Azhar University, banned the wearing of the niqāb in all-female classrooms and dormitories of all its affiliate schools and educational institutes. However, the niqāb has had a long and contentious history in Egyptian society. The meaning of the niqāb worn by upper class Egyptian women at the turn of the century is different from what is worn by women today.

== The niqāb during the early 20th century ==
In the early 20th century, the niqāb was not a practice confined to Muslims, but was worn by both Muslim and Christian elite women. This urban phenomenon originated in Istanbul and was part of the harem tradition, in which concubines and freeborn women of the Egyptian elite were secluded in harems that were guarded by eunuchs. During this time, wearing a face veil was described as "a national Egyptian dress for upper-class women" and it was called al-habara. It consisted of a full-length skirt, a head cover, and al-burqu’, which was the face-cover from below the eyes down to the chest.

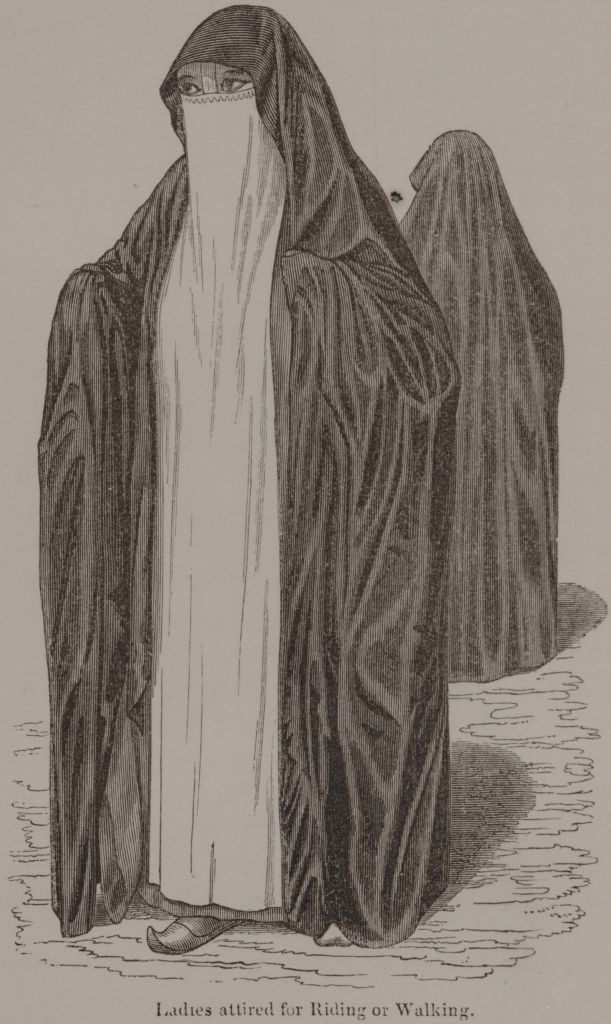
This is a portrait of an upper-class woman in "An Account of the Manners and Customs of the Modern Egyptians" written by British orientalist Edward William Lane in 1833

Although these hareem women are the most visible class of women in chronicles of nineteenth century Egypt, they actually constituted no more than 2 percent of Egypt's five million female population in the late eighteenth century. Although they were numerically insignificant, the elite women's secluded lifestyle was considered the ideal and was envied by lower classes of women.Having to attend to their work in the villages and the city, it was impossible to inhibit their movement with seclusion or cover their faces like the elite women.

=== Discourses on the veil during the nationalist movement ===
The debate about the position of Egyptian women and veil erupted at the turn of the 20th century. In the midst of the Egyptian nationalism movement, the status of Egyptian women was examined by foreigners and Egyptians alike to argue whether Egypt was sufficiently advanced to rule itself without British occupation. Western-educated Egyptians and other leading figures of Egypt's national movement consequently were forced to reexamine the practices of veiling, seclusion of women, arranged marriages, polygamy, and divorce.

==== Male nationalists' stance on the burqu' ====
For elite male nationalists as for the colonisers, the veil and segregation symbolised the backwardness and inferiority of Islamic society. Qasim Amin (1863–1908), a Western-educated Egyptian lawyer and jurist, was one of the founders of the Egyptian nationalist movement and was one of the main figures in the turn-of-the-century debate on women and society. Dubbed as the "Liberator of Egyptian women", he caused intense debate when his book The Liberation of Women (Tahrir Al Mar’a) was published in 1899. This book is widely considered the beginning of the battle of the veil that agitated the Arab press.

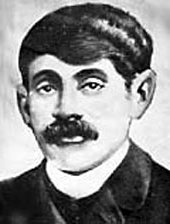
Qasim Amin, the "father of Arab feminism"

In his book, Amin argued for Muslim society to abandon its inherent backwardness and follow the Western path to success. Changing customs regarding women were key to bringing about the desired cultural transformation in Egyptian society. In particular, the veil was considered "a huge barrier between women and their elevation, and consequently a barrier between the nation and its advancement". He describes the women in the harem as having "no role in public life, no role in religious life, no feelings of patriotism, and no feelings". Arguing that "as the socioeconomic status of women rises, their ignorance increases" Amin glorified the peasant woman who led an economically active and unveiled life in comparison to the secluded upper-class woman. For, "although ignorant, the peasant woman has accumulated such a wealth of knowledge through their work and business dealings that if educated would undoubtedly surpass her hareem sister in every respect"

==== Upper-class women's discussion on the burqu' ====
As early as the 1870s and 1880s, before organized feminism in Egypt developed, Egyptian women also were publishing their writings and were engaged in public speaking. Unlike its position in men's "feminist" discourse, the veil was not central to women's organized feminism at that time.

Reacting to the writings of European-influenced Egyptian men who advocated the lifting of the veil for women, Malak Hifni Nasif (1886–1918), an Egyptian Muslim feminist saw a nuanced "male domination being enacted in and through the then contemporary discourse of the veil" and opposed mandatory unveiling. Hoda Shaarawi (1879–1947), a pioneer Egyptian feminist and nationalist, who was married to Ali Shaarawi, a leading political activist, is described in her memoirs as one of the last upper-class Egyptian women to live in the segregated life of the harem. She would be one of the women who would finally bring about the end of this structure. Even though Hoda Shaarawi went to the emerging women's literary salons where Western and Egyptian elite women held debates about practices such as veiling, she opted to remain in a separate segregated room at these receptions and refused to attend mixed parties. At these salons, Western women attacked the niqab when "Egyptian women could camouflage disreputable deeds behind a mask but, because the actions of European women were visible, their behavior was better".

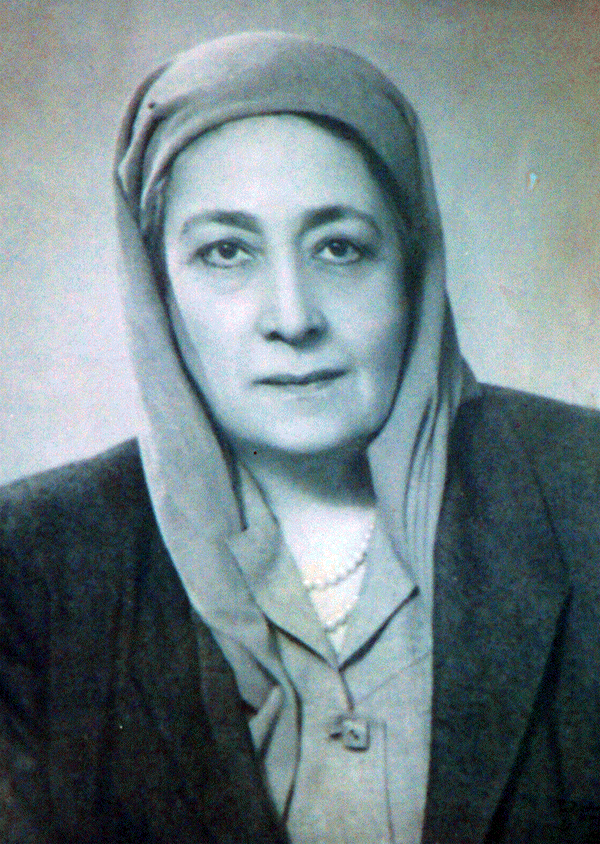
Hoda Shaarawi in a hijab

Thus, when she declared the beginning of an organized feminist struggle called the Egyptian Feminist Union, Shaarawi noted that Egyptian women were calling for restoring their lost rights and reclaiming their national heritage, and not imitating the West. In her speech at the feminist meeting in Rome, Shaarawi specified the face-veil (burqu') and not the hijab as a barrier to women's advancement. She unveiled ceremonially in a public political feminist act in May 1923 upon returning from the International Women Suffrage Alliance Congress in Rome—an act of far-reaching significance.

According to Margot Badran, the editor and translator of Hoda Shaarawi's memoir, Harem Years, this act signaled the end of the harem system in Egypt and the start of the elite women entering the public sphere. This would start a movement among upper-class women to abandon the burqu' and move around the city without the cover. Not only would women like Shaarawi remove themselves from the seclusion of their harem worlds, but fully joined their nationalist husbands in the male-led Egyptian Revolution of 1919 against British occupation.

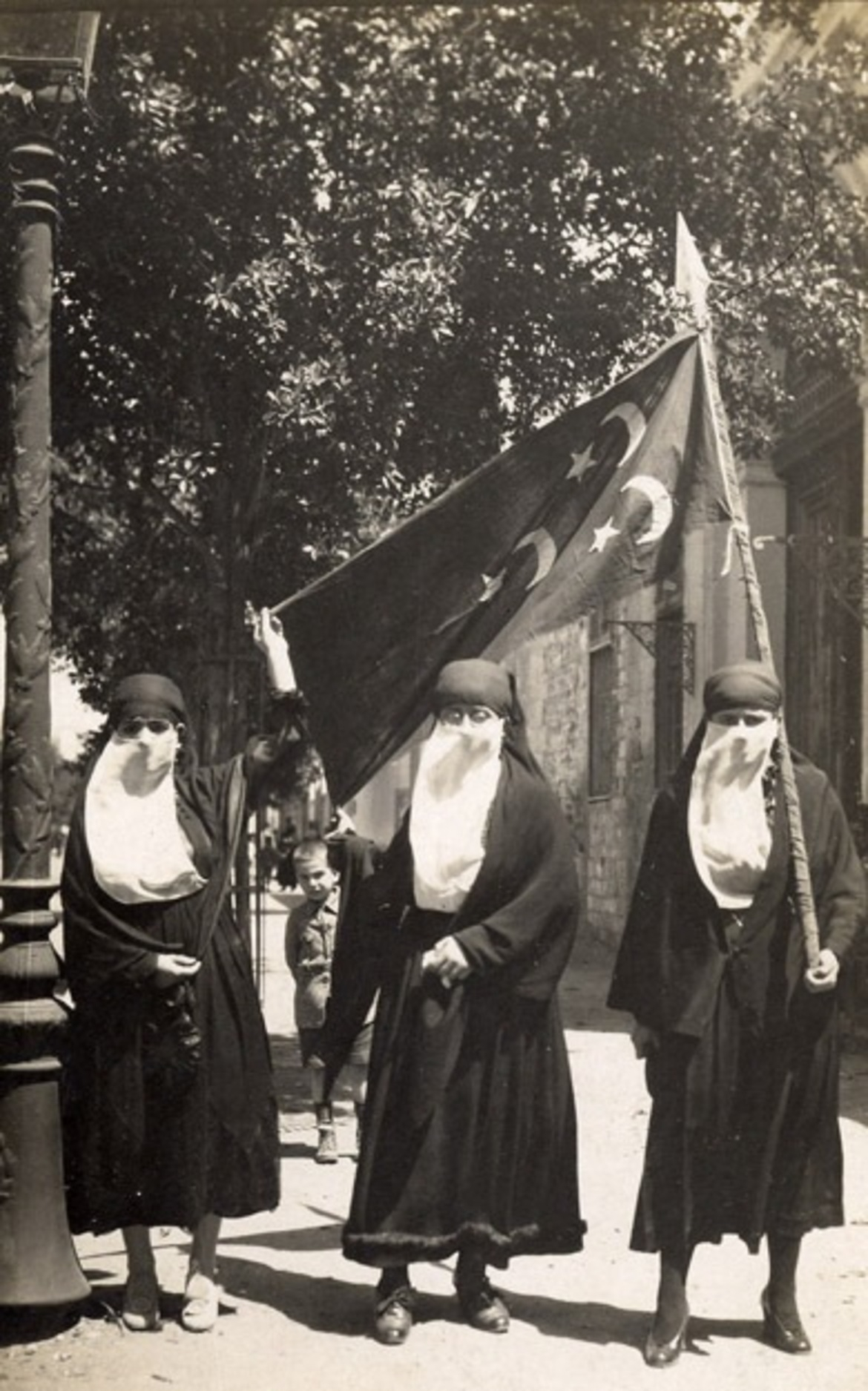
Upper-class women, both Muslim and Coptic Christian, left the harems and joined the Egyptian nationalist movement wearing the niqab (Demonstration, 1919)

In 1925, the EFU founded a French-language magazine L'Egyptienne, which discussed unveiling in the Middle East. Eventually, face covering waned in Egypt, and by the late 1930s it was gone. Instead, middle and upper-class women wore versions of Western dress both on the streets and at home. It was not until the Islamic revival of the 1970s and an introduction of more modest dress that the hijab and less commonly, the niqab, reasserted themselves.

== The niqāb and the rise of the Islamist movement in Egypt ==
The relationship between the Egyptian government, the strengthening Islamist movement of the Muslim Brotherhood, and Al-Azhar—regarded as the foremost institution in the Islamic world for the study of Sunni theology and Sharia—affected the reaction to the conservative symbol of the niqāb. Gamal Abdel Nasser, (1918–1970) was the Second President of Egypt from 1956 until his death. Through Arab nationalism and Arab socialism, Nasser gave secularism a new lease on life when the old regime's version was foundering. After the attempted assassination of Nasser in 1954 by a member of the Muslim Brotherhood Nasser abolished the Brotherhood and imprisoned and punished thousands of its members. The Brotherhood was dissolved and most of its leaders fled to other Arab countries. In 1961, Nasser made traditional religious institutions, such as the division of Religious Endowments and the Islamic University of al-Azhar parts of the state bureaucracy. Since then, the Egyptian government has established a variety of governing bodies to oversee mosque activities, bringing them under the supervision of the Ministry of Religious Affairs. Many attribute the rise of the Islamist movement in Egypt to the many Egyptians who became disenchanted by Gamal Abdel Nasser's secular regime and its failed Arab nationalist movement.

In response to Egypt's catastrophic loss to Israel in the 1967 Six-Day War, and the seeming failure of secularism, there also was a push to return to Egypt's Islamic identity. This Islamist movement especially resonated with the younger generation, university graduates and young professionals, who began to dress differently in public from the majority of urban rising middle and even upper-class Egyptians, who since the 1930s had worn Western clothing.

=== The rise of Islamist movement in universities ===
After Nasser's death in 1970, Anwar Sadat (1918–1981) established his political legitimacy by countering the left. He strategically attempted to make peace with the Islamists, gradually releasing imprisoned members of the Muslim Brotherhood and did not obstruct the Islamist's takeover of university student unions. Especially after the disillusionment brought by the 1973 Yom Kippur War, the Islamists steadily increased their influences and popularity in universities such as Cairo University. For uprooted students from the provinces with dim job prospects, the Islamist groups on campus offered a sense of community, ran study sessions, clubs dedicated to religious activities to counter the recreational and social clubs, and practical help with common problems. They also offered women protection from male harassment in the packed buses and lecture halls by arranging mini-van services and separate seating in class. Those who joined the religious movement were called mitdayyinin (pl. form), which was used to refer to women and men who adopted a new appearance different from the norm of most urban Egyptians and behaved conservatively in public. They reached this state of religiousness by iqtina' (conviction) and were in general not coerced to join. While jellabiyas and long beards were symbols of assertive male Islamists on campus, women's dress was the most obvious and charged symbol of the Islamist movement. In the mid-seventies, the rising Islamist phenomenon was visible in Egyptian streets and universities through women's dress.

=== The Contemporary Veiling Movement ===
A contemporary veiling movement was apparent when women whose upbringing was not religious started wearing various forms of a veil: a hijab, al-khimar, which is a head covering that covers the hair and falls down over the chest and back. Some added the niqāb and the most conservative would wear gloves and opaque socks to cover the hands and feet.

Many scholars attribute the rise of women's Islamic dress to the accessibility of higher education for women from lower middle class who were new to Cairo and felt uncomfortable with Western fashions. However, complaints by wealthy mothers about their daughters who wore Islamic garb depicts that this movement was not limited to the lower middle class. Other reasons for explaining why women began to wear Islamic dress are overlapping and contradictory including: for convenience, to depict one's piety and purity, to affirm indigenous values and reject Western values, to submit to-or rebel against-parental will, to avoid male harassment, and to save money. Unlike the elite women in the beginning of the 20th century who were veiled and prevented from public participation in society, these women continued to be active and visible in mainstream society, competitively enrolled in higher education, and majored in "nonsoft" professional fields. Regardless of their varied motivations for adopting Islamic clothing, what women wore became more of a political statement. By the 1980s, as the religious movement became more of an oppositional political force, the word mitdayyinin was replaced by Islamiyyin, or Islamist. Al-Azhar, which was the Islamic seat of learning and scholarship in Cairo, was not prepared for a movement of such magnitude to emerge. As much as the State wished it, al-Azhar could not condemn this movement.

==== The ban of the Muslim Brotherhood and the niqab on universities ====
Even though Sadat pledged to conform to Sharia and encouraged the People's Assembly to draw up civil, penal, commercial, and procedural law codes based on Sharia, he quickly lost Islamists' trust after signing the peace agreement in 1979. The Islamists were also inflamed by a new law, sponsored by the president's wife, Jihan Sadat, that granted women the right to divorce in 1979.

In what would prove to be his final speech, Sadat ridiculed the Islamic garb worn by pious women, which he called a "tent". In a response to a series of demonstrations orchestrated by the Islamists, Sadat banned Islamist student organisations and prohibited women from wearing the niqab on Egypt's university campuses. There were rumours of veiled women (and even men) taking examinations in others' places, but it was the symbol of the niqab and its political statement that seemed to disturb the regime. After Sadat's assassination by Islamists in 1981, President Mubarak executed Sadat's assassins and kept in force the 1979 restrictions on student activities and imposed a state of emergency in September 1981. After incidents of extremist terrorism in Egypt, the Egyptian state under Hosni Mubarak increasingly instituted reforms to control Islamic practices and ensure that they take a state-endorsed form. (However, the sky-high inflation that resulted in Egypt after President Anwar Sadat opened the door to foreign investment and a more accurate Gulf following of Islam when many Egyptians migrated to oil-rich Arab states in search of employment. Thus, the rise in the niqāb in Egyptian society may depict the conservatism picked up by Egyptian expatriates who move to Saudi Arabia and other Gulf nations.) In 1987, the niqab became the centre of debate at Cairo University. In March 1987, 5000 students demonstrated for three days and pressured the dean of the Faculty of Medicine for barring a face-veiled student from campus. The mufti of Egypt ruled that the campus ban on the niqab did not contravene the Sharia, but in March 1988 the Council of State's Administrative Court overturned the ban. The niqāb, commonly associated as a sign of Salafism and falsely as a sign of Muslim Brotherhood sympathies, still remains the centre of debates on the restriction of Islamic practices in society. While there are no official figures on how many women wear the niqāb in Egypt today, the practice has become increasingly widespread in recent years.

== Controversial incidents around the niqāb ==
Over the past two decades in which the niqāb has begun to be seen in Egypt's streets, the debate about whether the niqāb is appropriate has resulted in high emotional responses from society and a media storm surrounding it. These effects depict how the niqāb debate is not an isolated issue or an isolated struggle between those who wear the niqāb and the government. The debate around the niqab reflects the greater war against the threat of violent extremism which has led to a broad government crackdown and massive arrests, not only of suspected extremists but moderate Islamists. Finding schools and universities as primary sources of Islamic militancy, the government has designated education as an issue of "national security" and has initiated policies around the niqab to counter the threat of fundamentalism.

=== School uniforms debate ===
In 1994, the Minister revised legislation on the Unification of School Uniform, which forbids girls in primary school from covering their hair, but allows girls 12 and older who had parental permission to cover their heads. The order also prohibited the niqāb at all levels. Education Minister Alaa Baha Eddin asserted that the educational system was slipping out of the hands of the governments and falling into the hands of extremists.

The minister's ban on the niqāb has been interpreted by many Islamists as an indication of his hostility to Islamic fundamentalism. Baha Eddin has been outspoken in his opposition to Islamism, at conferences and in statements published by the media. After the Education Minister encountered criticism from differing ideological camps for interfering in the practices of individuals and schools, he rallied the support of strategic religious figures, including al-Azhar. The Grand Mufti and Shaykh of al-Azhar, Muhammad Sayyid Tantawy, issued a fatwa stating that the niqāb is not a requirement in Islam.

Despite the Azhar's support, the uniform legislation triggered enormous debate and resulted in a spate of lawsuits. Parents argued that wearing the hijab or niqāb is a religious freedom for the children to wear what they want to wear. The court rejected a lawsuit filed against the minister by the father of a schoolgirl who was suspended for refusing to remove the niqāb. Dozens of schoolgirls were suspended since the ban was issued, but in most cases the courts have overruled the schools' decision. The well-known Islamist lawyer, Montasser el-Zayat, tried and won over twenty-five niqāb-related cases in the lower courts.

Finally in a 1996 appeal that reached the Supreme Constitutional Court—Egypt's highest court—Ministerial Order 113 of 1994 was ruled unconstitutional. However, the debate on the appropriateness of the niqāb continued to universities.

=== American University in Cairo ===
In 2000, a controversy around the niqāb erupted in the private American University in Cairo (AUC) when a student wished to be fully face-veiled—at the time unprecedented at the institution. In 2001, AUC formally declared a ban on the niqāb. It supported its stance by quoting a 1994 regulation laid down by the Ministry of Education deeming the niqāb inappropriate in academic institutions. AUC was a private institution and it prided itself on a liberal arts education, which the niqāb does not represent. Another reason provided by the Minister was on the basis of security reasons since the identity of the student is hidden. Later in the same year, Heba el-Zeini an English graduate student from Al-Azhar University was denied entrance to the AUC library with her niqāb on due to the problem of identification that the niqāb can pose. Her lawyer, El-Zayyat argued against this when he suggested that a female officer could inspect the woman's identity. The lower court ruled in favour of el-Zeini and obliged the university to allow students wearing a face veil on campus. The university refused to execute the decision and appealed the verdict. The case was transferred to the Circuit of Unification of Principles, an 11-judge committee of the Supreme Court, for a decision. In 2007, the court ruled that the American University in Cairo was wrong to bar a woman who wears the niqāb from using its facilities. The court cited personal and religious freedom as grounds for its ruling.

=== Al-Azhar controversy ===
On October 3, 2009, on a tour of an Al-Azhar girls’ school, Al-Azhar's Sheikh Muhammad Sayyid Tantawy, also referred to as Tantawi, ordered an 11-year-old pupil to remove the niqāb, saying that "the niqāb is only a custom and has no connection to Islam". Four days later, Al-Azhar Supreme Council, which Tantawi headed, passed a resolution banning the wearing of the niqāb in all-girl Al-Azhar classrooms and dorms. This ban applied to all levels: elementary schools, high schools, and colleges.

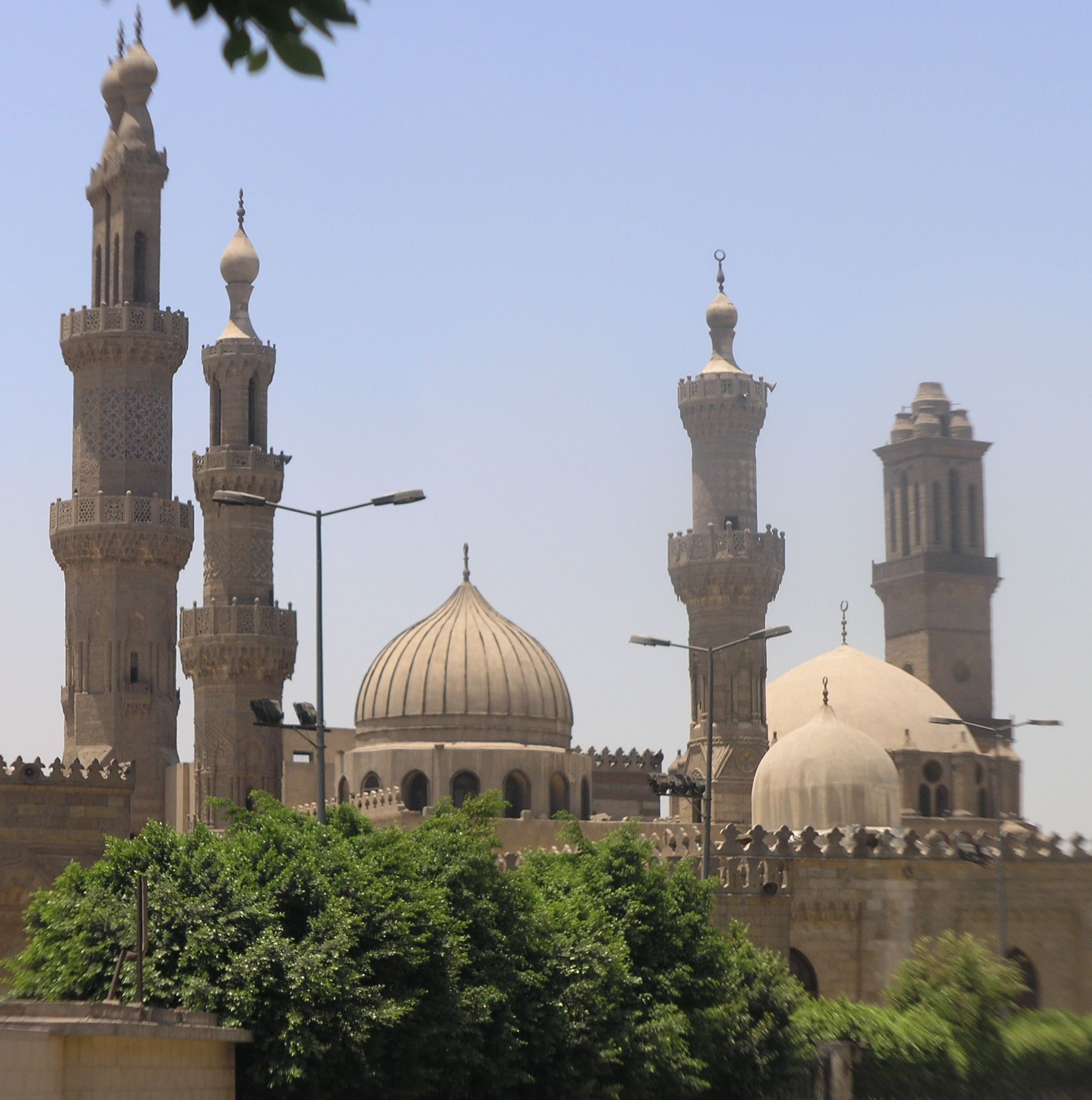
In October 2009, a controversy surrounding the niqab occurred in the Al Azhar Mosque and University

Sheikh Tantawi clarified that a woman wears the niqāb so that no man may see her face—and that it was completely illogical for her to wear it where only women were present. He stressed that for this decision, he had relied on a majority clerical opinion that a woman's face is not shameful. The council asserted that it was not against the practice, but did not consider the niqāb an Islamic obligation.

The Minister for Higher Education, Hani Hilal announced later that the niqāb would also not be allowed in women's dormitories in public universities for security reasons. The decision, the minister said, followed fifteen incidents in which men had been caught attempting to enter dormitories disguised as women. Hilal said that female students were allowed to wear the niqāb on campus. However, the students had to take off the niqāb upon entering the dorms, so as to protect the girls from men that might enter the area disguised as women. In December 2009, the President of Ain Sham University expelled students wearing the niqāb from the university's hostel. The Court of Administrative Justice issued upheld the right of students wearing the face veil to reside in the girls' dormitories of public universities and suspended the decision, stating that the expulsion was a breach of personal liberty and violated the right to education, including the right to equal access to university services and buildings.

==== Public reaction ====
The Al-Azhar decision prompted heated discussions in the media, with debates on religion, personal freedom, the role of religious institutions in society, and the identity of Egyptian society. Even though this was not the first decision concerning the wearing of the niqāb, the fact that the order came from Egypt's highest seat of Islamic teaching provoked outcries from both conservatives and civil liberty campaigners.

To prevent further public outrage, the Minister of Religious Endowments Mahmoud Hamdi Zaqzouq directed that preachers at ministry mosques would not be allowed to mention the niqāb in their sermons. Rights activists from the Egyptian Initiative for Personal Rights called the ban an infringement on personal liberties when "according to the constitution, no one has the right to force women not to wear them." Students who wore the niqāb were outraged when they offered to remove their niqābs at the entrance for security but were forbidden from staying in the dormitories wearing the niqāb. The Muslim Brotherhood also questioned the government's legal authority over Al-Azhar. Their leader argued that Tantawi was not entitled to make any decisions to limit the freedom of women to wear what they see as an expression of modesty, especially in the grounds of a religious institution. He argued that since there is no text that forbids a woman from wearing the niqāb, the Sheikh of Al-Azhar violates the Shari'a. The Muslim Brotherhood in parliament claimed that the decision to ban the veil would violate Article II of the Constitution. This Article stipulates that "Islam is the official state religion and Arabic the official language, and Islamic Shari'a is the main source of legislation". The ban also violates Article XVIII of the Constitution relating to the right to education. In addition, it violates Article 40 of the Constitution, which states that "citizens are equal before the law, they are equal in rights and duties without discrimination because of sex, origin, language, religion or creed".

The Qatar based Islamic Scholar, Yusuf al Qaradawi while saying that the niqab is not a religious obligation respects those who believe it is and says that the state has no right to restrict women from adopting this type of dress. He states:

No Muslim ruler or official has the right to ban the niqab. If there is no ban on those who are indecently dressed, how come we prevent a woman from donning the niqab?

He does however make an exception for purposes of security,

There is an exception, however, in certain circumstances when it is needed to identify the girl or woman, such as taking a photo of her for an ID card or passport, or when there is an exam and it is feared that a girl may secretly replace another. In such cases, she has to show her face for identification.

Opponents to the niqāb ban believed that banning the niqāb for reasons of security was disingenuous. The government, in their opinion, through the education ministry's and Al-Azhar's ban, were targeting the wearing of the niqāb itself.

==== Banning the niqāb during exams ====
Despite that the niqāb ban was limited to all-female settings, the al-Azhar niqāb ban still created public controversy. However, in January 2010, the ban extended to mixed settings. The Administrative Judiciary Court allowed universities to ban female students who wear the niqāb from taking mid-year exams. The courts said that it did not aim to limit the women's freedoms but claimed that the niqāb allowed students to disguise themselves as other candidates, so banning it in exams ensured equal opportunity to all students. The Presidents of Ain Shams, Cairo, and Helwan Universities have barred over 200 students wearing the niqāb from taking the exams. Because the ban was limited to times and places of examinations, the Court reportedly found that the ban did not contradict the ruling in 2007.

In protest to the ban, over twenty students wore protective facial masks asserting that they were wearing the masks simply to protect them from the H1N1 virus. Protests of women who wore the niqāb and were prohibited from taking their examinations took place in front of the universities. These female students filed lawsuits demanding that they be allowed to take their exams after checking their identity. Some girls proposed that the females wearing niqāb could all go in one room, unveil, and be monitored by women. Even though the ban was enforced during the first academic semester, another decision was made allowing them to enter the examination halls at the end of the academic year after checking their identity cards. In addition, fourteen women of the teaching staff in Cairo and Ayn Shams universities filed a lawsuit complaining that they were denied their right to put on the niqāb while exercising their duties of supervising university exams and teaching with their niqāb on. These women pointed to the court decision earlier made allowing Iman al-Zayni to wear her niqāb at AUC. And in May 2010, the Administrative Judicial Court issued a decision suspending the enforcement of the decision banning women members of the university teaching staff, who put on the niqāb, from appearing in the examination halls. However, the battle still continued when Ayn Shams University decided to ban niqāb-wearing faculty members from teaching at the university and entering lectures, from the 2010-2011 academic year, when educational activities require communication between the students and faculty .

==== Global outcomes by Al-Azhar controversy ====
The recent debates about the niqāb in Egypt have initiated and added on to other Arab and European governments discussing the ban of the niqāb. Encouraged by the firm stance Al-Azhar institution took against the niqāb, European governments felt more comfortable to openly criticize the niqāb. For example, only one day after news of Tantawi's possible ban hit the media, Italy's Prime Minister Silvio Berlusconi and his right-wing coalition, the anti-immigration Northern League party, or the Lega Nord presented a proposal to ban the niqāb. Italian politicians leading the charge quoted Tantawi in support of their goal. On November 26, 2009, Italy was the first European country to pass a law banning the wearing of the niqāb in streets or public places. Police are authorised to demand that the women remove it, and that they pay a fine for breaking the law.

On September 14, 2010, the French parliament passed a law to prohibit wearing the niqāb in public. The ban would come into force at the beginning of next year if it was not overturned. Abdel Muti al-Bayyumi, a leading cleric at Al-Azhar applauded France's ban on the niqāb. He publicly gave his support to the French and stated that his position against the niqāb was actually older than France's. In addition, he said he wanted to send a message to Muslims in France and Europe in that the niqāb has no basis in Islam, and that those who wear the niqāb in France are not giving a good impression of Islam.

== Cairo University ban on face veil ==
In 2016 and 2017 the Government of Egypt and parliament made moves to ban the burqa with leading politicians arguing the full-face veil is neither an Islamic tradition, nor required in the Koran.

On 27 January 2020, Egypt's High Administrative Court approved on Monday Cairo University's decision to ban its professors from wearing the niqab or face veil which was introduced in 2015.

== Calls for a broader burka ban ==
In November 2021, MP Farida al-Shoubashy announced that she plans to submit a draft law for discussion in the parliament, prohibiting and criminalizing the wearing of the niqab in Egypt.

In 2018, MP Ghada Agamy introduced a bill in the House of Representatives proposing a ban on wearing the niqab in public places. However, the bill did not advance.

== Banning the niqāb in schools ==
In September 2023, the niqab was banned in public and private schools.

== See also ==
- Anti-mask laws
- Hijab and burka controversies in Europe
- French ban on face covering
- Types of hijab
