= Arab feminism =

Idealogical movement

Arab feminism is a diverse current within the feminist movement that emerged, developed, and is practiced in the Arab world. Rooted in the late 19th-century Nahda (Arab Renaissance), early Arab feminism was closely linked to the struggle for national liberation from European colonialism and the push for social and legal reforms. It later evolved to include state feminism, secular feminism, and Islamic feminism.

The movement encompasses a range of ideologies, strategies, and priorities across different Arab countries and historical periods.

== History ==
=== Nahda (19th century) ===
The Nahda was an Arabic political and cultural movement that dominated the period from 1850 to 1914, promoted by both Muslim and Christian Arabs.

The Arab feminist movement began in the 19th century as part of a general awakening (Nahda) and went through stages that reflected the Western movement. It emerged in Egypt, Lebanon, and Syria, accompanied by feminist writing and activism.

Egyptian thinker Qasim Amin wrote The Liberation of Women in 1899 and became the "father of Arab feminism" because of his claim that women needed education and liberation for Egypt to liberate itself from Britain. His book sparked a feminist debate that lasted until the 1952 coup in Egypt. However, his "feminism" became the subject of scholarly controversy, as he joined the discourse on women's rights relatively late in its development.

Lebanese-Egyptian writer Zaynab Fawwaz (ca. 1850–1914) was an early feminist voice who addressed girls' education, women's economic dependency, and gender-prejudiced uses of religious knowledge, framing her arguments within the terms of Islamic shari'ah law.

=== Pan-Arab feminism and the Arab Feminist Union ===
The Arab Feminist Union (AFU) was established in 1945, bringing together women's organizations to promote feminism and pan-Arab unity. Among the issues addressed by the AFU were the rights accorded to women under Islam, the use of Arab women as prostitutes by Western militaries, and the gendered nature of the Arabic language.

=== Islamic feminism ===
Islamic feminism is a form of feminism concerned with the role of women in Islam, aiming for the full equality of all Muslims regardless of gender. Islamic feminists interpret the Quran and Hadith in an egalitarian manner and advocate for women's rights and equality. Some scholars argue that Islamic and Arab feminisms challenge hegemonic Western feminist narratives by offering culturally embedded alternatives rooted in Arabic experience and theology. Moroccan sociologist Fatima Mernissi was a prominent Islamic feminist who combined Islam and feminism, grounding her arguments in Islamic teachings.

== Major figures ==
- Qasim Amin (1863–1908): Egyptian jurist and philosopher
- Huda Sha‘rawi (1879–1947): Egyptian feminist, founder of the Egyptian Feminist Union and the Arab Feminist Union
- Nawal al-Saadawi (1931–2021): Egyptian writer and physician, founder of the Arab Women's Solidarity Association, vocal opponent of female genital mutilation
- Fatima Mernissi (1940–2015): Moroccan feminist sociologist known for her critique of patriarchal interpretations of Islam
- Aisha Taymur (1840–1902): Egyptian traditionalist poet who advocated for women's liberation from a traditionalist perspective
- Zaynab Fawwaz (ca. 1850–1914): Lebanese-Egyptian writer who articulated early feminist arguments within an Islamic framework
- May Ziadeh (1886–1941): Lebanese-Palestinian modernist writer who advocated for women's liberation from a modernist perspective

== See also ==
- Islamic feminism
- Women in the Arab world
- Arab Feminist Union
- State feminism
