= List of Egyptian women writers =

This is a list of women writers who were born in Egypt or whose writings are closely associated with that country.

== A ==
- Aisha Abd al-Rahman (1913–1998), novelist, biographer, critic, educator
- Radwa Ashour (1946–2014), novelist
- Lina Attalah (active since 2004), journalist, newspaper editor
- Celine Axelos (1902–1992), poet, columnist

== B ==
- Hala El Badry (born 1954), journalist, novelist
- Salwa Bakr (born 1949), critic, novelist, translator
- Rehab Bassam (born 1977), published blogger

== E ==
- Soheir El-Calamawy (1911–1997), short story writer, literary critic, novelist
- Mansoura Ez-Eldin (born 1976), novelist, journalist

== F ==
- Ikhlas Fakhri (born 1940), poet and academic
- Safaa Fathy (born 1958), poet, filmmaker, playwright, essayist

== H ==
- Amira Hanafi (born 1979), American/Egyptian poet and artist active in electronic literature

== K ==
- Jacqueline Kahanoff (1917–1979), novelist, essayist, journalist
- Karima Kamal (born 1949), journalist and nonfiction author

== M ==
- Mother Irini (1936–2006), abbess, religious writer

== N ==
- Saiza Nabarawi (1897–1985), journalist, newspaper editor, feminist
- Iris Nazmy (died 2018), writer, journalist, film critic
- Amira Nowaira (active since the 1990s), educator, translator, non-fiction writer

== R ==
- Somaya Ramadan (1951–2024), short story writer, novelist, translator, educator
- Alifa Rifaat (1930–1996), short story writer, novelist
- Nawal El Saadawi (1931–2021), feminist writer, novelist, playwright, psychiatrist

== T ==
- Miral al-Tahawy (active since 1995), novelist, short story writer
- Galila Tamarhan (died 1863), early female contributor to medical journals
- Aisha Taymur (1840–1902), poet, novelist, feminist
- May Telmissany (born 1965), Egyptian-Canadian novelist, translator, film critic, educator
- Munira Thabit (1902–1967), journalist, non-fiction writer, memoirist

== Y ==
- Rose al Yusuf (1898–1958), actress, journalist

== Z ==
- Amina Zaydan (born 1966), novelist, short story writer
- Latifa al-Zayyat (1923-1996), activist, writer
