= Munira Thabit =

Egyptian journalist and writer

- Born: Arabic: منيرة ثابت; 1902; Alexandria, Egypt
- Died: September 1967 (aged 64–65); Cairo, Egypt
- Other names: Bint Al-Waha
- Occupations: journalist, writer
- Years active: 1924–1960
- Known for: challenging the political order
- Notable work: Thawra fi-l-birj al `aji: mudhakkirati fi `ishrin `aman `an ma`rakat huquq al-mar'a al-siyasiya (A Revolution in the Ivory Tower: My Memories of Twenty Years of Struggle for Women's Political Rights, memoir

Munira Thabit (or Mounira Thabet) (Arabic: منيرة ثابت) (1902–1967) was an Egyptian journalist and writer, known as one of the first journalists to demand equality for men and women. She was the first woman to enroll in the French Law School of Cairo and the first to earn a license en droit (the French undergraduate law degree) enabling her to practice law before the Egyptian Mixed Court. Despite her distinction as the first woman lawyer in Egypt, the barriers to practicing law as a woman, led her to pursue a writing career.

== Early life ==
Munira Thabit was born in 1902, or possibly 1906 in Alexandria to an educated Turco-Egyptian mother and a father who was an employee of the Interior Ministry. Details of her life are scarce as she purposely did not include personal anecdotes in her memoirs to redirect the focus to public and political issues. She attended the Italian school in Cairo, learning the rudiments of English and Italian, and then attended the government primary school. After receiving her high school diploma in 1924, she wrote an open letter to the parliament decrying the 1923 constitution which did not allow women to participate in the electoral processes and run as candidates. In 1925, Thabit enrolled as the first woman in the French Law School of Cairo and subsequently earned her license en droit in Paris, in 1933, becoming the first woman lawyer of Egypt. She was allowed only to argue cases before the Egyptian Mixed Court, and faced with the barriers to women's participation, she turned to journalism.

== Career ==
Between 1923 and 1933, Thabit struggled to participate in the Egyptian Feminist Union (EFU) (Arabic: الاتحاد النسائي المصري). Because she was of a middle and working-class background, the elite women who ran the EFU denied her and her ideas entry into their organization. She believed that women deserved equality in all areas of society, including education, marriage and work, as well as their choice to wear or not wear the veil. Thabit founded the French language magazine, l’Espoir in 1925 and a year later with the help of journalist Abd al-Qadir Hamza founded al-Amal, the first Wafdist women’s periodical. She and Hamza married, but the marriage quickly fell apart and the two journals had sporadic printing during her schooling. She then began writing articles for Al-Ahram at the invitation of Antun Jumayyil, which she continued until his death in 1948. During her university studies in France, Thabit attended an international journalism conference in 1928 in Cologne, Germany, as a representative for Egypt, since she was considered to be Egypt's top woman journalist at that time.

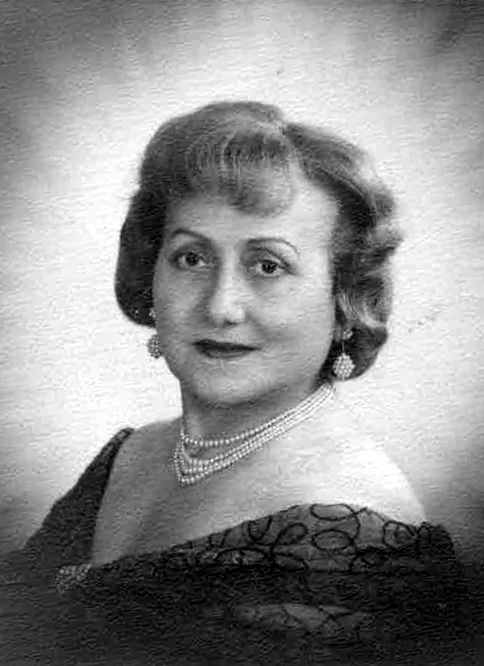
Munira Thabit

When Thabit completed her law degree in 1933, the EFU finally invited her and other recent graduates to a party to honor their achievements and for the first time, she was allowed to insert some of the issues that were important to her into their women's rights agenda. She had to acknowledge the elite's construct of women's role in society to have any influence in their programs or policies. She wrote an article on the Anglo-Egyptian treaty of 1936 criticizing the agreement. In 1938, she participated in the Eastern Women's Congress held in Cairo pressing for Arab nationalism. In 1939, at the invitation of Huda Sha'arawi, who was president of the EFU, Thabit and Ceza Nabarawi attended the International Alliance of Women Conference held in Copenhagen. Thabit was cautioned that she must not include any revolutionary agenda or press for political rights, but instead must support pacifism and accept the order colonialism provided. Out of these conferences, came Thabit's inspiration for her 1939 "red book" (a reference to something endangered) publication of قضية فلسطين (The Cause of Palestine), as a response to Britain's white paper and to directly challenge Western imperialism.

Thabit was not a pacifist, instead, she scoffed at the creation of the United Nations. She instead wanted women in Egypt to draw on their heritage and remember that in the past, before Westernization, women had ruled in the country. In 1946, she wrote a series of articles denouncing the Bevin-Sidqi negotiations, in which Ernest Bevin the British foreign secretary and Egyptian Prime Minister Isma'il Sidqi Pasha later agreed that the British would evacuate Alexandria and Cairo but would be invited back into the country if border aggression occurred. That same year, she published her memoirs, البرج العاجي : مذكراتي في عشرين عاما عن حقوق المرأة السياسية (A Revolution in the Ivory Tower: My Memories of Twenty Years of Struggle for Women's Political Rights, memoir), which focused exclusively on public and political commentary during her lifetime, to retaliate against claims that women were incapable of serious analysis and focused on silly stories.

In her later career, Thabit was instrumental in helping to found the Union of Egyptian Journalists. In the 1950s, she pressed the Ministry of Education to remove the restriction that upon marriage women had to resign from teaching posts. She served as a civil defense volunteer during the Suez Crisis of 1956 and the following year made an unsuccessful bid for the Parliament of Egypt. In 1960, she finally closed al-Amal, when President Nasser decreed that all press organizations had to surrender their companies to the National Union and become nationalized under government control. By this time, Thabit was losing her sight and traveled abroad in 1964 for a successful operation to restore her vision. She died in Cairo in September 1967.

== Selected works ==
- Qadiyat Filistin: ra'i al-mar'a al-Misriya fi-l-kitab al-abyad al-injlizi (Arabic: قضية فلسطين : رأي المرأة المصرية في الكتاب الأبيض الإنجليزي) [The Cause of Palestine: Egyptian Woman’s Opinion on Britain’s White Paper] (in Arabic). Cairo, Egypt: رابطة التضامن الأدبي. 1939. OCLC 4770419694.
- Thawra fi-l-birj al 'aji: mudhakkirati fi 'ishrin 'aman 'an ma'rakat huquq al-mar'a al-siyasiya (Arabic: ثورة في البرج العاجي : مذكراتي في عشرين عاما عن حقوق المرأة السياسية) [A Revolution in the Ivory Tower: My Memories of Twenty Years of Struggle for Women's Political Rights, memoir] (in Arabic). Cairo, Egypt: دار المعارف. 1946. OCLC 4770048838.
