= Sophie Abdullah =

Egyptian writer (1925–2003)

Sufi Abdallah (1925 – 2003) was an Egyptian playwright, novelist, short story writer, journalist, editor, and translator.

Sufi Abdallah was born in 1925 in Faiyum. She attended British, French, and Italian schools and studied Arabic at home and was a student of Egyptian literary critic and journalist Abbas Mahmoud al-Aqqad, who referred to her as "Al-Sayyid Sufi". She worked as a teacher and began writing short stories in 1942.

She participated in a short-story competition run by Dar al-Hilal and although her stories were submitted late, the editor of Al-Musawar magazine was impressed and published them in future issues. From 1948 to 1975, she worked for the Dar al-Hilal publishing house as an editor. She contributed numerous short stories to their publications, as well as the weekly column "Your Problem" in the women's magazine Hawaa and summaries of foreign plays and novels for Al-Hilal. She published five novels, a dozen short story collections, translations, and two collections of biographies of women.

Her drama Kisibna al-brimo (1951) was the first play by an Egyptian woman staged at the Cairo Opera House by the Modern Theatre Company.

Translations of her work into English include her stories "Eight Eyes" (translated by Miriam Cooke) and "Half a Woman" (translated by Dalya Cohen-Mor).

== Bibliography ==
- Nisa Muharibat (Fighting Women, biographies), 1951.
- al-Masakin (translation of Dostoevsky's Poor Folk and Other Stories), 1952.
- Nifirtiti: thawrat Akhnatun al-rawhiya (Nefertiti: Akhenaton's Spiritual Revolution, novel). Cairo: Dar al-Hilal, 1952.
- ʻArusa ʻala-l-ra (A Doll on the Shelf, novel). Cairo: Dar al-Maʻarif,1954.
- Kulluhunna ʻAyyusha(They Are All ʻAyyusha, novel). Cairo: Dar al-Jumhuriya,1954.
- Thaman al-hubb (The Price of Love, short stories). Cairo: Dar al-ʻUbayd,1955.
- Baqaya rajul (Remnants of a Man, short stories). Beirut: al-Maktaba al-Tijariya,1956.
- Laʻnat al-jasad (Curse of the Body, novel).Beirut: n.p., 1956.
- Dumuʻ al-tawba (Tears of Contrition, novel).Beirut: al-Maktab al-Tijari Press,1958.
- Madrasat al-banat (The Girls' School, short stories). Cairo: Rose al-Yusuf Foundation,1959.
- ʻAsifa fi qalb (A Heart Storm, novel).Cairo: Dar al-Hilal, 1960.
- Nisf imra'a wa qisas ukhra (Half a Womanand Other Stories, short stories). Cairo: Rose al-Yusuf Foundation,1962.
- Layali laha thaman (Nights with a Price, short stories). Cairo: National Book Foundation,1963.
- Muʻjizat al-Nil (Miracle of the Nile, shortstories). Cairo: al-Dar al-Qawmiya, 1964.
- Nawabigh al-nisa' (Distinguished Women, short stories). Cairo: Dar al-Hilal, 1964.
- Alf mabruk (Congratulations, short stories). Cairo: al-Dar al-Misriya,1965.
- Qusur ʻala-l-rimal (Castles on the Sand, novel). Cairo: Rose al-Yusuf Foundation,1967.
- Nabda taht al-jalid (A Pulse Beneath the Ice, short stories). Cairo: General Egyptian Book Organization,1968.
- Arbaʻat rijal wa fatah (Four Men and a Young Woman, short stories). Cairo: Dar al-Hilal,1972.
- Shay' aqwa minha (Something Stronger Than Her, novel). Cairo: al-Hilal Novels,1975.
- al-Qafas al-ahmar (The Red Cage, short stories). Cairo: Dar al-Maʻarif,1975.
- al-Lughz al-abadi (The Eternal Riddle, short stories). Cairo: Maktabat Gharib,1978.
- Arbaʻ masrahiyat dahika (Four Comic Plays, plays). Cairo: General Egyptian Book Organization,1979.
- Hasab al-talab (Made to Order, play). Cairo: General Egyptian Book Organization,1979.
