= Mary Kahil =

Egyptian feminist and Christian mystic

- Born: 28 January 1889; Damietta, Egypt
- Died: 28 June 1979 (aged 90); Zamalek, Egypt
- Occupation: Activist
- Known for: Co-founding the Egyptian Feminist Union and Badaliya sodality

Mary Kahil (28 January 1889 – 28 June 1979) was an Egyptian feminist and Christian mystic. She was a member of the Melkite Greek Catholic Church, a founder of the Egyptian Feminist Union along with Huda Sha'arawi, and promoted Christian–Muslim dialogue in Egypt. She was also an intimate associate of Louis Massignon, with whom she founded the Badaliya movement.

== Life ==
Mary Kahil was born in Damietta on 28 January 1889 to a bourgeois Melkite Greek Catholic family. Her father's family had migrated from Syria to Egypt in 1775 and risen to prominence under the viceregency of Muhammad Ali; her mother was German. She was educated in convent schools in Cairo and Beirut and spent the period of World War I with her mother's family in Europe before returning to Cairo.

After returning to Cairo in 1920, Kahil became a cofounder with Huda Sha'arawi of the Egyptian Feminist Union, one of the first organized women's movements in the Arab world, and served as a secretary and codirector of the Islamic charity Mabarrat Muhammad 'Ali.

Board of the Egyptian Feminist Union circa 1923, Kahil standing center in back.

Significantly, the feminist movement in Egypt was inclusive of both Muslim and Christian women. The main priorities of this movement were to reform the legal rights of women, to outlaw child marriage, and to guarantee equal access to education for women. In addition, they opposed British imperialism, colonialism, and Zionism. Kahil played a leading role in the union's activities, and was during this time associated with Out el Kouloub, Umm Kulthum, and the family of Taha Hussein. Kahil was celibate.

Kahil was a leader in interreligious dialogue in twentieth-century Egypt. Kahil purchased a decommissioned Anglican church in Cairo, which was refounded as a Melkite Greek Catholic parish under the name Our Lady of Peace. In an adjacent house, she founded the Dar-es-Salaam Centre. The institution promoted interreligious dialogue, Arab Christian culture, and Egyptology, hosting annual conferences featuring Christian scholars of Islam until Kahil's death.

Kahil died on 28 June 1979 at her home in Zamalek.

== Relationship with Louis Massignon ==
Kahil first met Louis Massignon in 1912, but did not meet him again until 1934.

In 1934, Kahil and Massignon met again in Cairo, and traveled to Damietta to pray at an abandoned church. When praying at this church, they vowed to live a life of intercession on behalf of Muslims; this was the founding of the Badaliya prayer movement. The two began an intimate correspondence. The correspondence between Massignon and Kahil has been partially published, though Kahil destroyed many of her letters and others are kept in an archive in the Vatican with no public access.

In addition to their shared religious activity, Kahil was the main influence on Massignon's turn to radical political activism on behalf of Algerian Muslims and others. Massignon, in turn, found in his relationship with Kahil a means for the fulfillment of spiritual aspirations which he felt had been frustrated by his marriage and professional life. The two came to understand their friendship in mystical terms, and addressed each other by the Arabic names Ibrahim, Massignon's religious name as a Franciscan tertiary and Maryam, the Arabic form of Kahil's name, extensively quoting Sufi poetry in their letters. Despite their intimacy and collaboration, the friendship was also a source of deep suffering for Kahil. After Massignon's death, Kahil wrote in her journal that she had a vision of Jean-Mohammed Abd-el-Jalil who assured her that Massignon had also suffered in their relationship, which brought her peace while grieving his death.
