= Nabawiyya Musa =

- Nabawiyya Mohamed Musa Badawia
- Born: Nabawiyya Mohamed Musa Badawia; December 17, 1886; Zagazig, Khedivate of Egypt
- Died: April 30, 1951 (aged 64); Alexandria, Kingdom of Egypt
- Known for: Egyptian nationalism, Feminism & women's rights

Nabawiyya Mohamed Musa Badawia (Arabic: نبوية موسى محمد بدوية; December 17, 1886 – April 30, 1951) was an Egyptian Nationalist and Feminist and is recognized as one of the founding feminists of the 20th century in Egypt. Her career and life is often discussed alongside figures such as Huda Sharawi and Malak Hifni Nasif, as all three of these women gave lectures and put on other events to further education, promote health, and reduce sexual exploitation for women, among other things. She grew up in Alexandria and was part of the Egyptian middle-class. Along with being an avid educator, she was a prolific writer. She wrote and published articles such as "al-Ayat al–badyyina fi tarbiya al-banat" (a treatise on girls' education) in 1902, "al-Mar’a wa-l-‘amal" (Woman and Work) in 1920 as well as editing a woman's page for al-Balagh al-usbui (The Weekly News). She is known as the first Egyptian woman to obtain a baccalaureate secondary degree, and her writings are considered important historical documents reflecting the periods of Egyptian history her life spanned, especially Egyptian life under rule of the British protectorate.

== Education ==
Nabawiya Mohamed Musa Badawia was a Zagazigi fallahi (peasant) woman who exhibited strong principles of nationalism and feminism even as a young woman. She stood for the rights of her nation and fellow Egyptian women. Her father, an Egyptian Captain(junior officer), owned for his family a country house, but was never seen by his daughter as he was sent and died on a mission to Sudan during the Mahdist War 2 months before she was born. She, her older brother Muhammad Musa, and her mother (now a widow) thereafter moved to Cairo for her brother's sake, to continue his schooling. Her family initially lived off his military pension and lands left behind.

Nabawiyya Musa was one of the first and last women to complete the education exam and be accepted into the Saniyya School under colonial rule, due to fears at the time of women's empowerment in a patriarchal society. In her childhood, her brother helped her learn to read in both English and Arabic, write, and memorize the Quran at home, and she was self-taught at maths and poetry.

By the time she turned thirteen, she was keen on continuing her education in school, but her mother refused and her brother threatened to disown her. Defying the established social norms of the time, she stole her mother's stamp and sold her gold bracelet and, disguised as a maid, applied for school, continuing her studies secretly against her family's wishes. She became one of the top 10 among 250 students in her school and ironically outperformed future poet and peer student Abbas Mahmoud al-Aqqad.

She finished her secondary school exam in 1907, though Egypt did not establish formal secondary schools that would prepare for that exam or upper education until after Egyptian Independence. In 1908, she finished her degree in education and went on to be a prominent educator in the state school system for the middle-class and an advocate for women's rights, she got equal pay as male peers. After 1922, more women were let into the newly established Egyptian University; by this time Nabawiyya Musa was a key lecturer and leader among her colleagues.

== Career ==
Nabawiyya Musa was an avid writer and educator who gave lectures around Egypt advocating for the education of women. She believed strongly that educated women would only improve the state by being able to be independent, bring in money for the household as middle-class women and/or raise their children to be independent so they could grow up to be assets to society. She believed strongly that the lack of hierarchy in the peasant and lower classes was a good model of how women can be an asset to productivity via equal opportunities with men. She knew that the differences between men and women were nothing but a social construct and could easily be broken with time. Through promoting women's education, she sought to end sexual violence against women. She believed that giving women an equal status in the workforce and in education would make them less vulnerable and less prone to sexual violence.

For the two years immediately after finishing her exam, she published papers on educational, literary and social issues, while teaching, for the Young Egypt Party and Egyptian Gazette, her publications under a British pseudonym for the former was leaked by her patriarchal peers to her superiors in her school, using the pseudonym to manufacture the rumor that she supported British occupation. She was almost permanently dismissed as the Ministry didn't allow teachers to write for newspapers.

In 1909, she became the first ever female primary school president, for a girls primary school in Faiyum.

Her book Woman and Work was published in 1920.

She founded the Association for the Progress of Women in 1922. She was also a founding member of the Egyptian Feminist Union in 1923.

By 1937, she was a headmaster over 2 different schools in Cairo and Alexandria, and by an underdetermined date, had written a historical novel named "Virtue" (توب حتب)

She helped found a woman's magazine in Egypt called majallat al-fata ("the young woman's magazine"), to which she contributed an autobiographical column called "my memoirs" from 1937 to 1942. She wrote 91 installments that were later compiled into a book under the title "My history, by my pen", and published by her own Alexandrian publishing house, making her one of the first Muslim women with a published autobiography.

== Feminist movement ==
Nabawiyya Musa was an integral part in the feminist movement in Egypt. She stood out because many of her views echoed very strong Egyptian Nationalism as well as equal opportunities for women. Along with highlighting the education of women, she was also a leading role model in breaking down the social constructs of women. She and her partners in the feminist movement believed that a radical call for unveiling of women was not needed in the beginning of the movement because Egypt was not ready to accept it. However, after attending a conference in Rome in 1923, she, along with Huda Shaarawi and Ceza Nabarawi, came back to Egypt unveiled as a proclamation to Egyptian society.

== Death ==
Musa was imprisoned by the Egyptian Wafd government in 1948 after criticizing Egypt for supporting Britain in the Second World War, ending her career. After eight years of retirement, Musa died on April 30, 1951.
