= Amīnah al-Saʿīd =

Egyptian journalist and women's rights activist

- Born: Amīnah Saʻīd; January 20, 1914 (age 112); Asyut
- Died: 17 August 1995 (aged 81)
- Citizenship: Egypt
- Occupations: journalist; women's rights activist
- Employer: Al-Musawar
- Notable work: first women's magazine; al-Jamiha (The Defiant Woman)

Amīnah al-Saʿīd also known as Amīnah Saʻīd (1914–1995; Arabic: أمينة السعيد) was an Egyptian journalist and women's rights activist. She founded Egypt's first women's magazine and was the first woman magazine editor in the Middle East.

== Biography ==
Saʿīd was born on 20 January 1914 in Asyut, Egypt. She joined the youth wing of the Egyptian Feminist Union at the age of 14. She was among the first women to attend Fuad I University in 1931. She earned a degree in English literature in 1935. Saʿīd was opposed to veiling and played tennis in public without a veil. She joined the news magazine Al-Musawar as a columnist. She published a novel titled al-Jamiha ("The Defiant Woman") in the 1950s.

Saʿīd founded Hawaa in 1954 under one of the biggest publishing companies, Dar al-Hilal. She was among the earliest full-time female journalists in the country and even becoming an elected member in the council of Reporters' Syndicate. From 1958 to 1969 she was secretary general of the Pan-Arab League Women's Union. She became editor of Al-Musawar in 1973. From 1976 to 1985 she chaired the magazine's publishing group.

Saʿīd died of cancer at age 81 on 13 August 1995 in Cairo.

=== Public and Career Life ===
Al-Saʿīd engagement with feminism began early in her life. In 1929, at the age of 15, she met Huda Sha'arawi during a visit to the Shubra Secondary School of Girls. In 1933, al-Saʿīd contributed the Egyptian Feminist Union (EFU) by co-founding Shaqiqat (Sisters). Before her advocacy began, al-Saʿīd had been an avid critic of Duriya Shafiq, who supported and was a role model for the new political regime. This was an organization that represented he younger generation of the EFU and it was made up of mainly upper-class and middle-class women who graduation from the newly established government secondary schools. Despite her alignment with liberal feminism, Al-Saʿīd did not join the National Feminist Party or the Daughter of the Nile organizations but rather stayed loyal to the EFU.

Al-Saʿīd also played an important role in the feminist struggle for political rights. In February 1951, she supported Doria Shack's mass rally to pressure Parliament for women's suffrage. After the 1952 revolution, Shafik continued advocating for women's political rights and even staged a hunger strike in 1954; Al-Saʿīd endorsed this through her platform as a journalist. She delivered lectures and wrote many editorials in Hawaa. In a 1955 article, she argued that democracy required female political participation and even asserted that women, as taxpayers, deserved the right to vote.

1956 was an important year for Egyptian women. In January, Nasser had introduced a republican constitution that granted women political rights for the first time. However, this also allowed the regime for have authoritarian control and suppression of political oppositions across the spectrum. This eventually led to the dismantling of feminist organizations. During all this Amīnah al-Saʿīd had remained silent, despite her prominent status. This led to her receiving criticism for failing to protest on government repression, including the exiled of feminist leader Doria Shafik and the mass intellectuals in 1981. Al-Saʿīd did eventually acknowledge the incident but ended up framing it as a political miscalculation rather than condemning it on moral grounds.

Despite the discourse around her contributions or lack thereof as a feminist, she did use her platform to point out the legacy of pre-revolutionary feminists, particularly her mentor, Huda Sha'rawi. In an editorial marking women's enfranchisement, al-Saʿīd credited Sha'rawi for laying the foundation for gender equality, portraying Nasser as the leader who fulfilled her vision.

Amina al-Saʿīd wrote: "Whenever I visit a foreign country for the first time … I compare the status of women there with the status of our women, and from this, I derive a comparison … the place of the modern Egyptian woman in the pageant of world civilization." Her comparative view allowed for women to be placed within a global heirearchy of progress. When she travelled to other Arab countries she wrote: "Whenever I go to the region of our Arab brothers and sisters, I find afflicted women. They fervently desire to follow our example and would benefit greatly if we took them by the hand in their striving to achieve a better life … If we truly wish to preserve our leadership in our greater nation (the Arab world), it is not right to confine our efforts to ourselves."

==== Feminist Leadership with Hawaa' ====
Al-Saʿīd also emphasized the continuity of female leadership through Hawwa'. In 1956, there was a debate sparked by a reader's concern over the lack of emerging feminist leaders. Al-Saʿīd had countered this by redefining leadership. She argued that women like herself had not looked for personal recognition but had fought for equality, ushering in a better future for later generations.

Many discourses happened after the policies of Nasser's government were implemented. Al-Saʿīd, through Hawaa', actively engaged in these debates. She advocated for women's access to the public sphere, mainly as employees, and worked to re-define women's roles, capabilities and moral qualities in the context of modern Egypt. She contributed to discussions surrounding the concept of ikhtilat, which refers to the sharing of public spaces by men and women, extended beyond defending women's moral integrity. While she did not reject gender-specific codes of conduct, she advocated for the normalization of hetero-social relations. Al-Saʿid’s advocacy for ikhtilat extended beyond university settings to professional environments. She argued that universities played a crucial role in teaching students how to interact with the opposite sex in a respectful manner, thus preparing them for their future careers. For al-Saʿid, the university was not only an academic institution but also a social space where students could learn the norms of inter-gender relations, which would later be applied in professional settings.

=== Posthumous Debate ===
A few days after Amina al-Saʿīd's death, on August 17, 1995, The Guardian published an obituary by renowned Egyptian feminist and writer Nasal al-Saadawi. In her tribute, Saadawi reflected on her encounters with al-Saʿīd and she portrayed al-Saʿīd as a conservative figure who prioritized her social status and political connections over feminist principles. Saadawi's obituary sparked a lot of backlash and a response titled "Fighter for the Women of Egypt," written by Hoda Gindi, a professor at Cairo University, and Michael Croucher, a BBC journalist.

== See also ==
- Feminism in Egypt
