= Suhayr al-Qalamawi =

Egyptian writer (1911–1997)

Sahier al-Qalamawi
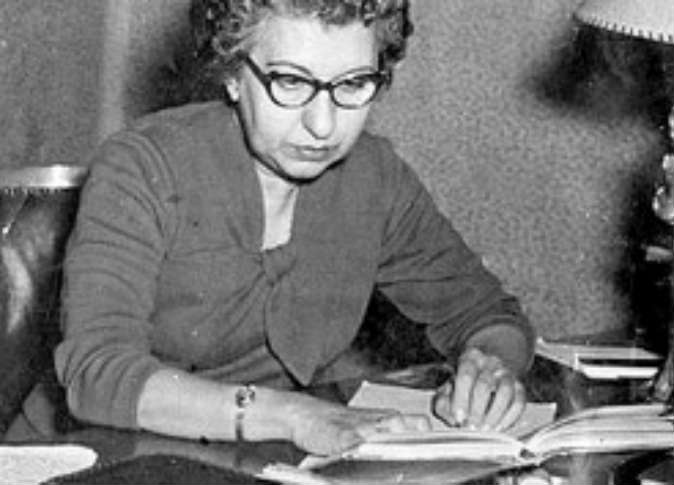
- Sahier al-Qalamawi
- Born: July 20, 1911 Cairo, Egypt
- Died: May 4, 1997 (aged 85) Cairo, Egypt

Sahier al-Qalamawi (Note: Also Latinized as Suhayr al-Qalamawi, Suhair al-Qalamawi, Soheir al-Qalamawy, Suhair el-Calamawy, and Soheir el-Qalamawy.) (Arabic: سهير القلماوي; July 20, 1911 – May 4, 1997) was a significant literary figure and politician from Egypt who shaped Arabic writing and culture through her writing, feminist activism, and advocacy. She was one of the first women to attend Cairo University and in 1941 became the first Egyptian woman to earn her Master of Arts Degree and PhD for her work in Arabic literature. After graduating, she was employed by the university as their first woman lecturer. Al-Qalamawi was also one of the first women to hold a number of chief positions including chairperson of the Arabic Department at Cairo University, president of the Egyptian Feminist Union, and president of the League of Arab Women University Graduates. Her writings include two volumes of short stories, ten critical studies, and many translations from world literature.Aḥādīth jaddatī (My Grandmother's Tales) was published in 1935.

== Biography ==
=== Early life ===
Sahier al-Qalamawi was born on July 20, 1911, in Cairo, Egypt and lived there throughout her life. She was born to a family that took pride in educating its female members and therefore she was able to take advantage of her father's extensive library of works at an early age. Exposure to authors like Taha Hussein, Rifa'a al-Tahtawi, and Ibn Iyas helped advance her literary talent and shape her voice as a writer.

As a child during the Egyptian Revolution of 1919, al-Qalamawi grew up with influences from the Egyptian women at the time including legendary feminist Huda Sha'arawi and nationalist figure Safia Zaghoul. These women and other feminists at the time focused on moving feminist debate into the streets to create a more far reaching movement. This goal influenced some of al-Qalamawi's feminist ideals.

=== Education ===
In 1928, al-Qalamawi graduated the American College for girls and intended to study medicine like her father at Cairo University. However, upon receiving a rejection, she was encouraged by her father to instead specialize in Arabic Literature. She became the first young girl to attend Cairo University and the only female among fourteen males to study Arabic Literature. During her time at Cairo University, al-Qalamawi received guidance from Dr. Taha Hussein who was the chairperson of the Arabic Department and editor in chief of the Cairo University Magazine. He made al-Qalamawi the assistant editor of the Cairo University Magazine in 1932 and thus al-Qalamawi became the first woman with a license in journalism in Egypt. During her years as a student, she was also a broadcaster for the Egyptian Radio Broadcasting service. After earning her Masters of Arts degree, she received a scholarship to do research in Paris for her PhD. In 1941, after completing her thesis, she became the first woman to receive a PhD from Cairo University.

=== Career ===
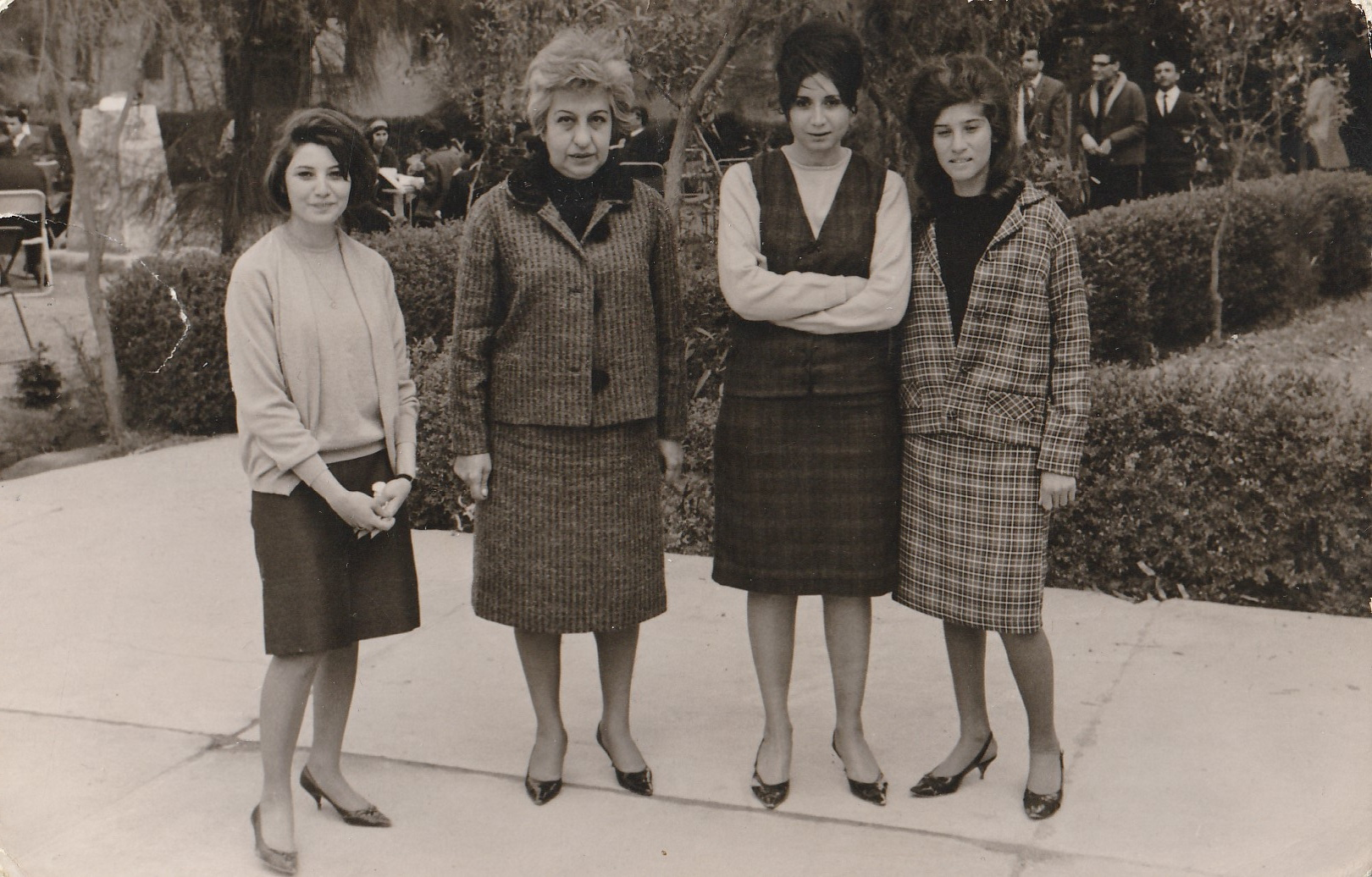
Suhayr al-Qalamawi, a visit to the Baghdad University's College of Arts, Department of Arabic Language. Iraq, early 1960s.

She was a woman of many “firsts” and began her career as the first woman lecturer at Cairo University in 1936. She soon worked her way up to professor and later chairperson of the Arabic Department between the years 1958-1967 and was the first woman to do so.

She served as the president of the Egyptian Feminist Union and in 1959, she became the head of the League of Arab Women University Graduates where she set the basis of cooperation between the Egyptian Union and the World Union of Universities. Later, she was the head of the Egyptian General Authority for Cinema, Theater, and Music in 1967 and the head of the Children's Culture Community in 1968.

Al-Qalamawi contributed to the fight for women's rights not only through literary works, but also through her participation in Arab Women's Conferences where she advocated for equal rights. In 1960, she was the president of the International Conference on Woman; by 1961 she was the head of the first conference on Folkloric Arts. She established a committee to superintend the university Palestinian girls to address her concern of the Palestinian issue in 1962.

Her political career began when she entered the political arena as a member of parliament in 1958 until 1964 and again in 1979 until 1984. She was also the director of the government affiliated Egyptian Organization for Publishing and Distributing where she worked to broaden the audience of readers, encourage young writers, and promote the book industry. In 1967, she established the Middle East's first international book fair: the Cairo International Book Fair. During her last few years, she served as the Head of the General Book Organization from 1967 to 1971 and president of the Board of Censorship from 1982 to 1985.

Starting as early as 1935, she published a wide array of literary works including short stories, critical studies, cultural magazines, and translations. She died in Cairo on May 4, 1997.

== Writing and themes ==
Among her more than eighty publications, al-Qalamawi's earliest and most famous work is her first volume of short stories published in 1935. This work, which was published in Cairo, was also the first volume of short stories to be published by a woman in Egypt. In Ahadith Jaddati (My Grandmother’s Tales), al-Qalamawi analyzes the female social role as a preserver and renewer of community history through oral narrative in this work. The volume is framed by the story of a grandmother reminiscing about the past to her granddaughter. She develops this story line into a social criticism and vision of wartime form the perspective of the civilians who stayed home. The grandmother extracts morals from her recollection of events and draws comparisons between the past and present, often favoring the past. Al-Qalamawi suggests through this work that old wives’ tales and grandmothers’ bedtime stories can contain a deep feminist message. Like many other works of fiction in the 1930s, her collection of stories provides realistic depictions of Egyptian middle class society and, through middle class eyes, a view of peasant society.

The thesis that earned al-Qalamawi her PhD, a research paper on Alf Lailah wa Lailah (One Thousand and One Nights), lays the foundations of her feminist mission. She aims to create the new woman: an intelligent, cultured, and wise woman who is fully in charge of her life and family. This woman not only uses her wits and virtues to reach equality with men, but also strives to re-educate men in order to gain equality. This message was further developed in her books on literary criticism, “Limitation in Literature” (1955) and “The World Between Two Bookcovers” (1958).

Her translations of works such as Chinese stories by Pearl Buck (1950) and Shakespeare’s “The Taming of the Shrew” (1964) further illustrate women's struggles and the need to re-educate men. Al-Qalamawi also founded and released several cultural magazines that dealt with contemporary subjects such as cinema, music and the arts. Other significant works include “The Devils Play and Dance” (1965), “The Dissident’s Literature (1941), and “The World in a Book” (1958).

Her work has been received warmly by critics; many regard her as a "remarkable literary figure of the contemporary cultural movement in Egypt."

== Tribute ==
On July 20, 2014, Google dedicated a Doodle to the writer for the 103rd anniversary of her birth. The Doodle reached all the countries of the Arab World.

== Awards ==
Al-Qalamawi received awards and recognition for her literary work, leadership, and advocacy. These awards include:

1. Award of the Arabic Language Academy, for her Ph.D. thesis on "Arabian Nights", 1945.
2. State Merit Award in Youths’ Literature, she was the first woman to obtain it 1955.
3. State Encouragement Prize, 1955.
4. State Merit Award in Literature, shared with Dr. Shawki Deif, 1963.
5. Nasser's Award, dedicated by the former Soviet Union, 1976.
6. State Merit Award in Literature, 1977.
7. Medal of Appreciation, 1977.
8. Medal of the Republic, first class, 1978.
9. Medal of Achievement, 1978.
10. State Appreciation Prize for Literature
11. Honorary Doctorate from the American University in Cairo, (AUC), 1987.

In addition, she was honored by the Cairo International Book Fair in 1993 for serving as the president of the General Egyptian Book Organization. In 1955, she was honored by the Cairo Governorate for Egyptian Women's Day.
