= Arab Feminist Union =

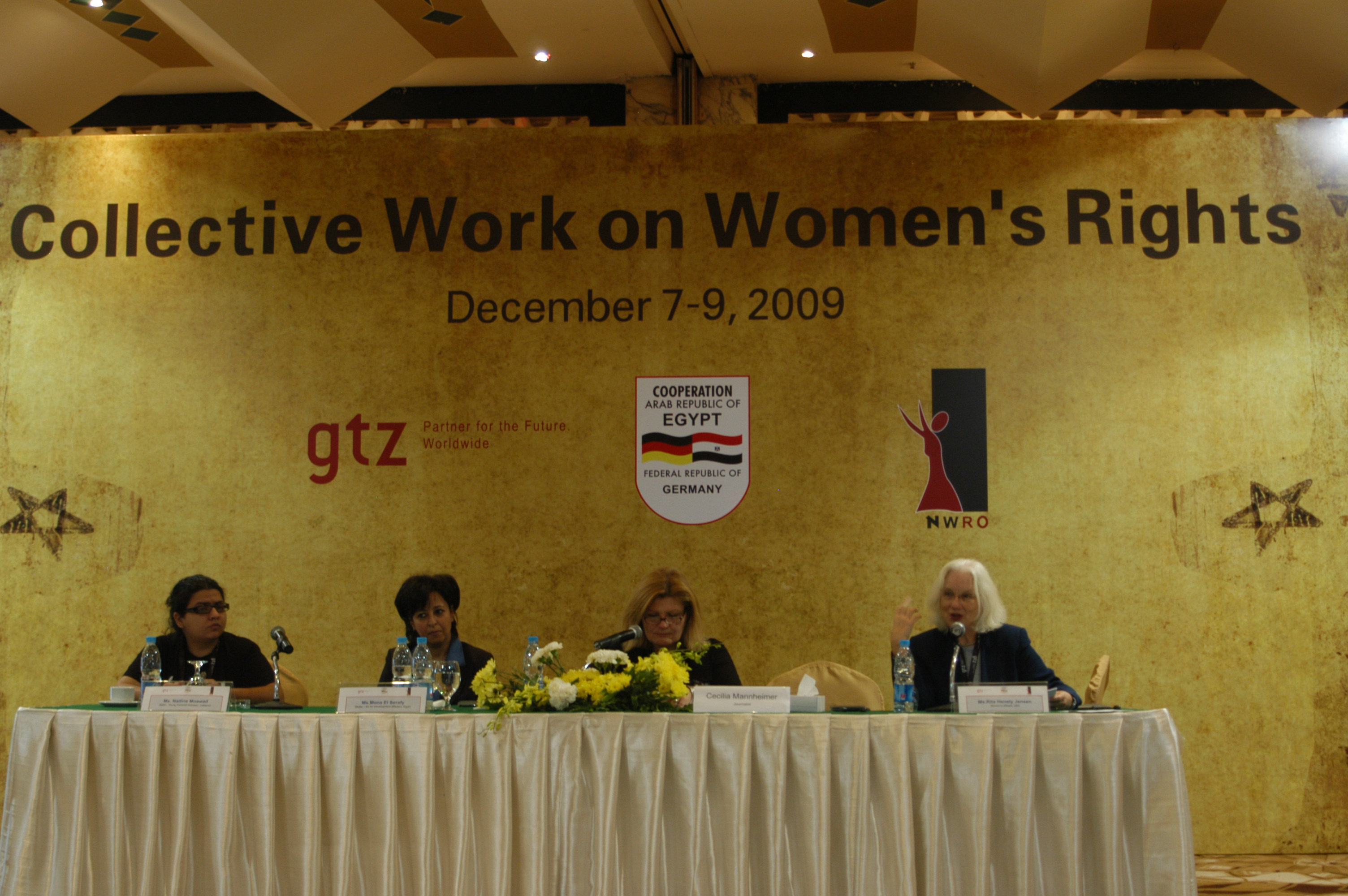
Conference on Arab women's rights held in 2009.

Arab Feminist Union (AFU) was an umbrella organization of feminist associations from Arab countries, founded in 1945. Its purpose was to achieve social and political gender equality while promoting Arab nationalism.

In 1938, the EFU organized the Eastern Women’s Conference for the Defense of Palestine in Cairo. The AFU, when it was founded, served as an extension to the Arab Women's Association of Palestine (AWA). The purpose of AFU's founding was to encourage Arab nationalism, which was accomplished by promoting the collaboration of feminist associations among different Arab countries.

The AFU's creation linked a range of nationalist, literary, and reform-oriented movements from Palestinian and Sudanese women active in anti-colonial struggles to Algerian women participating in the independence war.

== History and founding of the AFU ==
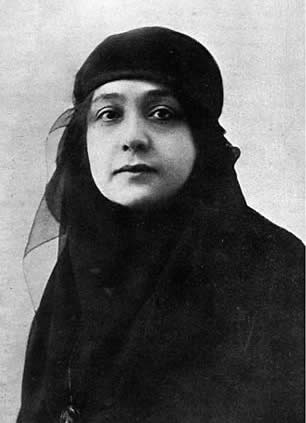
Huda Sha'arawi, Egyptian feminist and founder of the Egyptian Feminist Union (EFU), and the Arab Feminist Union (AFU).

Arab feminist consciousness co-developed with nationalist movements in the 19th and early 20th centuries. Scholars argue that these movements emerged partly in response to Western imperial influence in the region. Since Arab feminist consciousness arose along with nationalist movements, feminism was often ideologically associated with Western imperialism. This weakened feminism within Arab countries: Those who opposed feminism believed that its connection to Western capitalism stripped women of their culture and conservative values, such as those related to family and religion.

The EFU was the starting point of the organized feminist movement in the Arab World when it was founded in 1923. Huda Sha'arawi founded the Egyptian Feminist Union (EFU), a precursor to the AFU. Becoming a member of the International Women Suffrage Alliance and Women’s International League for Peace and Freedom, the EFU and AFU wished to organize the women's movement of the Arab world internationally, in the same manner as the women's movement in the West.

The implementation of a Pan-Arab feminist ideology was previously attempted by the EFU in the 1940s, when its leaders confronted the universalist assumptions of international feminist bodies that treated women's circumstances, oppressions, and demands as interchangeable. As opposition to British rule in Egypt and Palestine intensified, EFU activists observed that imperial interests were routinely prioritized over gender justice within the International Alliance of Women (IAW). These tensions prompted EFU leaders to propose regional feminist unions.

The 1944 Arab Feminist Congress was a conference held by the EFU which also established the AFU. The AFU was based in Egypt. Sha'arawi became the AFU’s first president. Its treasurer and secretary were also Egyptians. Trans-Jordan, Iraq, Syria, Palestine, and Lebanon were given two representatives each on the board. The EFU prioritized equality among men and women through education and social welfare, whereas the AFU prioritized alliances between various Arab feminist associations to achieve social and political equality.

In 1945, the first constitution of the AFU was drafted. The AFU discussed women's roles within representative countries in relation to the national construct. Also, they sought to affect the personal status laws in these countries in order to widen women's rights. In particular, they addressed the issue of prostitution from western militaries.

After its creation, the AFU allied with other Arab feminist associations. The AFU's main priority was to achieve gender equality, but members also dedicated their efforts to enhancing and spreading nationalism across all Arab countries. In addition, the AFU worked actively to promote an exchange of ideas across regions. The AFU provided a platform for feminists from Egypt, Palestine, Syria, Jordan and Iraq to fortify strategies against patriarchy and state authority across borders. Then, in 1945, the AFU published Al-Arabiya, the first Pan-Arab women's journal.

== Challenges and decline ==
During the 1950s and 1960s, newly independent Arab states adopted centralized, often authoritarian political systems that tightened control over civil society and voluntary associations, including feminist organizations. During this period, the AFU was temporarily required to operate under the name "Arab Women's Union" in order to avoid official scrutiny of the term "feminism." Government officials viewed the term "feminism" as politically subversive due to its perceived association with Western influence and opposition movements. Many national chapters were restricted to providing social services or reframing their activities in accordance with their respective state's political agendas. After the 1952 Egyptian Revolution, Egypt gained semi-autonomy. As Egypt's economy shifted toward a more capitalist structure, increased competition and restructuring of the labor market limited many women's access to paid employment. These changes intensified class differences between upper and lower income women and prompted new forms of feminist activism that criticized social conservatism and the economic policies that marginalized women workers. The post-revolutionary period resulted in the first prime minister and later president of Egypt, Gamal Abdel Nasser. Under Nasser's regime, state consolidation policies required female associations to be registered, monitored, and controlled. Furthermore, mobility narrowed as representatives needed visas to attend conferences.

In 1956, the Egyptian government forced the closure of the EFU. The AFU moved its headquarters from Cairo to Beirut, Lebanon. Without the leadership and institutional support of the EFU, the AFU could not effectively sustain its operations in Beirut and ultimately declined over time.

== Impact and legacy ==
The AFU had a lasting impact on Arab feminist organizing by helping to institutionalize regional networks and forms of women's public expression.

As part of a broader feminist genealogy in which writers and activists, since the 19th century, had used salons, journals, writing and poetry to advocate women's rights and to reinterpret cultural heritage, the AFU continued these efforts by participating in a longer history of women's print culture.

Figures like Hind Nawfal founded some of the earliest women-edited newspapers in Cairo. By the 1970s and 80s, the print tradition generated by AFU's journal Al-Arabiya had normalized women's authorship, leading to the formation of women-run publishing houses, like the Arab Women's Solidarity Association Press in Cairo and Gada Samman Press in Beirut. The growing ecosystem of women-edited newspapers, magazines, and later women-run publishing houses gave activists scattered across colonial and national borders a common textual space while supporting a growing readership of women's writing.

The AFU created one of the earliest Pan-Arab feminist frameworks. The regional organizational model created by the union allowed members to respond to patriarchy and state authority from a nationalist and feminist point of view. Its activities expanded and unified the Arab feminist movements and created widespread optimism that such an organization could accelerate women's political and economic standing, during an era of decolonization. The AFU helped to solidify a regional feminist identity that continued to influence later organizations, like the Arab Women's Solidarity Association in the 1980s. Although the AFU was later disbanded by state consolidation of the authoritarian Egyptian regime, scholars view the AFU as a precedent to the modern transnational Arab feminist initiatives, with its early efforts to decolonize feminist praxis continuing to influence Pan-Arab feminist solidarity.
