= Malak Hifni Nasif =

Egyptian feminist (1886 – 1918)

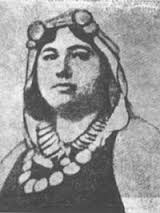
- Born: 25 December 1886; Cairo
- Died: 17 October 1918 (aged 31)

Academic background
- Education: Saniyyah Teacher Training College

Academic work
- Institutions: Union for the Education of Women
- Main interests: Feminism

Malak Hifni Nasif (25 December 1886 – 17 October 1918) was an Egyptian feminist who contributed greatly to the intellectual and political discourse on the advancement of Egyptian women in the early 20th century.

== Personal life ==
Malak was born in Cairo in 1886 to a middle-class family; her mother was Saniyyah Abd al-Karim Jalal, and her father was Hifni Bey Nasif, a lawyer who was a follower of Muhammad Abduh. At one time a student of Al-Afghani, Nasif was the author of several textbooks used in Egyptian schools and was one of the five signatories to the 1342 Cairo text.

Malak's father encouraged her to learn and pursue formal education. Growing up, she often read Arabic poetry and began writing in her free time. Malak was also raised with a strong connection to native Egyptian culture, with her father teaching her the Arabic language and Arabic culture from an early age.

Malak was part of the first graduating class from the Girls’ Section of the ‘Abbas Primary School in 1901. She continued her education at the Saniyyah Teacher Training College, where she graduated at the top of her class in 1903. Malak returned to the ‘Abbas School to teach for two years. She was forced to quit when she married Abd al-Satar al-Basil Pasha in 1907. At the time, Egyptian law forbid women from teaching while married.

At this point, Malak moved with al-Basil to al-Fayyum, in the desert, and she began writing under the pseudonym Bahithat al-Badiya ("Seeker in the Desert"). It was there that she found out that her husband already had a wife and a child. The treatment she received from al-Basil, as well as the observations she made of other women, led her to write thoughtfully and directly about the status of women in Egypt. She corresponded significantly with other writers and friends, such as May Ziadah, and she responded critically to major male writers of the time, like Qasim Amin. Malak stayed with al-Basil for 11 years until she died of influenza in 1918, during the global pandemic.

== Feminist writings ==
Malak lived in Egypt during a period of growing intellectual and political discourse on the status of women in society. This time period included influential players like Huda Sha'arawi, Qasim Amin, Nabawiyya Musa, and many more. During the same period, nationalist and traditionalist thinkers went back and forth with various ideas being formulated about the future of the Middle East. These two conversations were intrinsically linked and had a significant overlap. Malak entered this dialogue and presented her "attempt at reform" for an Egyptian future.

Malak first began publishing works in Al Jarida, the major newspaper of the Umma party. Malak also spoke often at universities and the Umma party headquarters. In 1909, she published Al-Nisa’iyyat, a collection of many of her talks and essays. Through these methods, she raised her own voice for the advancement of women.

The dominant feminist ideas at the time tended to associate the advancement of women with Westernization and movement towards a more European-like society. Women like Huda Sha’rawi supported actions such as unveiling, considering such an act constituitive of "progress" towards a more European, more liberated world for women. Malak agreed on some level with her contemporaries, but is also considered to have generated her own original ideas about such matters. Her ideas often contrasted with the leading Westernization-feminism conflation; she combined westernization with Islam and traditionalism, claiming that only a combination of the two would move women in the right direction. She presented these views by writing on a number of different issues, including unveiling, marriage, and education.

=== Unveiling ===
During the early 1900s, many elite women began using unveiling, or the public removal of their face veils, as a symbol of feminism. Writers like Qasim Amin advocated unveiling as a strategy for women to show their power and liberation. Malak, on the other hand, was opposed to unveiling and did not believe that it should be used in this way. She believed that many of the wealthier women who unveiled were doing so because of an obsession with European fashion, not because of a desire for freedom or because they felt repressed by the veil. She also argued that the veil had been a part of the culture for a long time and that banning it would be too abrupt a change for many women. She was wary of the west and colonial narratives that were disguised in the arguments for unveiling. Malak called for women to be wary of men who, at first, ordered women to wear a veil and then suddenly ordered them not to for the purpose of their ‘liberation.’ Her views on the veil differed from Egyptian feminist writers whose works were popular in the West, such as Qasim Amin and Huda Sha'rawi.

In her book Al-Nisa'iyyat, she set out her specific arguments against unveiling: she argued that women were accustomed to veiling and therefore if they unveiled too quickly women would not know how to behave. She warned that men who advocated for unveiling did not understand or live women's experiences, therefore their opinions were not grounded in fact: for example, they did not take into consideration that if women unveiled, they would be harassed in the streets by men. From her analysis of Egyptian society she argued that men and women were not ready for women to unveil, because women were naive and men were lacking in morals and politeness. She advocated instead for society to work step by step, gradually educating women and improving men's morals. Only once society had been reformed could women make decisions as to whether to veil or not.

=== Marriage ===
Malak wrote extensively about the marital rights of women in Egypt. This issue was one of the feminist issues with which she had significant personal experience. The fact that her husband had two wives caused her to intensely oppose polygamy. In an article entitled “Or Co-Wives”, she deemed polyandry “women’s mortal enemy.” She felt that significant changes must be made with regards to marriage; polyandry must end, men and women must both be able to divorce, and the age at which women marry must increase to at least sixteen. She argued that all of these reforms stem from one central idea: love must be the basis for all marriage. Malak despised the idea of a marriage rooted in economic reasons, i.e., a man marrying a woman simply for her money. She also supported her arguments against early marriage by commenting that women who married early often developed hysteria.

=== Education ===
Malak viewed education reform as one of the most promising solutions to many of the problems that women faced. In her writings, she expressed that any girl that did not have an opportunity to attend and finish school had been treated unjustly. She shared this sentiment with the other feminists of the time. She did not believe, though, that just any education would suffice. She opposed the implementation of missionary schools in Egypt, arguing that “the most ignorant of girls are the graduates of the missionary schools.” Malak called for more Egyptian control over the public education system to create schools that taught girls a more comprehensive curriculum, including history of Egyptian culture.

Malak diverged from others further when she extended her argument and claimed that formal education alone could not solve women's problems. She believed that much of the women's injustice resided in the home, that tarbiya, or the process of raising a child, was responsible for a woman's future. She emphasized the difference between European mothers and Egyptian mothers in caring for their children; Egyptian mothers did not take care of their daughters’ physical health and mental development nearly as well as European mothers did. She argued that mothers must teach their girls to feel empathy for others, to take care of themselves, and to take care of their own children. Malak proposed reforms to better teach religion to girls, to expand schools for female nurses, to increase access to healthcare for women, and to teach hygienic practices. The practice of child rearing was one of the areas in which Malak thought that some Westernization would benefit Egyptian society, but she also believed strongly in the importance of teaching Islam to children. Overall, she believed that most aspects of women's education needed significant reform.

== Politics ==
Malak took action on her views by starting organizations and seeking political action. One aspect of her political activity was connection with women from other countries. She founded the Union for the Education of Women, which brought Egyptian women together with other Arab and European women. Malak later founded an emergency health service based on the Red Cross and a nursing school for women in her own home.

One of Malak's most significant political actions was her presentation of a ten-point program for the improvement of women to the Egyptian Legislative Assembly in 1911. She laid out five points as to how education should be improved: it should have religious orientation; it should be required up to primary school; it should include hygiene, childrearing, first aid, and economics; it should include training for women in nursing and teaching professions; and it should be open to all women for higher studies. She asked for legislation on all of these points. The other five points focused on other women's rights like marriage age and unveiling. Though this program was ignored by the assembly, it was a major example of a woman taking charge of feminism in a political forum.

== Death and legacy ==
Malak died of influenza at the age of 31 on 17 October 1918. Her funeral was attended by an array of feminists and government leaders. On the seventh anniversary of Nasif's death, Huda Sha’rawi held another commemoration that included the predominant feminist thinkers Nabawiyya Musa and May Ziadah. While Nasif left a powerful legacy and was remembered by all of her contemporaries, her unique feminist perspective died with her, and Sha’rawi became the foremost feminist thinker of the time
