= The Harem Years =

1986 memoir by Huda Sha'arawi

- Author: Huda Sha'arawi
- Language: English
- Genre: Autobiography
- Publisher: Virago
- Publication date: 1986
- ISBN: 978-0935312706

The Harem Years is a memoir by Huda Sha'arawi. It provides her firsthand account of the private world of a harem in colonial Cairo.

Sha'arawi (1879–1947) was among the last generation of Egyptian women to live in the segregated world of the harem. Her feminist activism grew out of her involvement in Egypt's nationalist struggle, and led to her founding of the Egyptian Feminist Union in 1923.

In 1987, her memoir, The Harem Years, was published under the name Harem Years: The Memoirs of an Egyptian Feminist, 1879–1924. In this book Sha'arawi recalls her childhood and early adult life in the seclusion of an upper-class Egyptian household, including her marriage at age thirteen. Her subsequent separation from her husband gave her time for an extended formal education, as well as an unexpected taste of independence. Sha'arawi's feminist activism grew, along with her involvement in Egypt's nationalist struggle, culminating in 1923 when she publicly removed her veil in a Cairo railroad station, a daring act of defiance.
