= Iqbal Baraka =

Egyptian journalist (born 1942)

- Born: 1942 (age 83–84); Cairo, Egypt
- Education: Alexandria University; Cairo University

Iqbal Baraka (Arabic: اقبال بركة, romanized: Iqbāl Barakah; born 1942) is an Egyptian journalist, women's rights activist, and writer. She served as editor in chief of the women's magazine Hawaa for over two decades. Baraka is known for her work to advance the role of women in Egyptian and Islamic society. She is considered "one of the most influential feminists in the Arab world."

== Early life and education ==
Baraka was born in 1942 in Cairo, Egypt. She grew up in a liberal, middle-class family in the El Daher district, where she was encouraged to pursue reading and education.

She obtained a bachelor's degree in English from Alexandria University in 1962, and a second bachelor's from Cairo University in Arabic literature in 1979. At Cairo, she studied the role of women in the Quran and hadith.

== Career ==
After graduating from Alexandria University, Baraka worked in public relations for the multinational conglomerate Philips before leaving to work as an interpreter. She then moved to Kuwait for a position as an English teacher.

On returning to Egypt, she began her career as a journalist in English-language radio. She then went to work as an editor for Sabah El Kheir (Good Morning), a magazine affiliated with the Rose al-Yūsuf Group. In this role, she often fought with Islamic thinkers over human rights and the role of women in Islam.

In 1993, she was named editor in chief of the women's magazine Hawaa. Her goal was to convert the conservative magazine, which previously focused on how to be a good housewife, into a source of articles on politics, human rights, and influential women. As she later said: "I take as my basic assumption that women are not simply the tools of fashion designers and manicurists, that women have real and serious interests and concerns we must deal with." She used her column in the magazine to consistently call for gender equality. Baraka ran the magazine for over 20 years, until 2014.

She has also contributed as an editor to Rose al-Yūsuf, Sayidaty, and other magazines. She has written highly charged political columns for a variety of newspapers, including Al-Ahram.

Baraka has written over 20 books, mostly dealing with Muslim women and society. Her first novel, published in 1970, was Friends Forever. Other novels include Dawn for the First Time and Diaries of a Working Woman. Notable nonfiction works include The Hijab: A Modern Vision, Love in Early Islam, Muslim Women in the Conflict of Fez Versus Hat, and The New Woman.

Several of her stories and novels have been adapted into television programs. She has also written scripts for television since 2000.

Baraka has served as president of Egypt's PEN Club and the chair of the women's committee of PEN International. She also co-founded the Association of Egyptian Women Filmmakers.

== Advocacy ==
Baraka, who is Muslim, uses an Islamic framework to advocate for women's rights.

She opposes the hijab, calling it a remnant of the dark ages and declaring it has nothing to do with the religion of Islam itself. She is also in favor of completely abolishing the niqab. Baraka expressed this criticism in her 2002 book The Hijab.

Her calls for gender equality include advocating for co-education at Egypt's universities.

She has been frequently criticized and challenged for her feminist political positions, particularly from religious hardliners, including other Muslim women.

Baraka has also fought discrimination against Copts and other minorities. During the Arab Spring, she spoke in favor of secular leadership in Egypt.

== Recognition ==
Baraka won the Egyptian State Prize for Distinction in 2004. In 2007, she received the Oxfam Novib/PEN Award for Freedom of Expression.

== Selected works ==
=== Fiction ===
- Friends Forever (1970)
- Dawn for the First Time (1975)
- Layla and the Unknown (1980)
- Fishing in the Sea of Illusions (1981)
- Crocodile of the Lake (1983)
- Whenever Spring Returns (1985)
- An Incident of Rape (1993, stories)
- Diaries of a Working Woman (1993)

=== Nonfiction ===
- Love in Early Islam (1998)
- Islam and the Challenges of Our Time (1999)
- Return to Fadda (2001)
- The New Woman (2002)
- The Hijab: A Modern Vision (2002)

=== Travel writing ===
- A Journey to Turkey (1983)
