= L'Égyptienne (magazine) =

Women's magazine in Egypt (1925–1940)

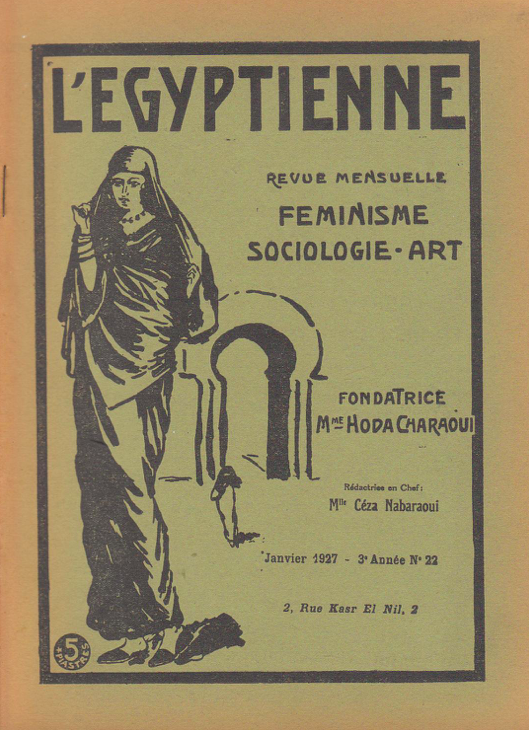
- Editor: Saiza Nabarawi
- Categories: Women's magazine
- Frequency: Monthly
- Publisher: Egyptian Feminist Union
- Founder: Huda Shaarawi
- First issue: 1 February 1925
- Final issue: 1940
- Country: Egypt
- Based in: Cairo
- Language: French

L'Égyptienne was a monthly women's magazine published in Cairo, Egypt, from 1925 to 1940. It was one of the earliest women's magazines and feminist periodicals in the country.

== History and profile ==
L'Égyptienne was established by Huda Shaarawi, and the first issue appeared on 1 February that year. Its editor was Ceza or Saiza Nabarawi. The Egyptian Feminist Union, founded in Cairo by Huda Shaarawi in March 1923, was its publisher. L'Égyptienne was one of two magazines published by the Union.

The logo of L'Égyptienne featured a woman removing her veil. It covered topics from a feminist and Egyptian nationalist angle and was a highly political publication featuring articles and news on party politics in Egypt and national independence. The magazine called for the rights for women to vote in legislative elections.

L'Égyptienne was published monthly and was also distributed abroad. It targeted upper class Egyptian women who were educated at French schools or in France, but also addressed international feminist circles. Egyptian feminist Doria Shafik was among the contributors of the magazine. Another contributor was Kadria Hussein, an Egyptian royal.

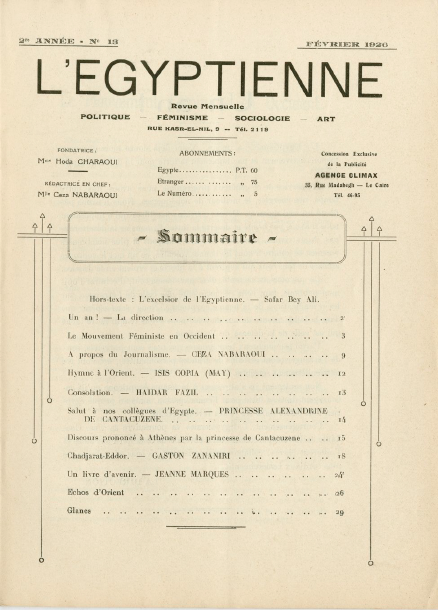
Index page of the magazine

The magazine ceased publication in 1940 when World War II began.

== See also ==
- List of magazines in Egypt
