= Al-Musawar =

Weekly news magazine in Egypt

Al-Mussawar

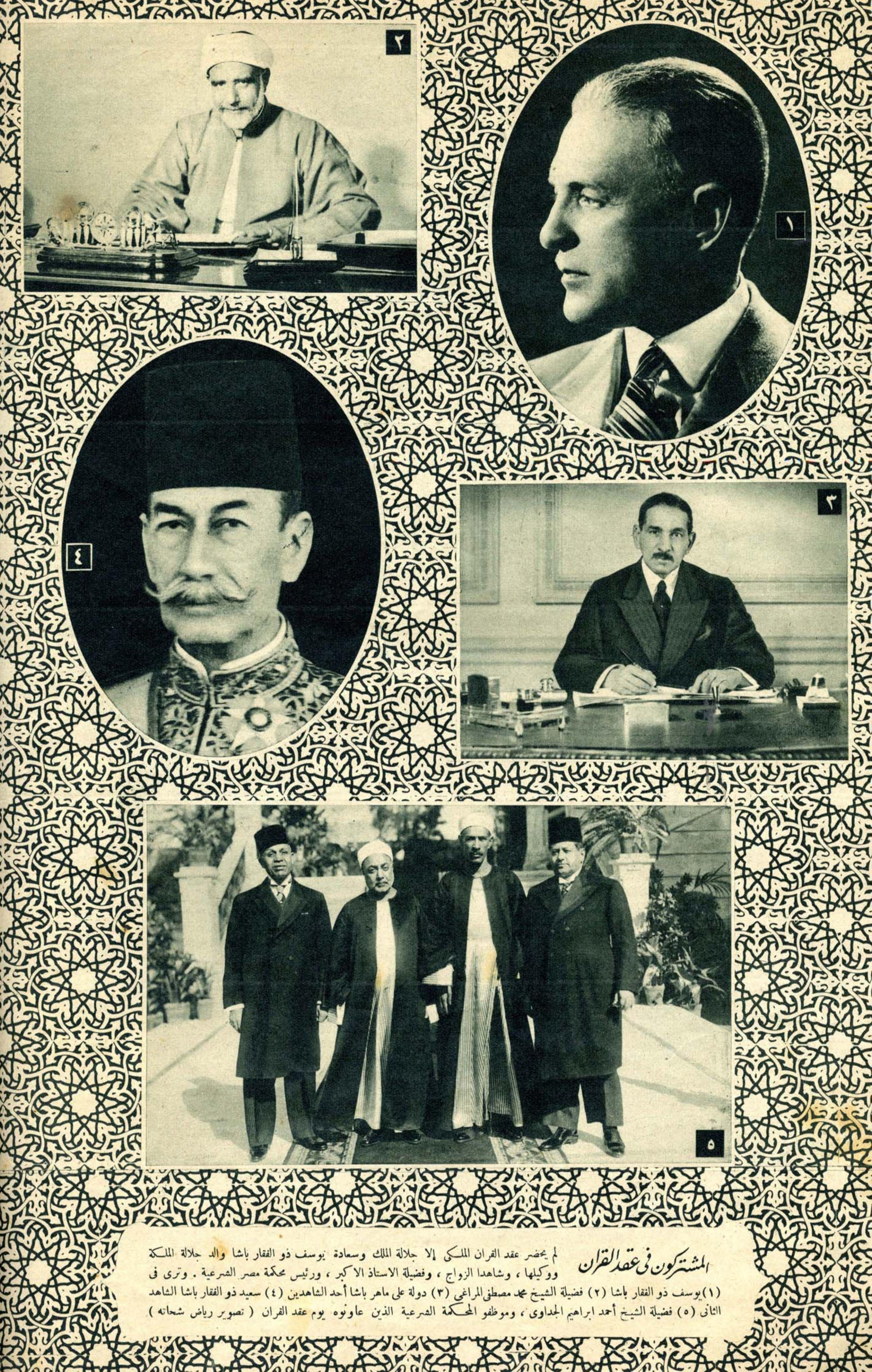
- Former editors: Amīnah al-Saʿīd; Hamdy Rizq; Makram Mohammed Ahmed; Abdul Qadir Shuheib; Fatema Sayed
- Categories: News magazine
- Frequency: Weekly
- Publisher: Dar Al Hilal Publishing House
- Founder: George Bey Zidan; Emil Zidan; Shukri Zidan
- Founded: 1925; 101 years ago
- First issue: 24 October 1924
- Country: Egypt
- Based in: Cairo
- Language: Arabic

Al-Musawar (Arabic: المصور; the Illustrated) is an Egyptian weekly current events magazine. The weekly is a state-owned publication, and its headquarters is in Cairo. It has been in circulation since 1925.

== History and profile ==
Al Musawar was launched as a weekly in 1925. The founder of the weekly was George Bey Zidan. Emil and Shukri Zidan are also the founders of the weekly which is published on Saturdays. The publisher is Dar Al Hilal Publishing House. On 17 December 1932 the magazine began to publish a sports supplement, Al Abtal (meaning Champions in English).

The weekly has been owned by the Egyptian government since 1960 and its editors-in-chief and head of the publishing house are appointed by the state. As of 2011 Al Musawar was cited as a liberal magazine.

One of its longest-serving editors was journalist Fekry Abaza. He held the post between 1926 and 1961 when he was fired due to his article published on 17 August 1961. Female writer Amīnah al-Saʿīd and Hamdy Rizq are among the former editors-in-chief of Al Musawar. Makram Mohammed Ahmed served as editor-in-chief of the weekly from the mid-1980s to 2005. Abdul Qadir Shuheib was appointed editor-in-chief in July 2005. On 28 June 2014 Fatema Sayed became the editor-in-chief of the magazine.

The weekly published interviews with major figures including one with Saudi King Faisal in August 1972 and several others with the former President Hosni Mubarak.

== See also ==
List of magazines in Egypt
