= Mabarrat Muhammad 'Ali =

Mabarrat Muhammad ῾Ali, the Muhammad ῾Ali Benevolent Society, is an Egyptian charitable women's organization established in Cairo in 1909.

The origins of the organization were in a health clinic established and financed by Princess Ayn-al-Hayat Rifaat at Abdeen, a poor Cairo neighbourhood. The Princess stipulated that the organization's president should always be a princess of the family, and that all committee members should be women. The society was codirected by two aristocratic women, the Muslim Hidaya Afifi Barakat (1899-1969) and the Christian Mary Kahil (1889-1979). It survived the 1952 Revolution, when many independent organizations were closed down. The society's hospitals were eventually nationalized in 1964, by which time they had treated around 13 million women.
