= Saiza Nabarawi =

Egyptian journalist

- Born: 1897; Elmenshawi Palace, Cairo, Egypt
- Died: 1985 (aged 87–88)
- Occupations: Feminist, Journalist
- Writing career
- Years active: 1925–1985

Saiza Nabarawi (Egyptian Arabic: سيزا النبراوى), also spelt as Siza Nabrawi or Ceza Nabarawi, (born Zainab Mohamed Mourad Nabarawi, Egyptian Arabic: زينب محمد مراد النبراوى), (1897–1985) was an Egyptian journalist educated in Paris, and who eventually became the leading journalist for the L'Egyptienne magazine.

== Early life ==
Nabarawi was originally born as Zainab Mohamed Mourad Nabrawi, into a family from Nabaruh in Egypt's Dakahlia governorate, and is a relative of the prominent Egyptian doctor Ibrahim Nabarawi. She was adopted by Adila Nabarawi, a distant relative, and was taken to Paris to be educated.

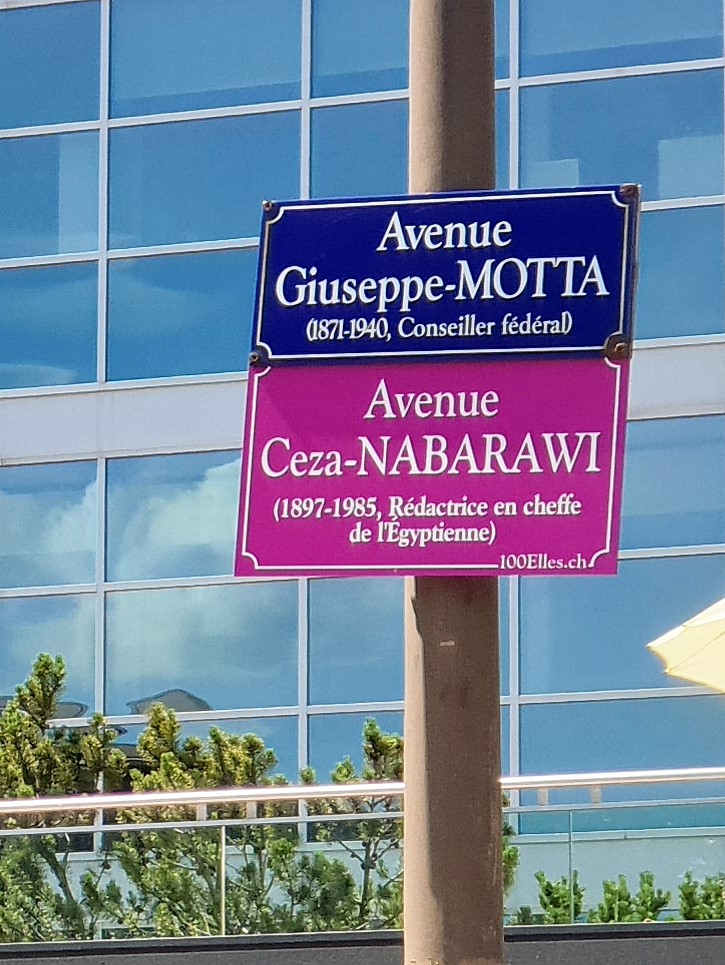
Temporary street sign named for Nabarawi, installed in Geneva in 2019.

She attended a convent school in Versailles and eventually studied at the Saint Germain des Pres Institute in Paris. She was sent back to Egypt but continued her education in a French school, Les Dames de Sion School in Alexandria. When her foster mother committed suicide, Nabarawi was claimed by Muhammad Murad and Fatma Hanim, her biological parents. She rejected them and lived with her maternal grandparents instead. Huda Shaarawi, a friend of her foster mother, eventually took an interest in Nabarawi during her early teens and helped her become a strong willed women's activist.

== Later life ==
A major act of defiance in Saiza Nabarawi's life occurred when she struggled against veils and headscarves which were imposed on many women. In 1923, on her return from the 9th Conference of the International Woman Suffrage Alliance in Rome, she and Sha'rawi removed their veils and headscarves at a public train station.

She also wrote about her exclusion from the third convocation of parliament in March 1925 in her article 'Double Standard'. In her piece she notes how she was not allowed admission into a parliament regarding Egypt's independence. She points out how wives of important officials were included in the audience, and not an editor of a successful newspaper. Her witty sarcasm and candor words made Nabarawi and excellent editor and feminist.

== Career ==
=== Egyptian Feminist Union ===
Nabarawi and Shaarawi were the founders of the Egyptian Feminist Union which called for the political rights for Egyptian women. It published the L'Egyptienne, the magazine of the EPU, which Nabarawi edited. She also founded the Women's Popular Resistance Committee. Nabarawi dedicated her life to feminist activism and attended international feminist conferences and spoke widely on the issues of gender equality.

On the 11th Conference of the International Woman Suffrage Alliance, she called for the need to arrange the First Eastern Women's Congress, a call answered by Nour Hamada, who arranged it in Damaskus in 1930. She was elected to the Executive Council of the Women's International Democratic Federation in 1953.

One of Nabarawi's mentors, Sa’d Zaghlul, regarded the fashioning of the veil in a way that was unorthodox to actual veiling. It was used more like a scarf designed to only cover the face. Her opinions describe the evolution from veil to no veil that Nabarawi took part in.
