= Qasim Amin =

Egyptian writer, judge and social reformer (1863–1908)

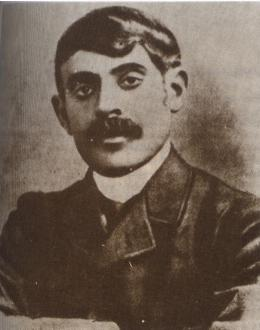
Qasim Amin.

Qasim Amin (pronounced [ˈʔæːsem ʔæˈmiːn], Egyptian Arabic: قاسم أمين; 1 December 1863 – 12 April 1908) was an Egyptian jurist, Islamic Modernist and one of the founders of the Egyptian national movement, as well as a co-founder of Cairo University. Qasim Amin was one of the Arab world's "first feminists" though his "feminism" has been the subject of scholarly controversy. His advocacy of greater rights for women catalyzed debate over women's issues in the Arab world. He criticized veiling, seclusion, early marriage, and lack of education of Muslim women.

Greatly influenced by the works of Darwin, Amin argued for the modernization of Egypt along European lines. He was also influenced by the works of Herbert Spencer and John Stuart Mill who argued for equality of the sexes. Amin believed that heightening women's status in society must greatly improve the nation. Amin blamed traditional Muslims for Egyptian women's oppression, saying that the Quran does not teach this subjugation but rather supports women's rights. His beliefs were often supported by Quranic verses.

== Early life ==
Amin was born to a Turkish father and an Arnaut mother from the family of Muhammad Ali. His father, Muhammad Amin Bey, served as governor of Diyarbekir Vilayet before moving the family to Alexandria where Amin was born. Qasim's father settled in Egypt and became the commander of Khedive Isma'il Pasha's army; he also held large feudal estates in both Alexandria and Diyarbekir. Qasim's mother was the daughter of Ahmad Bey Khattab, a son of Tahir Pasha, himself a nephew of Muhammad Ali Pasha. Qasim is recorded as a hereditary Bey, both paternally and maternally, in the 'Imperial and Asiatic quarterly review and oriental and colonial record.'

== Education ==
Amin attended primary school in Alexandria, and then in 1875 attended Cairo's Preparatory School. The curriculum at the school was said to be strict and heavily Europeanized. By 1881, at the age of seventeen, he received his law degree from the Khedival School and was one of 37 to receive a government scholarship to continue his education at France's University of Montpellier. His mission in France lasted four years.

- University of Montpellier 1881-1885
- Khedivial Law School
- Cairo preparatory school
- Alexandria palace school

== Marriage ==
In 1894, Amin married Zeyneb, the daughter of Admiral Amin Tafiq, and so he joined an Egyptian aristocratic family. His wife had been raised by a British nanny. Therefore, he felt it was necessary for his daughters to be raised by a British nanny as well. Amin's advocacy of resistance to women wearing the niqab was said to have perpetuated within his own family. Although he could not dissuade his wife from wearing it, his plan was to teach the younger generation of females, like his daughter, that they should not wear it.

== Career ==
=== Background ===
In 1879, a nationalist upraising led by Egyptian army officer Colonel Ahmed Urabi threatened to depose the reigning khedive, Tewfik Pasha. In 1882, the British Empire intervened in support of Tewfik (the Anglo-Egyptian War), ending the Urabi revolt. Nominally, the Khedivate of Egypt remained an autonomous province of the Ottoman Empire, but de facto the country became a British protectorate. Egypt would remain under British occupation for the next 40 years, until the Unilateral Declaration of Egyptian Independence in 1922.

=== Amin's judicial career ===
After his education in France, Amin became a part of the British Empire's civil servant class and, in 1885, he was appointed a jurist in the Mixed Courts of Egypt, which had been created ten years earlier. These courts had western influence as they were based partly on the Napoleonic judicial system as well as on Islamic law. The jurists tended to be from England, Austria, Germany, or France. Amin had a successful tenure. The court's governmental tribunal often competed with the religious courts in its decision making, and it was noted for its true reflection of the "right way" because it based its judgments on valid and sound reasoning. By 1887, Amin had entered the predominately western-run Egyptian office of the Government Division of Legal Affairs. Within four years, he was selected as one of the National Court's Egyptian judges. He was also the Chancellor of the Cairo National Court of Appeals.

Amin was one of the founders of Cairo University, known then as the National University, and was a member of its constituent committee. He insisted that Egypt needed a Western-style university. He was appointed as the university's first secretary-general, and also its Vice-President.

== Influence of the Nahda (Awakening) ==
Amin became a central figure of the Nahda movement that achieved prominence in Egypt during a period of "feminist consciousness" in the latter part of the nineteenth century. He agreed with his mentor, the exiled Muhammad Abduh, in blaming Islamic traditionalists for the moral and intellectual decay of Islam which, they believed, had caused its colonisation by western forces. Egypt, at the time, was a colony of the British Empire and partly of France.

Abduh called for all Muslims to unite, to recognise the true message sent by Allah which gave women equal status, and to resist Western imperialism. Amin accepted Abduh's philosophies as he too believed the traditionalists had created an inferior society by not following true Islamic laws. Like Abduh, Amin advocated the right of females in society, and rejected the cultural values that kept Egyptian women in submission.

In his book The Liberation of Women (1899), Amin argued for the abolition of the veil. He thought that changing customs regarding women and changing their costume, abolishing the veil in particular, were key to bringing about the desired general social transformation. To answer the conservatives who argued that abolition of the veil would have an influence on women's purity, Amin replied not from the perspective of gender equality but from the standpoint of following the superior Western civilization. He wrote: "Do Egyptians imagine that the men of Europe, who have attained such completeness of intellect and feeling that they were able to discover the force of steam and electricity...these souls that daily risk their lives in the pursuit of knowledge and honour above the pleasure of life, ... these intellects and these souls that we so admire, could possibly fail to know the means of safeguarding woman and preserving her purity? Do they think that such a people would have abandoned veiling after it had been in use among them if they had seen any good in it?"

Some contemporary feminist scholars, notably Leila Ahmed, have challenged Amin's status as the supposed "father of Egyptian feminism". Ahmed points out that in the gender-segregated society of the time, Amin could have had very little contact with Egyptian women other than immediate family, servants, and possibly prostitutes. His portrait of Egyptian women as backward, ignorant, and lagging behind their European "sisters" was therefore based on very limited evidence. Ahmed also concludes that through his rigorous critique and generalizations of women in Egypt along with his zealous praise of European society and colonialism, Amin, in effect, promoted the substitution of Egyptian androcentrism with Western androcentrism, not feminism.

Although he saw women as inferior to men, Amin supported the legislation of divorce. According to tradition, divorce is valid if the husband verbally announces it three times. Amin thought such oral agreement was not serious enough and that the lack of legality in the process contributed to the high rate of divorce in Cairo. Many men, he argued, accidentally divorced from their wives through jokes or quarrels.

== Books by Qasim Amin ==
- 1894: "Les Égyptiens : réponse à M. le duc d'Harcourt" was written as a response to Duke d'Harcourt's criticism of Egyptian life and women. Amin did not defend Egyptian women in his rebuttal, but he did defend Islam's treatment of women.
- 1899: "Tahrir al- Mar'a (The Liberation of Women)". Dissatisfied with his rebuttal, Amin called for the education of women only to primary level. He maintained his belief in patriarchal domination over women, yet advocated modification of legislation pertaining to divorce, polygamy, and abolition of the veil. The book was co-written with Muhammad Abduh and Ahmad Lufti al-Sayid. It used many Quranic verses to support his belief.
- 1900: "al-Mar'a al-Jadida (The New Woman)". In this book, Amin envisioned 'the new woman' emerging in Egypt whose conduct and actions were modelled on the Western woman. The book was considered more liberal in nature, but he used social Darwinism as his argument. He states: "A woman may be given in marriage to a man she does not know who forbids her the right to leave him and forces her to this or that and then throws her out as he wishes: this is slavery indeed".

== Intellectual contribution ==
An advocate for social reform in his native country of Egypt, during the latter part of the 19th century when it was a colony under the British Empire, Amin called for the establishment of nuclear families similar to those in France, where he saw women not placed under the same patriarchy culture that subjugated Egyptian women. Amin believed that Egyptian women were denied their Quranic rights to handle their own business affairs and marry and divorce freely. He refuted polygamy saying it "implied an intense contempt of women," and that marriage should be a mutual agreement. He opposed the Egyptian custom of "veiling" the woman, saying it was the major pronunciation of woman's oppression. The niqab, Amin said, made it impossible to identify women. To him, when they walked with their niqab and long dresses, it made them more noticeable to men and more distrusted. Furthermore, he exclaimed that men in the West treated women with more dignity allowing them to go to school, walk without a veil, and speak their mind. This freedom, he insisted "contributed significantly" to the foundation of knowledge in the nation. He supported the idea that educated women brought forward educated children. When women were enslaved in the home, without a voice and without an education, they tended to spend their time wastefully and bring forth children that would grow to be lazy, ignorant, and mistrustful. Once educated, these women could become better mothers and wives by learning to manage their homes better. Amin gave an example of the situation. He said "Our present situation resembles that of a very wealthy man who locks up his gold in a chest. This man," he said "unlocks his chest daily for the mere pleasure of see his chest. If he knew better, he could invest his gold and double his wealth in a short time." Therefore, it was important to the Egyptian nation that women's roles should be changed. Although, he maintained his view that Egypt remain a patriarchal society, its women should remove the veil and be given a primary education. This he believed was a stepping stone to a stronger Egyptian nation that which was free of English colonialism.

== Controversy ==
Critics of Amin's philosophies point out that Amin had no association with women other than aristocratic women or prostitutes and they therefore question his stance of condemning all Egyptian women. Furthermore, Leila Ahmed, a novelist and reformer, suggests in her book Women and Gender in Islam that Amin's attempt to discredit the veil as a reason for Egyptian weakness is clearly a Western view. She illustrates how Westerners tend to use the veil as a reason to colonize Islamic nations by correlating the veil with inferiority. In addition, Ahmed points out that Amin's Egyptian woman, would not have control over her own body but instead it would be used to build up the nation. To her, this is hypocrisy because the Egyptian woman would still be the slave of her husband, her family, and her nation. In addition, history professor, Mona Russell further challenges Amin's description of the new woman saying that it was "one of the fruits of modern society." She argues that she is not "new", does not care to be "synonymous" with the Western woman, and is her own being. Amin, they believe, was influenced by his foreign education and upper middle class position which looked to foreign colonialism as superior rule. It was his way of integrating into foreign colonialism that held power of Egypt. His quote in which he says "We today enjoy a justice and a freedom the like of which I do not think Egypt has ever witnessed at anytime in the past" is seen as proof of this admiration.

== See also ==
- Mustafa Sabri
- Islamic feminism
- Women and Islam
- List of women's rights activists
- Hoda Shaarawi
- Nawal el-Saadawi
- Leila Ahmed

== External link ==
- Works by or about Qasim Amin at the Internet Archive
