= Hawaa =

Weekly women's magazine in Egypt

- Categories: Women's magazine
- Frequency: Weekly
- Publisher: Dar Al Hilal
- First issue: 1954; 71 years ago
- Country: Egypt
- Based in: Cairo
- Language: Arabic
- Website: Hawaa

Hawaa (Arabic: Eve) is a weekly women's magazines published in Cairo, Egypt. The magazine is modelled by other women's magazines in the Arab countries. It was Egypt's first women's magazine, founded in 1954.

== History and profile ==
Hawaa was first published in 1954. The founder was Amina Al Said, an Egyptian journalist and feminist. The publisher is Dar Al Hilal.

Hawaa is published weekly and features news on health and beauty, family affairs, fashion, adornment and home management using a feminist perspective. In the 1970s it featured short stories written by both Egyptian and Western authors. The magazine targets not only women but also men.

Amina Al Said, its founder, was the first editor-in-chief of the weekly and served in the post from its inception in 1954 to 1969. She was the first female editor-in-chief and the first female chair of a publishing house, namely, Dar Al Hilal, in Egypt. She published a weekly column in Hawaa until her death in 1995.

Iqbal Baraka was the long-term editor-in-chief of the magazine who was appointed to the post in July 1993. On 28 June 2014 Magda Mahmoud became the editor-in-chief of the magazine.

Egyptian intellectual Latifa al-Zayyat was the contributor of Hawaa from 1965 to 1968.

== Circulation ==
Hawaa sold 175,000 copies in 1954. Its circulation was 200,000 copies before 1967 and was about 175,000 copies in the period between 1967 and 1970. The circulation of the magazine in 2000 was 150,000 copies.

The magazine also enjoyed high circulation levels abroad and had the largest foreign circulation in 1989.

== See also ==
- List of magazines in Egypt
