= Egyptian Feminist Union =

NGO founded in 1923

The Egyptian Feminist Union (Arabic: الاتحاد النسائي المصري) was the first nationwide feminist movement in Egypt.

== History and profile ==
The Egyptian Feminist Union was founded at a meeting on 6 March 1923 at the home of activist Huda Sha'arawi, who served as its first president until her death on December 12, 1947. Before becoming the EFU, the organization which had ties to the Wafd Party was called the Wafdist Women's Central Committee in 1920. The creation of the Egyptian Feminist Union came in response to feminist dissatisfaction with the Egyptian independence movement, which placed women's rights as secondary in the struggle for independence.

Its mission was to gain comprehensive rights for women. Some of the demands of the EFU were but are not limited to: women's suffrage, the advancement of women and children's education, stopping government legalized prostitution, reforming the personal status law, as well as better healthcare for women and children. These demands were chronicled and published in their fortnightly periodical L'Egyptienne from 1925, and from 1937 the journal al-Misriyyah (The Egyptian Woman). They would eventually become successful in the struggle for women's suffrage, with Egypt granting the right to vote to women in 1956, as well as ending legalized prostitution. Demands for education reforms by the union were met in 1925 when the government made primary education compulsory for girls as well as boys, and later in the decade women were admitted to the national university for the first time.

The union's campaign for the reform of family law, however, was unsuccessful. The EFU was not able to reform parts of the family law and Personal Status Codes that allowed males to divorce their spouses without the spouses' consent, as well as ending polygamy.

The EFU also supported complete independence from the United Kingdom, but like upper-class male leaders of the Wafd Party, promoted European social values and had an essentially secular orientation.

The organization was affiliated to the International Woman Suffrage Alliance. In 1923 the International Woman Suffrage Alliance held a meeting in the capital of Italy which the EFU sent delegates to attend.

The union organized the Eastern Women's Conference for the Defense of Palestine in Cairo, and Huda Sharawi suggested the individual countries establish feminist unions, and that those unions form an umbrella organization, spanning the Arab world. In December 1944, the EFU convened the Arab Women's Congress or Arab Women's Conference in Cairo, which formally established the Arab Feminist Union (AFU).

Upon Huda Sha'arawi's death in 1947, Doria Shafik looked as though she would become her natural successor as the leader of the EFU, but instead formed the Bint Al-Nil Union a year later in 1948 to further the aims of the women's rights movement in Egypt - with a particular focus on social progress and inclusion in policymaking. In February 1951, Shafik managed to secretly bring together 1500 women from Egypt's two leading feminist groupings (the EFU and Bint Al-Nil Union). She organized a march that interrupted parliament for four hours after they gathered there with a series of demands mainly related to women's socioeconomic rights. Mufidah Abdul Rahman was chosen to defend Shafik in court in regards to this. When the case went to trial, many Bint al-Nil supporters attended the courtroom, and the judge adjourned the hearing indefinitely. However, in spite of receiving promises from the President of the Senate, women's rights experienced no improvements.

=== Egyptian Feminist Union Under Nasser ===
Under the first years of Gamal Abdel Nasser's presidency, the EFU had their demands met by being granted the right to vote (1956). Nasser also created equal opportunity for women in education and employment, while promising middle and lower class citizens the right to education, healthcare, and economic mobility for both men and women. The Egyptian Feminist Union became restricted under the government controlled by President Gamal Abdel Nasser during and after 1956. The Nasser regime would go on to dissolve The EFU in 1956 and absorb the organization, going from an independent organization to a government-run charity renamed the Huda Sha'arawi Association. The Nasser regime passed the Law 32/1964 which gave the government the ability to regulate or simply ban organizations that were not already associated under the government. This made it difficult for the organization to demand political and economic rights.

=== Egyptian Feminist Union Since 2011 ===
Since 2011, the EFU reformed as a non-profit, non-governmental organization under the original name but with a different goal and team. This was sparked largely due to the 2011 Egyptian Revolution during which many feminist activism groups formed alliances and played a large role in a number of demonstrations and sit-ins against Hosni Mubarak and the Egyptian government. Today, among other objectives, the EFU as a non-profit aims to raise awareness of women's issues, conduct research, as well as integrating technology such as databases to work towards solving these issues.

== Notable members ==
Nabawiyya Musa

=== Nabawiyya Musa ===
Nabawiyya Mohamed Musa Badawi (1886–1951) was a pioneering figure of women's education in Egypt and was a founding member of the Egyptian Feminist Union. Born in the town of Zagazig, Musa received home education and became the first woman to finish high school in Egypt after passing the state baccalaureate exam in 1907 before being accepted into the Saniyya School - Egypt's first teacher-training specific school for women. After receiving her formal education, Musa continued on her trailblazing path by becoming the first female school principal, a position she held from 1924 to 1926. She later went on to be appointed to work for the Department of Education to take up the position of the chief inspector of women's education.

As a strong advocate for women's rights to work and education, Musa attended the International Woman Suffrage Alliance conference of 1923 in Rome and delivered a speech that called for ensuring girls' rights to education. She famously returned from Rome unveiled alongside Huda Sha'arawi and Saiza Nabarawi. Most of Musa's works as an academic and activist come from her writings, with her most influential being Woman and Work, in which she argued for women's right to work and strongly dismissed the largely longstanding belief of female biological inferiority in order to work in occupations other than teaching or midwifery.

=== Amīnah al-Saʿīd ===
Amīnah al-Saʿīd (1914-1995) was an Egyptian journalist, scholar and feminist who played a leading role in the Egyptian Feminist Union. Born in Asyut, Saʿīd was resistant to wearing the veil from a young age while attending Shubra Secondary School. It was also during this time that Saʿīd joined the youth wing of the EFU as a teenager. She then went on to receive a degree in English literature from Cairo University in 1935, being among the first cohort of women receiving admission into the university. Saʿīd's position in the EFU was as the editor for the Arabic-written version of L'Egyptienne journal al-Misriyyah, and later became editor for the EFU's second journal Hawaa (Eve) from 1954 to 1969 which sold successfully in domestically and across the Arab countries. Throughout her career, Saʿīd's opposition to Egypt's veiling traditions and to its personal status laws were unwavering, which resulted in her facing intimidation from Islamic fundamentalists. Saʿīd's career in the journalism industry spanned until her eventual retirement in 1984, in which she held the position of chairperson of Dar al-Hilal, Egypt's oldest publishing house.

=== Saiza Nabarawi ===
Saiza Nabarawi (1897-1985) was an Egyptian journalist, nationalist and founding member of the Egyptian Feminist Union. Nabarawi was initially raised by a distant relative in Paris but would later continue her studies at Les Dames de Sion, a private French school in Alexandria. She would later leave for Cairo as a teenager to live with a different relative where she would meet Huda Sha'arawi, who was a friend of Nabarawi's deceased foster mother. Sha'arawi took Nabarawi under her wing as a mentee and gave her the position of editor for EFU's French journal, L'Egyptienne, in February 1925. Through its monthly publications, Nabarawi oversaw the various writings that highlighted both the struggle for women's rights and national independence in colonial Egypt until its final publication in 1940, when Egypt became involved in World War II. She also helped to develop and further the aims of the EFU by lecturing and writing extensively on topics regarding veiling and female liberation. In 1951, Nabarawi founded the Women's Popular Resistance Committee, as she continued to dedicate her life to feminist activism.

== See also ==
- Feminism in Egypt
- List of women's rights organizations
