= Huda Sha'arawi =

Egyptian feminist leader (1879–1947)

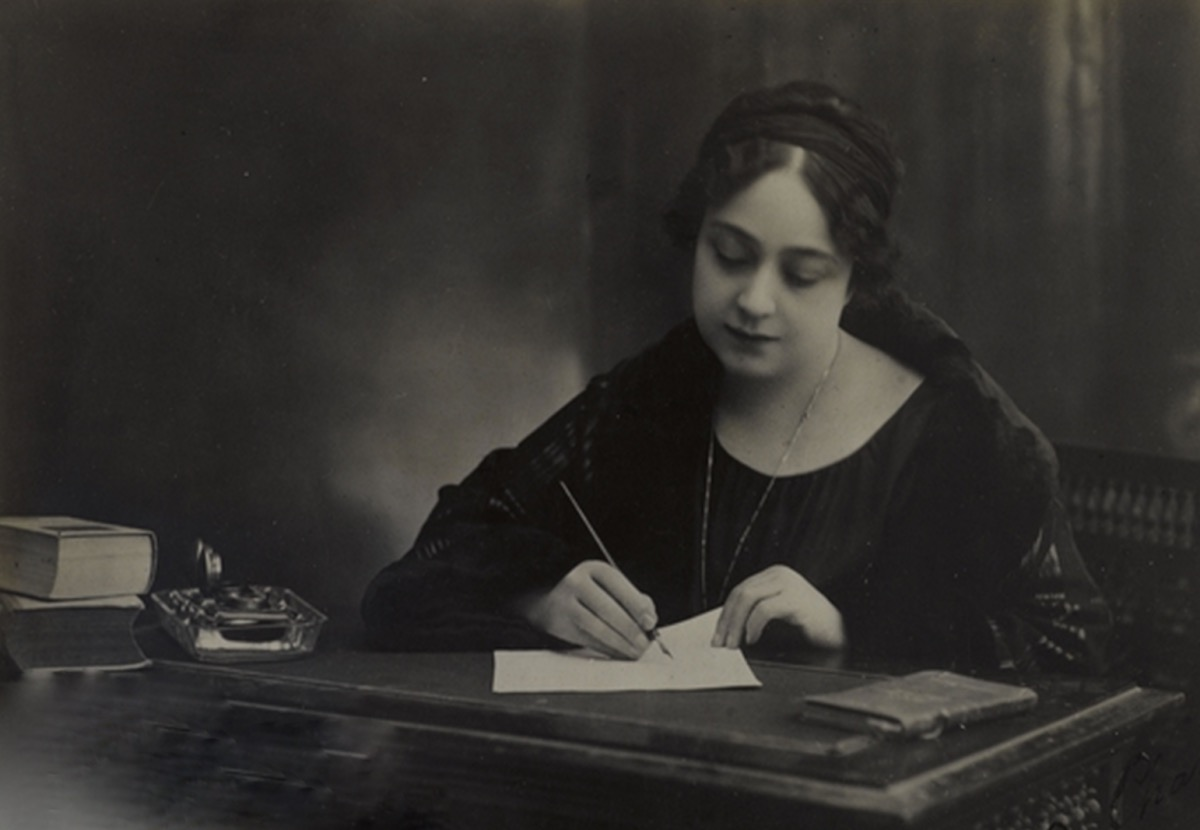
Huda Sha'rawi in her office, not wearing hijab

Huda Sha'arawi or Hoda Sha'rawi (Arabic: هدى شعراوي, ALA-LC: Hudá Sha‘rāwī; 23 June 1879 – 12 December 1947) was a pioneering Egyptian feminist leader, suffragette, nationalist, and founder of the Egyptian Feminist Union.

== Early life and marriage ==
Huda Sha'arawi was born Nour Al-Huda Mohamed Sultan Shaarawi (Arabic: نور الهدى محمد سلطان شعراوي) in the Upper Egyptian city of Minya to the famous Egyptian Shaarawi family. She was the daughter of Muhamed Sultan Pasha Shaarawi, who later became president of Egypt's Chamber of Deputies. Her mother, Iqbal Hanim, was of Circassian descent and was sent from the Caucasus region to live with her uncle in Egypt. Sha'arawi was educated at an early age along with her brothers, studying various subjects such as grammar and calligraphy in multiple languages. She spent her childhood and early adulthood secluded in an upper-class Egyptian community. After her father's death, she was under the guardianship of her eldest cousin, Ali Sha'arawi.

At the age of thirteen, she was married to her cousin Ali Sha'arawi, who Sultan named as the legal guardian of his children and trustee of his estate. According to Middle Eastern scholar Margot Badran, a "subsequent separation from her husband gave her time for an extended formal education, as well as an unexpected taste of independence." She was taught and received tutoring by female teachers in Cairo. Sha'arawi wrote poetry in both Arabic and French. Sha'arawi later recounted her early life in her memoir, Modhakkerātī (مذكرتي, “My Memoir") which was first published in English translation as Harem Years: The Memoirs of an Egyptian Feminist, 1879–1924.

== Nationalism ==
The Egyptian Revolution of 1919 was a women-led protest advocating for Egyptian independence from Britain and the release of male nationalist leaders. Members of the female Egyptian elite, such as Sha'arawi, led the masses of protestors while lower-class women and women from the countryside provided assistance to and participated in street protests alongside male activists. Sha'arawi worked with her husband during the revolution while he stood as acting vice president for the Wafd; Pasha Sha'arawi kept her informed so she could take his place if he or other members of Wafd were arrested. The Wafdist Women's Central Committee (WWCC), associated with Wafd, was founded on 12 January 1920, following the protests in 1919. Many of the women who participated in the protests became members of the committee, electing Sha'arawi as its first president.

In 1938, Sha'arawi and the EFU sponsored the Eastern Women's Conference for the Defense of Palestine in Cairo.

In 1945 she received the Order of Virtues.

== Feminism ==
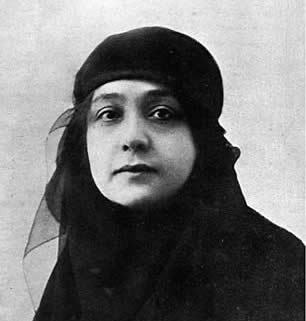
Huda Sha'rawi before removing her mantle

At the time, women in Egypt were confined to the house or harem which she viewed as a very backward system. Sha'arawi resented such restrictions on women's movements, and consequently started organizing lectures for women on topics of interest to them. This brought many women out of their homes and into public places for the first time, and Sha'arawi was able to convince them to help her establish a women's welfare society to raise money for the poor women of Egypt. In 1910, Sha'arawi opened a school for girls where she focused on teaching academic subjects rather than practical skills such as midwifery.

Sha'arawi made a decision to stop wearing her traditional hijab after her husband's death in 1922. After returning from the 9th Conference of the International Woman Suffrage Alliance Congress in Rome, she removed her veil and mantle, a landmark event in the history of Egyptian feminism. Women who came to greet her were shocked at first, then broke into applause, and some of them removed their veils and mantles.

Within a decade of Sha'arawi’s act of defiance, many Egyptian women stopped wearing veils and mantles for many decades until a retrograde movement occurred. Her decision to remove her veil and mantle was part of a greater movement of women, and was influenced by French-born Egyptian feminist Eugénie Le Brun, but it contrasted with some feminist thinkers like Malak Hifni Nasif. In 1923, Sha'arawi founded and became the first president of the Egyptian Feminist Union. Characteristic of liberal feminism in the early twentieth century, the EFU sought to reform laws restricting personal freedoms, such as marriage, divorce, and child custody.

Even as a young woman, she showed her independence by entering a department store in Alexandria to buy her own clothes instead of having them brought to her home. She helped to organize Mubarrat Muhammad Ali, a women's social service organization, in 1909 and the Intellectual Association of Egyptian Women in 1914, the year in which she traveled to Europe for the first time. She helped lead the first women's street demonstration during the Egyptian Revolution of 1919, and was elected president of the Wafdist Women's Central Committee. She began to hold regular meetings for women at her home, and from this, the Egyptian Feminist Union was born. She launched a fortnightly feminist journal in French called L'Égyptienne in 1925, and then started publishing it in Arabic in 1937 under the name "المصريـة" (al-miṣriyya), in order to publicize the cause; both titles mean "the female Egyptian".

She led Egyptian women's pickets at the opening of Parliament in January 1924 and submitted a list of nationalist and feminist demands, which were ignored by the Wafdist government, whereupon she resigned from the Wafdist Women's Central Committee. She continued to lead the Egyptian Feminist Union until her death, publishing the feminist magazine l'Egyptienne (and el-Masreyya), and representing Egypt at women's congresses in Graz, Paris, Amsterdam, Berlin, Marseille, Istanbul, Brussels, Budapest, Copenhagen, Interlaken, and Geneva. She advocated peace and disarmament. Even if only some of her demands were met during her lifetime, she laid the groundwork for later gains by Egyptian women and remains the symbolic standard-bearer for their liberation movement. Claims that she continued to wear an apostolnik are false; images of her continuing to wear a mantle are fabricated.This is proven by actual videos and photos, and by the fact that no women were still wearing mantles at her time.

== Meeting with Atatürk ==
The Twelfth International Women Conference was held in Istanbul, Turkey on 18 April 1935, and Huda Sha'arawi was the president and member of twelve women. The conference elected Huda as the vice-president of the International Women’s Union and considered Atatürk as a role model for her and his actions.

She wrote in her memoirs: "After the Istanbul conference ended, we received an invitation to attend the celebration held by Mustafa Kemal Atatürk, the liberator of modern Turkey. In the salon next to his office, the invited delegates stood in the form of a semicircle, and after a few moments the door opened and entered Atatürk surrounded by an aura of majesty and greatness, and a feeling of prestige prevailed. Honorable, when my turn came, I spoke directly to him without translation, and the scene was unique for an oriental woman standing for the International Women’s Authority and giving a speech in the Turkish language expressing admiration and thanks to the Egyptian women for the liberation movement that he led in Turkey, and I said: This is the ideal of leaving Oh the elder sister of the Islamic countries, he encouraged all the countries of the East to try to liberate and demand the rights of women, and I said: If the Turks considered you the worthiness of their father and they called you Atatürk, I say that this is not enough, but you are for us “Atasharq” [Father of the East]. Its meaning did not come from any female head of delegation, and thanked me very much for the great influence, and then I begged him to present us with a picture of his Excellency for publication in the journal L'Égyptienne."

== Philanthropy ==
Sha'arawi was involved in philanthropic projects throughout her life. In 1909, she created the first philanthropic society run by Egyptian women (Mabarrat Muhammad 'Ali), offering social services for poor women and children. She argued that women-run social service projects were important for two reasons. First, by engaging in such projects, women would widen their horizons, acquire practical knowledge and direct their focus outward. Second, such projects would challenge the view that all women are creatures of pleasure and beings in need of protection. To Sha'arawi, problems of the poor were to be resolved through charitable activities of the rich, particularly through donations to education programs. Holding a somewhat romanticized view of poor women's lives, she viewed them as passive recipients of social services, not to be consulted about priorities or goals. The rich, in turn, were the "guardians and protectors of the nation."

== In books and popular culture ==
Sania Sharawi Lanfranchi published a biography of her grandmother, Casting Off the Veil, in 2012.

Sha'arawi is depicted in the song "The Lioness" by English singer-songwriter Frank Turner on his 2019 album No Man's Land.

On 23 June 2020, Google celebrated her 141st birthday with a Google Doodle.

== See also ==
- Women's literary salons and societies in the Arab world
- List of women's rights activists
- Timeline of first women's suffrage in majority-Muslim countries
- Timeline of women's legal rights (other than voting)
- Timeline of women's suffrage
