= Feminism in Egypt =

Feminism in Egypt has involved a number of social and political groups throughout its history. Although Egypt has in many respects been a forerunner in matters of reform particularly "in developing movements of nationalism, of resistance to imperialism and of feminism," its development in fighting for equality for women and their rights has not been easy.

== Position of women in Egyptian history ==
In early Egyptian history (see Ancient Egypt), women's position in Egyptian society is believed to have been equal to that of men. For example, female gods played a vital role in ancient Egyptian religion, roles which can be identified as being of equal importance to that of male gods. Goddesses such as Mut, Isis and Hathor ruled over and controlled many areas of human activity. It is believed by many scholars that the high status of such goddesses is indicative of the high status of women in Pharaonic society. Equal status can be further illustrated by the very fact that Egypt was ruled by queens – female pharaohs such as Sobekneferu, Hatshepsut and Cleopatra VII, regents such as Meritneith or Ahmose-Nefertari or holders of the prestigious title God's Wife of Amun during the Late Period. Since their position was largely hereditary, women of commoner background such as the physician Peseshet, the vizier Nebet, or the scribe Irtyrau are better examples of women's position in Egypt. Examples of early Egyptian artwork are also important in identifying the potentially revered position held by women in Ancient Egypt. Paintings of the earlier eras show men and women as being of equal size. Kumari Jeyawordena claims that it is only after "2000 BC that women are often depicted somewhat smaller than males probably indicating a diminution of their status".

=== Western rule ===
Foreign control of Egypt was the status quo of the country's leadership for many centuries. Control of the country has ranged from early Roman domination, to the country becoming an Arab conquest in the 7th century, and then in the 16th century becoming part of the Turkish Ottoman Empire (see History of Egypt, Egypt). However, it was the French invasion of Egypt that began to change the position of women in Egyptian society and that influenced the beginnings of social change in the country.

The French Invasion of Egypt led by Napoleon Bonaparte in 1798 was to have significant social implications for the country. The French invasion "caused a rapid flow of European ideas into Egypt including the ideology of the French Revolution". Marriages took place between French officers and Egyptian women. There were also "cases of Egyptian women imitating the behavior and dress of the women of the expedition". Such ideas and beliefs were not however welcomed by all in Egypt. As a result, a backlash emerged against such Western ideas. The historian al Jabarti reportedly commented on the "pernicious innovations and corruption of women caused by the French occupation".

Following a series of civil wars, Egypt saw the end of French rule. Albanian General Muhammad Ali (see Muhammad Ali's seizure of power) established authority in Egypt in 1805 and was appointed as Ottoman viceroy. During his time in power, a series of modernization reforms were introduced in Egypt. Reforms included updating public works and improving the industrialization of Egypt and importantly included a series of reforms within education. Although he generally regarded "education as a means of fitting young men for the public service", advancements were also made in the education of women. Daughters of the upper classes in Egypt of the time were able to receive education at home, however, poorer girls were able to attend Kuttabs where the Qur'an was taught along with some reading and writing. In 1832 Muhammad Ali went on to build a school at which girls and women were taught to be midwives. Further improvements to women's position within Egyptian society were introduced by Isma'il Pasha known as Ismail the Magnificent (December 31, 1830 – March 2, 1895), Muhammad Ali's successor. In 1873, his third wife, Jashem Afet Hanum, started the Suyliyya Girls School which provided teaching to girls of a variety of subjects ranging from history and religion to arithmetic. Female education did however remain restrictive. According to Abdel Kadar, "the purpose was restricted to preparing girls to be efficient mothers and good wives, and it was mainly the girls of bourgeois families who benefited".

Despite both social and economic reforms and further improvements made by Isma'il Pasha, Egypt had fallen heavily into debt to European powers and to protect its financial interests, particularly those in the Suez Canal, the UK seized control of the Egyptian government (1882).

Opposition against foreign intervention, particularly against the British occupation of Egypt began to grow. A reaction against Western influence and social and economic dissatisfaction led to the emergence of the Nationalist movement. Reformism and therefore feminism, which were originally closely linked, began to diverge.

Omar Lotfy, an Egyptian lawyer and intellectual, also addressed women's rights in his 1897 work Haqq al-Mar'a (Women's Rights), contributing to the early intellectual discussions surrounding the position of women in Egyptian society.

== Nationalism ==
The start of the 20th century saw a growing national consciousness. "The overwhelming presence of Europe and the collapse of much of the traditional order led to a reconsideration of Egypt's position and identity to the West. National independence seemed to supply the answer to western domination". A growing dissatisfaction with Egyptian society began to emerge and with it came calls for reform. The improvement of the position of women was part of this reform. "Since the end of the nineteenth century, Egyptian Nationalists have claimed that there can be no improvement of the state without improving the position of women."

Saad Zaghlul and the Wafd Party led the Egyptian nationalist movement. The Wafd was the first organised mass party in Egypt. Although Zaghlul and the Wafd gained a majority in the Legislative Assembly, this did not stop the British government from exiling Zaghlul and some of his fellow part members to Malta on March 8, 1919. This proved to be the final straw for many and in protest Egyptian society rose to demonstrate against the British in what was the country's first modern Revolution.

=== 1919 Revolution ===
Western repression along with the exile of the popular Wafd leader Saad Zaghlul proved to be the catalyst for change resulting in violent demonstrations. All classes of Egyptian society participated and it was the first time women were involved in such rallies. In fact "open political agitation and action on the part of women began with their participation in the Nationalist movement against the British". The first women's specific march against the occupation happened on March 16, 1919, and was principally organised by Huda Sha'arawi, around 300 Egyptian women attended.

"The veiled gentlewomen of Cairo paraded in the streets shouting slogans for independence and freedom from foreign occupation. They organised strikes and demonstrations, boycotts of British goods and wrote petitions protesting British actions in Egypt". These demonstrations are believed to be what led to the emergence of the first phase of Egyptian feminism.

== Feminist publications ==
Zaynab Fawwaz, both a journalist and writer, is considered the first women to write autobiographical works in Egypt, publishing "الدر المنثور في طبقات ربات الخدور", (The Book of Scattered Pearls Regarding Categories of Women, 1894–95) which contained the lives of 456 women and their achievements. Fawwaz wrote in order to provide examples of the strength of women and celebrate their achievements. These autobiographies were later widely published in the Egyptian Press.

Egyptian press and periodicals, including women's press, grew during a period of nationalist movements in Egypt, it was a key way to debate political issues. Women's press was less censored than the mainstream patriarchal press, as British occupying forces saw it as less of a threat to power. The period before the creation of political parties in Egypt in 1907 is characterised as a key journalistic phase for nationalism and also for feminism, with an increase in female readership too. Hind Nawfal's publication al- Fatat was first published in 1892 in Alexandria. Nawfal stated that this was a periodical for and about women, in which she aimed to defend women's rights, express her views and discuss their duties. After Nawfal's journal, more feminist press was created at a rate of one per year through the first world war.

Other examples of feminist press are the Coptic journal set up by Malaka Sa-d al-jins al-lateef (1908-1925) which discussed Coptic women's concerns as well as publishing a diverse set of female editors. As well as the Muslim women's journal Tarqiyat al-Mar’a, also published in 1908 the journal argued for the implementation of women's rights which were granted by Islam, as well as arguing for gender segregation and veiling.

Although originally inspired by western European and Turkish women's press, these feminist journals began to take on their own style. A women did not feature on the cover until the 1920s, with drawings previously being preferred due to conventions on veiling. During this time, men started writing women's periodicals too as it became an accepted literary genre, these often came in a tabloid form.

May Ziadeh, Lebanese-Palestinian feminist and author also published a large selection of feminist autobiographies, her works are considered by many as integral to the Arab feminist movement. During the period of 1919–1925, Ziadeh published many autobiographies of women as part of her advocacy for the emancipation of women, including of Egyptian feminist Malak Hifni Nassef in her book Bahithat-ul-Badia.

== Egyptian Feminist Union ==
There was two phases of the feminist movement. The first is considered to have happened between the end of the 19th century and 1919, this was a period of increasing nationalist consciousness and social nationalism. This phase was more invisible to the public in comparison to later phases as women were not yet moving in the public domain and revolved around middle and upper-middle-class women. The second phase is considered to have been between 1919 and 1923, when women slowly came into the public domain and engaged in political, social and economic activism. For example, in 1922 the women's movement organised their first boycott of British goods and services, women played a significant role in upholding this as principal buyers and household managers. They also urged Egyptians to withdraw money from British banks and instead invest in the new National bank. The next phase of the feminist movement is considered to have taken place between (1923–1939). The Egyptian Feminist Union (EFU) was founded by the former leader of the women's committee in the Wafd party, Hoda Shaarawi. This led to her participation in an international Feminist Conference in Rome and upon her return, along with Nabawiyya Musa and Saiza Nabarawi, Shaarawi caused outrage in the gesture that she made against the Egyptian authorities and traditions by throwing her veil into the sea. This act caused a particular scandal for Shaarawi was the wife of an eminent Pasha. However she was able to inspire other women to cast off their veils.

The EFU was concerned with education, social welfare, and changes in private law in order to provide equality between Egyptian men and women. It viewed the social problems of Egypt, such as poverty, prostitution, illiteracy, and poor health conditions, not as a result of a specific socioeconomic structure, but rather due to the neglect of the state in its responsibilities towards its people. The movement believed that the state had a responsibility to maintain the morality of the nation, as well as its welfare. However it defined the issues concerning women only from the narrow and class based perspective of upper-class women.

This is particularly evident in the feminist journal L'Egyptienne published by the EFU. Written and published in French, the journal was only accessible to the French speaking Egyptians who were mostly members of the upper classes. However the issues discussed in the magazine included Turkish reforms regarding women, which had influenced Egyptian women and Islam. The journal editor Saiza Nebarawi stated in 1927 that "we the Egyptian Feminists, have a great respect for our religion. In wanting to see it practised in its true spirit". Another journal, published 1937, was called el-Masreyyah (The Egyptian Woman).

Although the new Constitution of 1924 had made some changes to the position of women such as raising the age of marriage for girls to sixteen, the question of women's political rights was ignored as was the right to divorce and abolition of polygamy. In 1935 Hoda Shaarawi lectured at the American University of Cairo on the status of women and called for the abolition of polygamy. Her speech was met with protest from two Sheiks from the Al-Azhar University. However, according to Kumari Jayawordena the audience sided with Shaarawi which was symbolic of the changing educated opinion. Her speech was in fact met with such enthusiasm that it was printed in a leading newspaper and thus widely circulated through the Arabic speaking world. The rise of feminism was however stunted in Egypt by its remaining elitist nature and class bias. Its limited appeal was not fairly representative of the situation of most women in Egypt. It is claimed that to some extent the movement "followed the political practices of most parties in Egypt during the 1920s – 1930s, which regarded politics as the prerogative of the educated elite". Feminist activism began to slow down particularly due to the climate of political opinion and criticism as a result of the movement increased.

=== Examples of criticism faced by the early feminism movement ===
Change concerning the position women in Egypt was felt by many as a "final invasion in the last sphere they could control against aggressive infidels, once sovereignty and much of the economy had been taken by the west". Talaat Harb, a prominent Nationalist of his time, in "Tarbiyat al-mar'a wa-al-hijab" 1905 argued that "the emancipation of women was just another plot to weaken the Egyptian nation and disseminate immorality and decadence in its society. He criticised Egyptians who desired to ape the west and claimed that there was a European imperialist design to project a negative image of the position of Muslim women."

Not all critics were completely opposed to the idea of the emancipation of women. Ahmad as-Sayyid reassured his Nationalist leaders that despite events which were unfolding in Europe in which "women had satisfied their demands for individual rights and begun now to compete with men in politics "Our issue is not that of equality of men with women with regard to voting and positions. Our women, God bless them, do not put up such demands, which would disturb the public peace" They only demand education and instruction". Any change in Egyptian women's position in society was often therefore "legitimised by the needs of society, not by their rights as human individuals". This enabled limits to be established to prevent too much improvement in their position. By improving certain aspects of their rights and situations in Egyptian society such as access to education, meant that the upper and middle classes were satisfied.

== After World War II ==
Following the end of the Second World War and facing hard economic realities and corruption of the ancient regime (the monarchical system under King Farouk), a general impetus for another radicalization of Egyptian politics became evident. The women's movement experienced a similar transformation.

Although according to some writers the feminism began to decline in the period following the Second World War, it is argued by others that it is during precisely this period that the Women's movement came of age. According to Nelson it was only then that the movement experienced a diversification in ideology, tactics, and goals, and that it began to transcend its elitist origins and membership. This new phase in the Egyptian women's movement was characterised by a more radical approach. The voices of a younger more radical generation of Egyptian women influenced by the rise of student and labour movements began to be heard and they were not content with the status quo of the EFU. It was felt that the EFU's tactics were outdated and needed updating. The establishment of health clinics although necessary and important were no longer deemed sufficient. It was felt by the members of EFU that the distribution of charity was an inadequate solution to social problems. Fundamentally it was decided that equal rights no longer meant merely access to education but instead much more.

In 1942, the Egyptian Feminist party was founded. Headed by Fatma Neamat Rashed, the party called for complete equality between women and men in education, employment, political representation, and rights. It also called for the right to paid leave for working women. The Bint El-Nil (daughter of the Nile) was another feminist association created in 1948. Their primary purpose was to claim full political rights for women. It aimed to concentrate on introducing women's participation in the decision-making processes. It also promoted literacy programmes, campaigned to improve health services among the poor, and aimed to enhance mother's rights and childcare.

Doria Shafik was the leader of the movement and she reflected the liberal ideology of the modern feminists whose activism openly challenged the state. In 1951, a year before the 1952 Revolution, Doria Shafik and 1500 women stormed the parliament demanding full political rights, a reform of the Personal Status Law and equal pay for equal work. In 1954 Shafik and a number of women engaged in a hunger strike for ten days in protest of a constitutional committee on which women were not permitted any places. Shafik's most direct confrontation with Nasser took place in 1957. She again staged a hunger protest in demonstration against the occupation of Egyptian territories by Israeli forces and (in her view) the "dictatorial rule of the Egyptian authorities driving the country towards bankruptcy and chaos".

== From the 1950s to the early 1970s ==
In 1952, the army seized power in Egypt and deposed the King. The ruling Revolution Command Council issued a declaration demanding the dissolution of all political parties. As a result, all independent women's movements were banned. The regime's political parties replaced women's organizations. During this period the feminist movement reverted to charity associations. Significant equal rights were however granted to women during this period not only in the areas of education and work but also by the 1956 Constitution that gave women the right to vote and run for election for the first time.

== Since the early 1970s ==
The decline of the Nasserist regime signified another era in the feminist movement in Egypt. In 1972 the publication of the book Women and Sex by Nawal El Saadawi was symbolic of the re-emergence and radicalisation of the movement. The book demanded "unified criteria for 'honor' for both women and men, and denounced social practices which used religion to justify women's oppression". The book caused a strong backlash within Egyptian society especially due to the rising religious fundamentalism within the state.

During the 1980s, however, new feminist groups were formed to counter religious fundamentalism. The New Woman Group was formed in Cairo and was mainly concerned with studying the feminist history of the country in order to determine a new program which would start off from where the previous one had stopped. Another organisation was the Committee for the Defence of Women and Family Rights, which was formed in 1985. This committee was established to support the campaign for the amendment of the Person Status Code.

== In the 21st century ==
Today, there are many different feminist groups within Egypt. Some of the movements are affiliated with the state in some way in that they are women's committees of political parties such as The Progressive Women's Union to the Women's Secretariat of the Labor Party. There are however also many independent feminist associations such as The New Woman Research Centre and Bint El Ard (Daughter of the Land) Association. Although the organisations have different goals in general they all entail the improvement of women's position in Egyptian by improving literacy, democratic and human rights, increasing women's participation in political life, and women's health.

An Islamic feminist movement has also re-emerged in recent years. Islamic feminism is a "feminist discourse and practice articulated within an Islamic paradigm". Islamic feminism sees the sexes not as different in capability, but rather in their characteristics and roles in society. Followers of such beliefs hold the view that their religion has established a framework of equality and rather than calling for change to existing laws, Islamic fundamentalists cry for a return to authentic Islam so that both women and men can achieve their full potential.

Feminism seems to have become a priority of the state since 2000 with the foundation of the National Council for Women (NCW) who are very active in promoting women's rights in Egypt. In 2000 legislation was passed allowing women to divorce under the khul-law and to pass on their nationality to their biological children in 2004. These are great steps forward and due also in part to lobbying in government and outside the state structures through civil society organisations.

=== Feminism and Egyptian education ===
The Egyptian government originally revised school uniform legislation in 1994, forbidding girls under the age of 12 from covering their hair or face by wearing the hijab or veil. This was widely seen as an anti-Islamic move, and faced harsh criticism from Islamic leaders across the country. The ban was overturned in 1996 by the Supreme Court of Egypt. In August 2015, the hijab was banned again by the Minister of Education, Moheb Al-Refaei, without specifying the age at which it would be permitted. Al-Refaei stated that the Qu'ran does not require girls who have not reached puberty to wear a hijab or veil, therefore they do not need to wear it before entering middle school.

The issue of the hijab was brought to the public's attention in March 2015, after an Egyptian religion elementary school teacher in the Fayum province west of Cairo, was arrested for beating a girl in class and cutting off a lock of her hair for not wearing a hijab. While corporal punishment is seen as an acceptable form of punishment in most schools, the degree and nature of the punishment was unprecedented.

While wearing religious headdresses is not unusual in Egypt, the age at which it is appropriate for a girl to wear a hijab is a deeply debated issue among the literary scholars of Islam. Some academics theorize that the laws of Islam make it obligatory at all ages, while others theorize that it is a cultural tradition and can be worn at her own accord.

=== Sexual harassment in Egypt ===
On June 4, 2014, a law was passed criminalizing sexual harassment. This was the first law passed concerning sexual harassment in Egyptian history. The law states that verbal, physical, behavioral, phone and online sexual harassment can result in a prison sentence of 6 months to 5 years, and up to 50,000 pounds in fines. Many organizations concerning human rights allege that the enforcement of laws does not do enough in terms of eliminating an atmosphere that perpetuates harassment and sexual violence. The United Nations Entity for Gender Equality and the Empowerment of Women published a report on recent sexual harassment statistics in Egypt. Egypt has the second highest rates of reported sexual harassment, with Afghanistan ranking as the highest.

The study showed that 99 percent of Egyptian women have experienced or have been exposed to a form of sexual harassment. The survey showed that the most common form of sexual harassment was unwanted touching. The second highest form of sexual harassment was verbal sexual harassment. The survey included reports on sexual harassment according to time of day, the occupations of sexual harassers and by governorate. The research in “Study on Ways and Methods to Eliminate Sexual Harassment in Egypt” conducted by UN Women in 2013, reported that 82.6% of women said they did not feel safe in the street; 86.5% reported that their feeling of lack of safety increased when using a form of public transportation.

In 2015, in response to these statistics, Egypt made attempts to combat the issue of sexual harassment. The United Nations Population Fund recently launched a program targeting sexual harassment faced by Egyptian women in universities. Work was started on a university policy through the Ministry of Education to specifically strengthen institutional mechanisms to discourage violence against women. The program aimed to create an official channel where women would be able to report incidents of sexual harassment or violence. The educational institute would then handle the report with an adequate punishment or means of action.

In 2015, the anti-sexual harassment initiative also collaborated with popular public service companies, such as Uber, under the Safe Corporates projects. This is an organization that targets medium to large companies to train and educate their employees to take action against unwanted sexual behavior. All drivers will undergo training to ensure that the service will be safe for all women to use. The program is aimed to ensure that drivers will be able to prevent, recognize and not initiate inappropriate behavior. This training is especially significant to Uber, as the company has been involved in recent controversy with sexual harassment and even rape in France, China, Canada and India. The service was banned in Delhi after a woman reported that she was raped by her Uber driver. The training given to Uber is one of many Safe Corporates projects, all of which aim towards a zero-tolerance policy towards sexual harassment, as well as steps to eliminating an attitude of sexual harassment and violence as socially acceptable.

=== Feminist revolution ===
In late 2020, BBC News described reactions to the July 2020 Ahmed Bassam Zaki case,.and the 2014 Cairo hotel gang rape case. BBC News stated, "The stakes are high for women in Egypt, which only makes this current movement all the more remarkable. ... Despite a legal system that does not fully protect them, the shaming they may receive from families and the fact that so-called 'honour killings' still happen, the women and girls of Egypt are speaking out more than ever." Mona Eltahawy stated that she was "tenaciously optimistic ... that a feminist revolution is beginning. ... I look now at these young women and girls and queer people torpedoing through shame, and I am thrilled."

== See also ==
- Gehad Hamdy
- Nadeen Ashraf
- 678 (film)
- Egyptian Centre for Women's Rights
- Gender inequality in Egypt
- HARASSmap
- Judiciary of Egypt
- Operation Anti Sexual Harassment
- Rape in Egypt
- Mass sexual assault in Egypt
- Women in Egypt

General:

- Sex segregation and Islam
