= Sabah Khodir =

Egyptian-American poet and activist

Sabah Khodir (born c.1991) is an Egyptian-American poet and activist.

== Life ==
Khodir graduated from the University of Phoenix. In 2015 she and Mohammed Kassem cofounded EndQuote, a collaborative art platform for Middle Eastern artists.

From 2018 to 2020 Khodir wrote for the English-language news website Egyptian Streets. In 2019, after experiencing a sexual assault, she left Egypt for the United States . In July 2020, Khodir assisted the founders of Assault Police Egypt in releasing a collection of over 150 sexual assault, harassment and blackmail accusations against Egyptian student Ahmed Bassam Zaki. Working with the National Council of Women, Khodir coordinated the release of information so that victims would feel the confidence to file official complaints. Three days after the Instagram page went up, Zaki was arrested. By July 28, the Assault Police account had over 171,000 followers and had received dozens of messages about other alleged harassers.

Khodir had also helped bring to light the gang-rape case at Cairo's Fairmont hotel in 2014. 24-year-old Nazli Karim, the case's whistleblower and key witness, and the victim contacted Sabah following Zaki's detention asking for her support as an activist. She has ever since spoken loudly against the accused rapists and was one of the few voices advocating for Nazli's freedom after she and other witnesses were detained in August 2020 with no clear charges.

Khodir has spoken about her own experience of sexual assault on the BBC World Service programme Heart and Soul.

Ever since she started speaking out against the Fairmont case, Khodir had been consistently getting death and rape threats. Many of those threats come on Clubhouse, a new audio-based social media app. Saying:

“Clubhouse is still a very new app and their security and guidelines, and the way they are handling the safety of their users, is really not good. There are always rooms that are created to defame and threaten or extort women. Since day one on Clubhouse, I have been jumping from room to room where people are pinging me to help a girl where her picture or number is being posted. Rooms are created to abuse women, and lots of them are in Arabic.”

Khodir's active presence on the app, whether promoting her own discussions or fighting users who intimidate and harass women, has made her vulnerable to threats within the platform. Fake accounts often create offensive rooms with her name or go into her rooms to threaten her. Despite that, Sabah is still active on social media, where she continues to discuss the feminist agenda and speaks up against the people who are currently threatening her.
