= Rape in Egypt =

Sexual violence in Egypt

Rape in Egypt is a criminal offense with penalties ranging from lifetime sentence to capital punishment. In Egypt, marital rape is legal. By 2008, the U.N. quoted Egypt's Interior Ministry's figure that 20,000 rapes take place every year, although according to the activist Engy Ghozlan (ECWR), rapes are 10 times higher than the stats given by Interior Ministry, making it 200,000 per year. Mona Eltahawy has also noted the same figure (200,000), and added that this was before the revolution.

Rapes have been carried out during festivals and the Egyptian protests, and include the public rapes of women, and female journalists. Egypt has passed multiple laws to protect women from both online and personal harassments and approved a new law to protect women from violence at home.

== Prevalence ==
There is a tendency in Egypt, though, to not report rapes due to the fear of social rejection as well as cultural reasons. Although that has recently improved significantly due to social awareness by TV shows and by the president Abdel-Fattah El-Sisi himself.

Rania Hamid from Centre for Egyptian Women's Legal Assistance (CEWLA) says that no one tells that they have been raped, saying "Girls consider it to be quite enough that a few people know about the rape." Rania Hamid further describes the problem, that even if a girl were to reveal that she has been raped, the whole issue would evoke the issue of honour: "There are problems of honour. Sometimes a brother or cousin may kill her, saying 'you wanted this, you encouraged this, you’re not honourable, and what is that you are wearing?...' Of course it’s not her fault, but who are you going to tell that to? The girl, or society?". Honor killings are not common in Egypt but they mostly happen in Upper Egypt.

Honour crimes are not specifically mentioned in Egyptian law but are specifically condoned in some sections of the criminal code. Statistics for honor assaults and killings do not exist common in Egypt but there are individual reports of them in rural areas and local media reports of their occurrence in Upper Egypt.

Farah Shash, a psychologist explains that young boys are rarely stopped or opposed by their parents for molesting girls publicly, it's because the children always saw the same behavior around them. Shash further adds that "Often, families will just laugh". According Seif el-Dawla who runs a center in the country told that "Sexual molestation and harassment ... is routine for women who come across police".

The Egyptian Centre for Women's Rights (ECWR) has called the problem "social cancer" and suggested that dress code is not deterrent at all. ECWR carried out a survey in 2008 which found that 83 percent of Egyptian women and 98 percent of foreign women within Egypt had experienced sexual harassment at some time, and only 12% had gone to police for complaining such issue. Over 62% of Egyptian men admitted harassing women, and 53% of Egyptian men have blamed women for 'bringing it on.'

A CNN opinion piece cites a 404 error page claiming the United Nations Entity for Gender Equality on May 23, 2013, reported that an estimated 99.3% of Egyptian women said they faced some form of sexual violence. The source was a 2013 UN report which estimated that 99.3% of women aged 10-35 had been sexually harassed (including wolf whistles, dirty looks, and other non-violent harassment) and 90.9% had been raped.

Activists in 2012 alleged that the Muslim Brotherhood pays for raping women and beating men who gather to protest.

In August 2020, Egypt's public prosecution was seeking to arrest nine suspects accused of gang-raping a woman at Fairmont Nile City hotel in Cairo in 2014; however, lack of action for six years was due to the fact that six men involved in the incident were from powerful families. although that did not stop people from talking about them and the Egyptian media city produced a series called "El Tawoos" which talked about the families and their abuse of power and how they dodge the law, the series was under pressure to be shut down but many actors and Egyptians online refused to let the series get shut down and it continued to air and raise awareness.

Later in May 2021, the public prosecutors announced the release of four suspects who were arrested with involvement in the Fairmont Hotel rape case. The reason for their release was cited as lack of evidence and contradictory testimonies gathered from the 39 people interviewed for the statement. The news was followed by criticism expressed by Egyptians on social networking platforms such as Facebook, although the investigation is temporarily stopped to gather evidence.

== Security forces ==
There are incidents in which military men had raped a civilian. In April 2014, it was reported that the Egyptian police were using rape as a weapon against the political dissidents. In relation to this report, one of the victims had raised the issue during the first judicial hearing, although the victim's complaint was ignored.

== Child sexual abuse ==
A survey of male and female students at Sohag University found an overall child sexual abuse prevalence of 29.8%, with the rate for females (37.8%) being higher than that for males (21.2%). Hugging and kissing in a way that disturbed the victim were the most reported type of child sexual abuse. 76.1% of the abuse was not disclosed to another party.

Child rape as a form of punishment has been reported.

An Egyptian TV series named Burying Girls Alive, shown on one of the satellite channels during Ramadan, shows an old man simply buying a teenage girl by taking advantage of poverty.

The high rate of rape and abduction of Coptic children by Islamists has also been documented both during President Morsi's rule.

== Mass sexual assault ==
=== During protests ===
During the 2011–2014 Egyptian protests, rape had been carried out publicly due to lack of law and order.

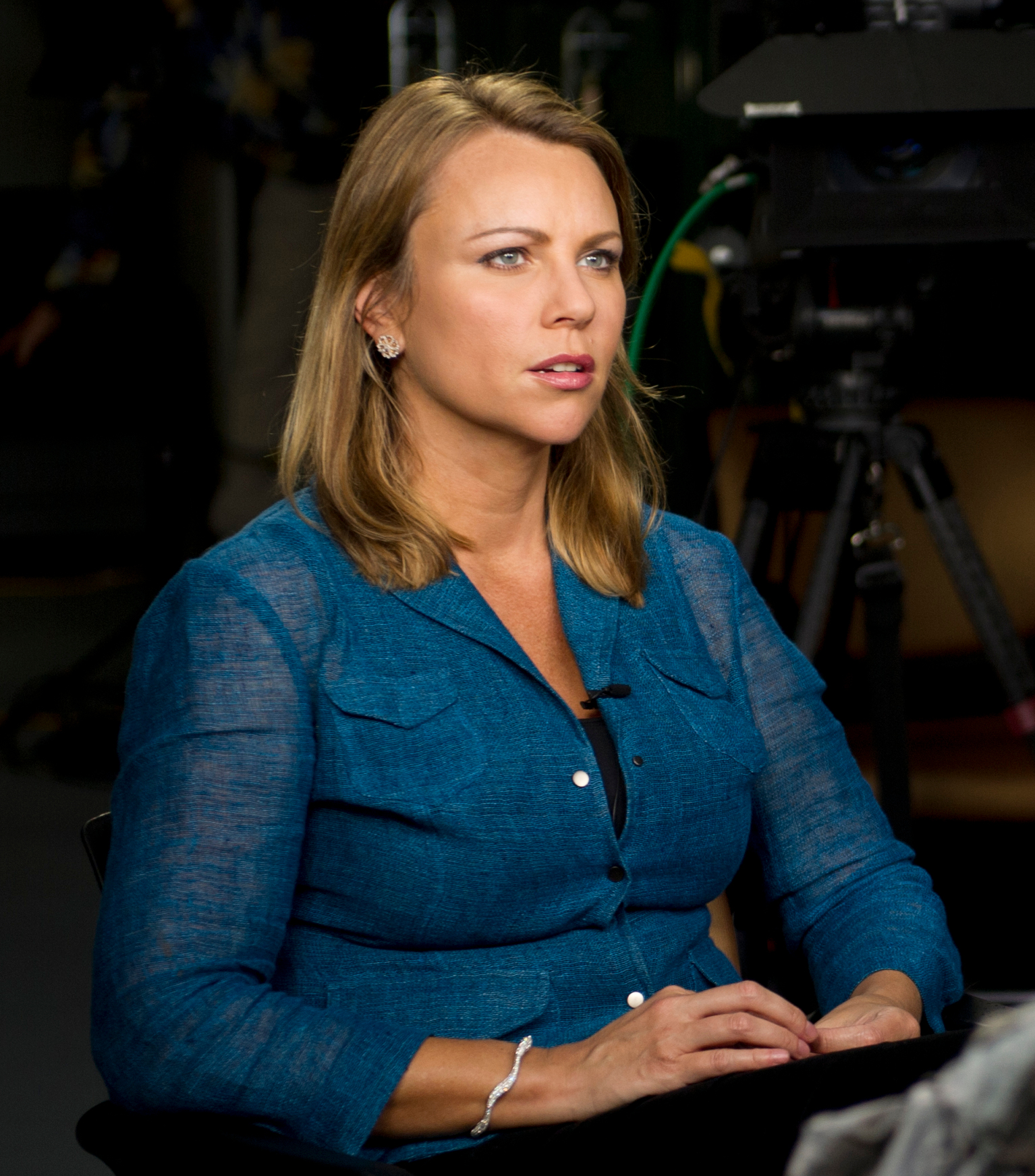
Lara Logan

CBS correspondent Lara Logan revealed in her 60 Minutes program that she and her CBS crew were arrested and detained for one night by the Egyptian Army on 3 February 2011, while covering the Egyptian Revolution. She said the crew was blindfolded and handcuffed at gunpoint, and their driver beaten. They were advised to leave the country, but were later released. On 15 February 2011, CBS News released a statement that Logan had been beaten and sexually assaulted on 11 February, while covering the celebrations in Tahrir Square following Hosni Mubarak's resignation.

In Logan's own words, they raped her with their hands, while taking photographs with their cellphones. They began pulling her body in different directions, pulling her hair so hard she said it seemed they were trying to tear off chunks of her scalp. Believing she was dying, she was dragged along the square to where the crowd was stopped by a fence, alongside which a group of women were camping. One woman wearing a chador put her arms around Logan, and the others closed ranks around her, while some men who were with the women threw water at the crowd.

A group of soldiers appeared, beat back the crowd with batons, and one of them threw Logan over his shoulder. She was flown back to the U.S. the next day, where she spent four days in the hospital. She was contacted by US President Barack Obama when she arrived home. CBS said it remained unclear who the attackers were, and unlikely that any would be prosecuted.

After the fall of Mubarak, there was a rapid escalation, beginning with the attacks, on the night he stepped down. The Egyptian journalist Mona Eltahawy was sexually assaulted by a gang of security men after being detained. An Egyptian journalist Hania Moheeb was trapped for more than an hour among men who sexually assaulted her.

A 22-year-old female Dutch journalist was gang raped by five men during the protest.

Such incidents do not seem to be opposed by the government or officials, but instead seem to have gathered support. A report by Nina Burleigh quotes Egyptian Salafi preacher Ahmad Mahmoud Abdullah who said that "women protesting in Tahrir Square have no shame and want to be raped".

After the revolution, about 50% of women have reported more harassment. 44% said that harassment remained is same as it was before, while, over 58% of men surveyed said that harassment has increased after the revolution.

=== Eid al Fitr assaults ===
There were several accounts of a heightened number of sexual assaults and rapes taking place during Eid al Fitr in 2006 in Egypt, some noting as well the precautions being taken to prevent a recurrence of such problems. Subsequent reports indicated that this phenomenon continued to cause concern, one journalist reporting from Egypt wrote in The Guardian in 2012, "The Eid al-Fitr holiday following this year's Ramadan brought its usual share of sexual harassment".

An Egyptian group founded to protect against sexual assaults, "described Eid al-Fitr as a 'season for harassment'", and the prevalence of such attacks "a trend that has become associated with Eid al-Fitr celebrations in recent years". Again in 2013, the same allegations surfaced in Cairo and Tanta. Public discussion of the problem in Egypt has been reported to be difficult.

2014 saw lower rates of attempted harassment, and activists reported women and girls were more confident that assaults would be punished since amendment of the penal code earlier in the year. Six arrests were reported in Eid. In 2015, 141 police reports for sexual harassment were filed during Eid in Cairo. It was claimed the lack of data security or of a support mechanism after reporting hindered confidence, leading to many reports being subsequently withdrawn. Female concern about assault was still strong in 2016, but reported arrests and complaints were down.

== See also ==
- Egyptian Centre for Women's Rights
- HARASSmap
- Operation Anti Sexual Harassment
- 678 (film)
- 2014 Cairo hotel gang rape case
- Gehad Hamdy
- Nadeen Ashraf

General:

- Feminism in Egypt
- Gender inequality in Egypt
- Women in Egypt
- Crime in Egypt
