= Gender inequality in Egypt =

Traditional gender roles in Egypt are prevalent and clearly defined. These roles are largely associated with traditional Islamic family structures, wherein women's roles are closely tied to the domestic sphere and men's roles tied to the public sphere (see: Women in Egypt). Gender roles are based on assumed biological differences between the sexes and can lead to dramatically different life experiences as well as opportunities and outcomes for individuals. Consequently, when looking at a number of indicators, women often find themselves disadvantaged relative to men.

In 2022, the UNDP's Gender Inequality Index (GII) rated Egypt 105th out of 193 countries, with an overall value of 0.389, where a score of zero represents perfect gender parity according to the metrics used. These indicators suggest strong gender-based disparities in areas of reproductive health, economic functioning, and overall empowerment. Reasons for inequalities are numerous; social norms and attitudes, economic pressures, religious beliefs, and structural forces all help maintain the status .

== Legal status and marriage law ==
Marriage is the formal institution wherein women's different legal status is most apparent. Official age of consent for marriage is 16 for girls and 18 for boys, though child marriage of females still continues in certain areas without legal intervention.

Divorce procedures differ by gender, with divorces being more freely granted to men. A man can divorce his wife by saying "you are divorced" three times. The proceeding is then formalized within 30 days by registering the divorce with a notary. Women are then entitled to financial maintenance for up to two years. Some women, when negotiating with their husbands for divorce, are willing to forfeit the financial assistance in exchange for him initiating the divorce. Women sometimes choose this option because of the legal red tape that is involved in wife-initiated divorce.

In the past, women were required to prove the fault of the husband before being granted a divorce. In 2000, the law was amended by "The Law on Reorganization of Certain Terms and Procedures of Litigation in Personal Status Matters", a hotly contested legal act that broadened women's access to divorce. Under this new law, a woman could pursue a divorce without having to prove the fault of the husband. However, this type of divorce, 'khula', would mean a reduction in the woman's financial rights. The law is somewhat flexible in that it allows for the couple to adhere to conditions of divorce set up in advance. Women are still able to pursue a divorce through the traditional means wherein the fault of the husband must be proven. This method allows women greater financial rights and protections.

With Egypt's political upheaval and legal turmoil, the future of women's legal rights within marriage (and other areas) are uncertain. Islamist and conservative groups have raised objections to the Khula Law. These groups also oppose the institutionalization of CEDAW (the Convention on the Elimination of all forms of Discrimination Against Women).

Egyptian marital laws also allow for multiple spouses for all Muslim men. The same allowances are not granted for women, though a wife has some say in whether or not her husband takes a second wife.

== Political participation ==
. After the revolution that ousted Mubarak, the number of women in office decreased. The 2013 Human Development Report states that 2.2% parliamentary positions are held by women.

As political participants, women have been active in the revolutions of the Arab Spring, as well as subsequent protests and debates regarding the future of their nation. Estimates suggest that as many as 55% of protesters were female and approximately 60% of people voting in the most recent election were female. In early 2014, equal rights and protections for women were included in the newest Egyptian constitution, reversing many of the restrictions imposed by the more conservative Mohamed Morsi regime. Although women are not guaranteed a minimum number of seats in parliament, laws forbidding discrimination based on gender was included. In addition, women are to be given access to higher judiciary positions for the first time. This has provided the legal framework for greater gender equality, though enforcement will determine its effectiveness.

In February 2014, Egypt elected its first female political party leader; Hala Shukrallah, a Coptic Christian, was elected to represent the Constitution Party.

== Education ==
Literacy rates for young adults (15- to 24-year-olds) show some gender-based disparity. As of 2011, overall literacy rates were 93.2% of men and 86.5% women. These numbers have increased dramatically over recent years as Egypt has made greater financial investments in this sector. Because of vast improvements in Egypt's education system, younger generations are much more likely to be literate than the older generations. The most disadvantaged group are rural adult women. The 2006 Human Development Report (HDR) estimated that only 15% of female household heads in rural areas were literate.

Egypt has made significant progress in narrowing the primary and secondary education gap between boys and girls. As of 2010, the female to male ratio was 0.96.

New generations of Egyptians have placed a higher value on female education than in the past. In 2011 it is estimated that of the 2.6 million students enrolled in tertiary education, 51% of them were female. This is significantly higher than the Arab regional and global averages of 24% and 29% respectively.

== Employment ==
Participation in the labor force shows substantial differences between the genders. While unemployment rates are high, evidence suggests a substantial male bias in hiring. As of 2012, women made up 24.2% of the labor force, a percentage that has remained stagnant for no less than two decades.

The World Bank reports that women face far more hostility in the overall business environment, citing a finding that showed "...female-owned firms in Egypt report needing 86 weeks on average to resolve a conflict through the legal system, compared to 54 weeks for male-owned firms."

Unemployment rates are high for all young Egyptians, though it is particularly high for females. A study in 2010 showed that only 13.4% of women in the 15–29 age bracket are employed or looking for work. Although more women are economically active in the upper income quintiles, they are still underrepresented at 35.1% of women with a vocational or post-secondary education. University graduated women are significantly more economically active than women with less education at 46.7%. However, at least 80% of all men in all income brackets are employed or looking for work.

A study by Ghada Barsoum suggests that there is a difference in reasons to pursue employment between unmarried and married women. Despite high education attainment, unmarried women pursue jobs to save money for marriage and married women work to provide additional income for the family. Employment can be in the public, private, or agricultural sectors, and in formal or informal sectors There needs to be a clearer list of employment sectors in Egypt and what groups of women fall into these sectors due to the uneven distribution of their placement and implicit effects on the nation’s economy.

Efforts in government to push for women's employment has seen some results, with 50.4% of leadership positions at the Ministry of Environment filled by women. This stands in contrast to the overall government ministry average as of March 2025, which was 27%.

== Health ==
=== Life expectancy ===
Given normal circumstances, women on average outlive men. Life expectancy in Egypt is consistent with this biological reality. Women live an estimated 76.2 years and men 70.82 years.

=== Reproductive and maternal health ===
Women's access to contraception and family planning may be limited, with 60.3% of women using contraception of any kind. Younger women appear to be more likely to use contraception than older generations. A 2011 Population Fund survey found that 75% of married women aged 15–29 have used contraception.

Adolescent fertility rates in Egypt were 44 per 1000 in 2012, significantly higher than most economically developed countries and likely a result of early marriage and lack of universal access to family planning services.

Between 1992 and 2000 Egypt made tremendous gains in reducing maternal mortality rates – a drop of 52% (174/100,000 to 84/100,000). The rate has since decreased further to 66/100,000. A woman's lifetime risk of dying during childbirth is 1:490.

=== HIV/AIDS ===
As of 2012, known HIV infection rates are virtually the same for both sexes at .1%, making it one of the lowest rates in Africa. However, lack of widespread public awareness, discreet testing options, and social stigma may contribute to an underestimation of cases of infection.

Despite low infection rates, international organizations like UNICEF are expressing some concern. Young women with comprehensive knowledge about the disease has decreased in recent years from 62% (2005) to 30% (2008). UNICEF also reports that the number of young people aware that HIV infection could be prevented with condoms dropped from 22% to 13%.

== Gender-based violence ==
=== Sexual harassment ===
Most Egyptian women have experienced some form of sexual harassment. Frequency of reported incidents varies. However, in one of the most recent studies, an April 2013 UN survey shows that 99.3% of women have experienced sexual harassment. A January 2011 survey of youth stated the 13.5% of women felt that sexual harassment was the most serious risk they face on Egypt's streets on a day-to-day basis. 15.9% felt it was the greatest risk when using bus transportation and 23% felt it was the greatest risk they face when taking the train. This survey was taken before the epidemic of sexual violence that accompanied recent episodes of widespread public unrest.

=== Sexual violence ===
Total number of incidents of sexual violence is difficult to measure as many women are reluctant to come forth due to the social stigma associated with sexual victimization. Most cases of rape and sexual assault are not brought to the attention of authorities or prosecuted. Shame, fear of being blamed, loss of face, or in some cases, fear of being a victim of "honor killing" prevents most women from seeking help. Despite these difficulties, the Egyptian Interior Ministry estimates there are no less than 20,000 women raped annually.

With the unrest associated with the 2011 revolution and political strife in Egypt, normal social order has been disrupted. As a result, hundreds of women have been victims of random sexual violence in public. Tahrir Square has been the site of many such assaults, with 150 attacks against women by groups of men reported during the single week of Hosni Mubarak's ouster. Again, during the removal of Mohamed Morsi and the subsequent social unrest and jubilation in Tahrir in 2013, 80 women were subjected to sexual violence by mobs of men in one night. There were a total of no less than 169 cases of such attacks against women during that week. Attacks against women appear to have been carried out in a premeditated fashion by men emboldened with a sense of impunity.

Attitudes regarding sexual violence against women provide considerable obstacles in regard to mobilizing public action against it. In early 2012, members of Egypt's upper parliamentary house engaged in victim-blaming, with one representative saying, "Women contribute 100% to their rape because they put themselves in that position." While this attitude is not representative of all Egyptians, it is widespread enough to present challenges for women who participate in the political action.

Such attitudes toward women and prevalence of sexual violence and harassment against them, contribute substantially to Egypt being named the worst Arab state for women by an extensive Thomas Reuters Foundation study.

=== Intimate partner/domestic violence ===
The 2009 UNFPA Violence Against Women Summary Finding confirmed that spousal violence is a significant problem in Egypt. Studies from 1995 to 2005 showed no decrease in prevalence, though some methodological inconsistencies in surveys between those years makes direct comparison somewhat complicated. The study showed that in 2005, 33% of women reported having been subject to some form of physical violence by their current or previous husband. These rates decreased in higher income and education brackets, although approximately one quarter of women in those highest brackets report having been "beaten" by their husbands at some point during their marriage.

=== Female genital mutilation (FGM) ===
Female genital mutilation, also called female circumcision, involves removal of some or all of a female's genitalia. More severe – and far less common – forms involve complete removal of the genitals and sewing up of the vagina until only a very small hole remains for urine and menstrual blood vacate. FGM is commonplace in Egypt, with an estimated 90-97% of women undergoing some version of the procedure. The practice is deeply engrained in the culture and predates both Christianity and Islam. Its main purpose is to preserve chastity, though its social function is very complicated. FGM is seen by all major international human rights organizations as a violation of a woman's bodily integrity and sexual health.

Numbers of circumcised females decrease in lower age brackets. Among all females surveyed in a 2011 study of over 15,000 individuals, 75.5% of women aged 10–29 report being circumcised. The practice appears to be more common in rural areas where 83.7% of females have experienced FGM. While these numbers are lower than older age brackets, they are largely consistent with the 10- to 29-year-old group surveyed in an identical 2008 study. This would suggest that any decline in practice has slowed significantly or stagnated. The same study showed the majority of respondents, both male and female, believed that circumcision was necessary for girls (64%). More men (70.3%) believed it was needed than women (57.6%). Belief in the practice is stronger in the lower income quintiles and considerably weaker in the upper quintiles.

FGM was banned in Egypt in 2007. In 2015 the first conviction for performing FGM took place.

== The Convention on the Elimination of all forms of Discrimination Against Women (CEDAW) ==
Egypt is a signatory to The Convention on the Elimination of all forms of Discrimination Against Women.

CEDAW was adopted by the United Nations General Assembly on December 18, 1979. The treaty seeks to define discrimination against women as a human rights issue, create a plan of action to address gender disparities, and to hold nations accountable. Countries that ratify the convention pledge to take strong steps in order to end discriminatory practices and violence against women. To date, 189 countries have signed CEDAW.

Egypt, along with a significant number of countries, ratified the convention, spelling out numerous reservations. Egypt made the following reservations:

- Women should not have equal rights to determine the nationality of their children. A woman's child in Egypt shall always be the nationality of the father.
- Marriage laws, based on sacrosanct religious believes, should remain as is. Women must seek a divorce through the ruling of a judge whereas men have no such requirement.
- Egypt is not bound by the section of article 1 (definition of discrimination against females) that requires the submission to any body of arbitration to resolve disputes between the State and the Convention.
- Egypt will not comply to any part of the Convention that runs counter to Islamic law.

The new constitution, ratified in January 2014, appears to take a different approach to women's rights as they relate to CEDAW. The constitution now states that women have equal right to give pass citizenship to their children. Egypt's intentions to uphold and pursue the goals of CEDAW in general have also been emphasized and codified.

== See also ==
- 678 (film)
- Egyptian Centre for Women's Rights
- Feminism in Egypt
- HARASSmap
- Judiciary of Egypt
- Operation Anti Sexual Harassment
- Rape in Egypt
- Mass sexual assault in Egypt
