= Egyptian Centre for Women's Rights =

Egyptian Centre for Women's Rights (ECWR) المركز المصري لحقوق المرأة
- Founded: 1996
- Type: Non-profit
- Location: Cairo (Egypt)
- Region served: Egypt
- Key people: Nihad Abu Al Qumsan (Chairperson)
- Website: Official website

The Egyptian Centre for Women's Rights (ECWR) is a civil, independent, non-governmental, non-partisan, not-for-profit organization in Egypt. It supports Egyptian woman in obtaining full rights and equality with men. In addition, the ECWR motivates legislative authorities to review legislation related to women's rights, not only as it relates to the Egyptian Constitution, but to international agreements as well. The ECWR advocates for women's rights in both the civil and political spheres, and offers legal services to women who can not afford to pay for them. Nihad Abu Al-Qumsan heads the organization.

According to a survey issued by the ECWR in 2008, 83 percent of Egyptian women and 98 percent of foreign women within Egypt had experienced sexual harassment at some time. Of those who reported cases of sexual harassment to ECWR, only 12 percent had gone to the police with a complaint.

== See also ==
- 678 (film)
- Feminism in Egypt
- Gender inequality in Egypt
- HARASSmap
- Judiciary of Egypt
- Mass sexual assault in Egypt
- Operation Anti Sexual Harassment
- Rape in Egypt
- Women in Egypt
