= Nadeen Ashraf =

Egyptian feminist activist

- نادين اشرف
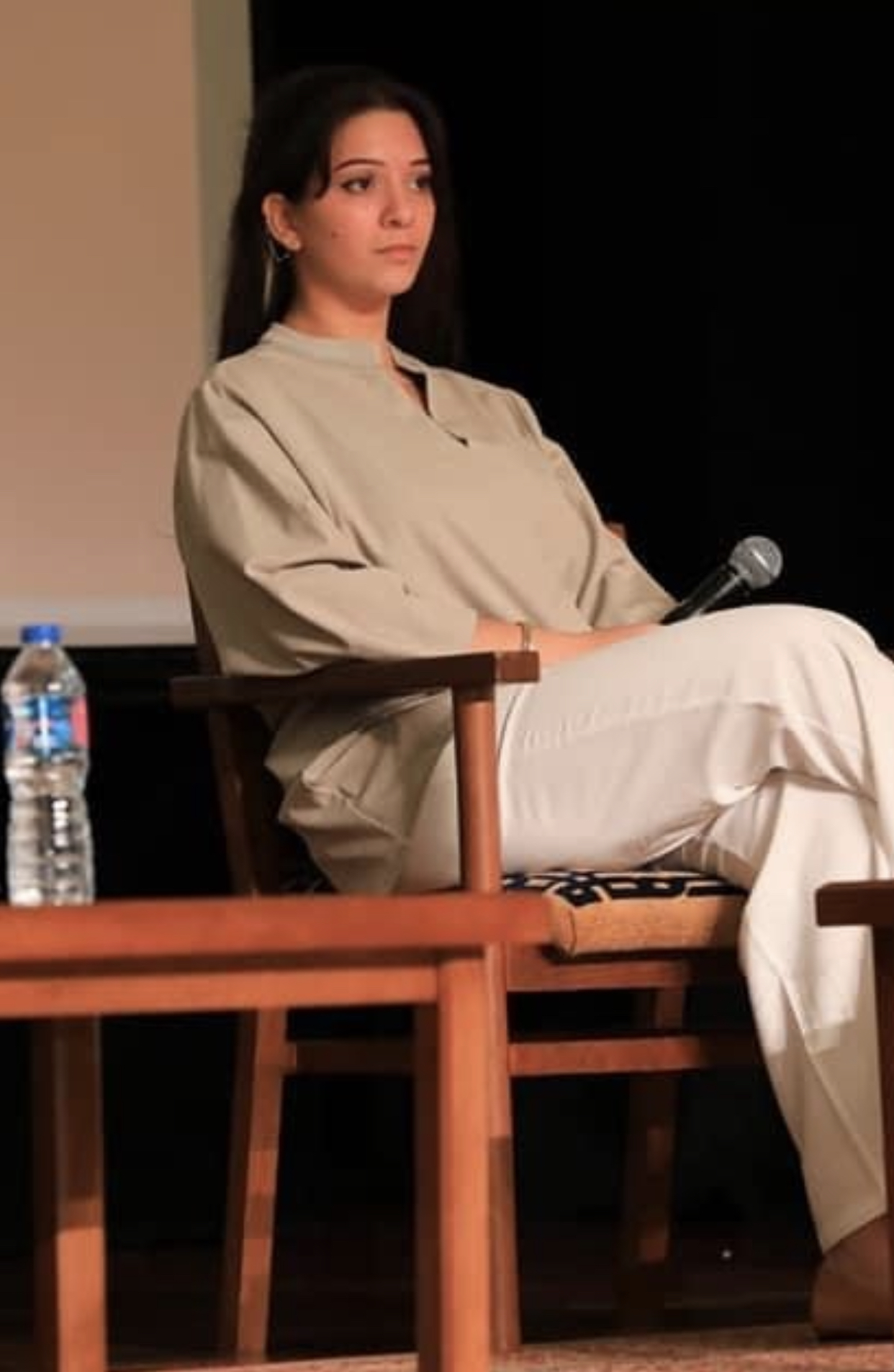
- Nadeen Ashraf at a discussion panel at the American University in Cairo's event series Speak Up addressing sexual harassment in universities across Egypt
- Born: 12 March 1998 (age 28); Cairo, Egypt
- Citizenship: Egypt
- Education: The American University in Cairo
- Occupations: Student and activist
- Known for: Insitigating the #MeToo movement in Egypt
- Awards: BBC's 100 Women, Equality Now's Changemaker Award presented by Gucci

Nadeen Ashraf (Arabic: نادين اشرف; born 12 March 1998) is an Egyptian feminist activist. Her use of social media instigated the #MeToo movement within Egypt. She is part of the BBC's 100 Women of 2020 list.

== Biography ==
Ashraf was born in Cairo in 1998. Her father is a software developer and her mother is a nutritionist. As of 2020, she was studying Philosophy and Political Science at the American University in Cairo. On the night of 1 July 2020, Ashraf set up an Instagram account page named "Assault Police", which was the first public platform to enable Egyptian women to have a voice in the #MeToo movement. In a 2013 poll, 99% of Egyptian women said they had experienced harassment.

== Assault Police Egypt ==
The "Assault Police" Instagram account was initially set up by Ashraf to provide a platform for women who had experienced sexual assault and rape to anonymously make their experiences public. The account played a prominent role in uncovering the case of the harasser and alleged rapist, Ahmed Bassam Zaki, who was sentenced to three years in prison for online sexual harassment charges in December 2020. Another case that came to light through the account was the alleged gang rape of a woman in a hotel in 2014 by a group of men from powerful families who, it was claimed, filmed themselves and circulated the video online. The "Assault Police" account's content expanded from whistle-blowing to express general concerns about sexual violence, as well as to educate and provide resources to women.

The "Assault Police" account encouraged others to share their experiences, a movement the media called Egypt's #MeToo. It has also spurred other movements and encouraged other women to speak out against sexual harassment, such as students at the Higher Film Institute of Egypt.

Responding to the growing public debate over women's safety, parliament passed a law in August giving women the automatic right to anonymity when reporting sex crimes in the conservative nation in a bid to encourage more to report sexual assaults. The high profile case caused public figures and organisations in Egypt to speak out against rape and sexual violence. Al-Azhar Mosque published a statement encouraging women to report incidents, saying that silence posed a threat to society and led to more violations.

Assault Police account temporarily went offline on the 29th of July for 10 days as its administrator had received a number of serious death threats. The threats came after Assault Police's posts about various alleged gang rapes, including the alleged gang rape at the Fairmont hotel in 2014.

At the end of 2020, Ashraf was planning to evolve the Instagram account to a full-time organization that can support survivors in a variety of ways: from helping them contact professionals to offering them legal assistance and therapy, but the account has been off since 2021.

== Awards ==
In 2020, Ashraf was listed as one of the BBC's 100 Women of the year. She was also awarded the Changemaker Award at the Equality Now Virtual Gala, sponsored by Gucci.

== See also ==
- Rape in Egypt
- Mass sexual assault in Egypt
- Feminism in Egypt
