= Operation Anti Sexual Harassment =

Activist group in Cairo

Operation Anti Sexual Harassment, (Arabic: قوة ضد التحرش, transliterated: Quwwa did al-taharrush, also known as OpAntiSH) is an activist group in Cairo, Egypt, whose goal is to prevent sexual harassment and assault, and in particular the mass sexual assaults that occur during protests and religious festivals. The group is known for intervening in assaults by mobs in Cairo's Tahrir Square and is one of several that have begun to organize against sexual harassment of women in Tahrir since the 2011 Egyptian revolution.

== Background ==
Although sexual harassment in the streets of Egypt predates the 2011 revolution, and is thought to have been a tactic of the Mubarak-era state used against female activists since 2005, reported cases of group sexual assaults during demonstrations in Tahrir square have been on the rise since 2011. The first to gain international attention was South African reporter Lara Logan, who was sexually assaulted by a gang of men on 11 February 2011, the night of Mubarak's resignation. It has been reported that at least 25 women were sexually assaulted in Tahrir during protests in January 2013 on the occasion of the revolution's second anniversary. In accounts collected by OpAntiSh and other groups and some published in social media, women describe being stripped, beaten, molested and raped.

While some attacks appear to be spontaneous and stem from mob mentality, OpAntiSH activists believe that at least some of the sexual assaults are planned and carried out by organized gangs, to keep women from participating in the revolution's protests in Tahrir square. They point to the timing and patterns of the attacks and persistence of the harassers when confronted. Dalia Abdel Hameed, of the Egyptian Initiative for Personal Rights (EIPR) has said, “The easiest way to punish women in this country is through sexuality. In a culture that blames the victim, women start to believe that they shouldn’t go to the square.”

== Organization ==
OpAntiSH was established in November 2012 by volunteers, including those affiliated with Mosireen, an Egyptian revolutionary media group. OpAntiSH first appeared in Tahrir Square on 30 November 2012, during protests against President Mohamed Morsi's constitutional declaration, alongside groups like Banat Misr Khatt Ahmar (Egypt's Girls Are a Red Line), which was founded earlier in 2012. OpAntiSH's campaigns against sexual harassment are supported by a coalition of organizations like HARASSmap, which collects and maps crowd-sourced data about sexual harassment in Egypt, and Egyptian Initiative for Personal Rights, a human rights organization founded in 2002. OpAntiSH's slogan is "A safe square for all." The group continues to gather new volunteers, some joining to help protect others after being rescued from sexual assault themselves.

== Methods ==
OpAntiSH uses a variety of methods to combat sexual harassment, in attempts to remove barriers to women's participation in street protests by keeping them physically and emotionally safe. Volunteers in the group conduct outreach and publicity to raise awareness of sexual harassment, and provide legal, medical, and psychological support as well as safe houses that can be used for recovery by women who have been assaulted. Hotline numbers are passed out on days of major protests. When assaults are reported, requests for help are routed using social media to teams of men, women and people carrying flares and spare clothing. These teams spread out across the square to rescue women as assaults are taking place, particularly during major demonstrations such as the one marking the second anniversary of the 2011 revolution on 25 January 2013. Because activists rescuing others are also in danger of assault, OpAntiSH estimates it needs at least 6 groups of 15 volunteers to spread protection across the square.

Volunteers in the rescue squads are trained in an approach that has been developed based on the experience of mob assaults in Tahrir and past rescue efforts led by other individuals and groups in the square. OpAntiSH instructs rescuers to keep calm and avoid the use of force if possible, in order to diffuse mobs involved in the attack and minimize trauma to victims. The teams form a human chain around the woman being attacked, a female volunteer moves in to help clothe the victim, and group works together to bring her to safety.

OpAntiSH believes that women's participation is important in rescue efforts both to engage with harassers and offer support to victims. “The solution is not just for men to defend us. We, too, have to participate. I believe it’s a women’s fight,” Reem Labib, one of the group's female activists, has said.

== See also ==
- Egyptian Centre for Women's Rights
- Feminism in Egypt
- Gender inequality in Egypt
- HARASSmap
- Judiciary of Egypt
- Rape in Egypt
- Mass sexual assault in Egypt
- Women in Egypt
- 678 (film)
- Alli Arjuna
