= Helen Milner (digital inclusion) =

Helen Louise Milner OBE is the Chief Executive of the Good Things Foundation (formerly Tinder Foundation), a digital inclusion and social inclusion charity based in the UK. Following a 30-year career working on the internet and with communities, in 2012 Milner was inducted into the British Interactive Media Association's Digital Hall of Fame, and in 2013 became a member of The House of Commons Speaker's Commission for Digital Democracy. In June 2015 Milner was appointed an OBE for services to digital inclusion in the Queen's Birthday Honours List.

== Career ==
Milner started her career in the private sector with The Times Network for Schools, helping develop online education services for schools before the World Wide Web had been invented.

Her work led to collaboration with Hansard Society and John Craven's Newsround, with schools running elections as part of the 1987 general election. Results were published and broadcast online via TTNS, using a Dialcom email system. Online conferencing, like social media today, allowed for Milner to run a world tour, with school children spending eight weeks in eight different countries as a pilot for the expansion of online within schools and public institutions. References to the early pioneering that TTNS did are hard to find, there is a quote from a TES article in 1985 quoted in the TES in 2010: "As early as March 1, 1985, The TES ran an article with the very 21st-century headline "On-Line Services". Written by futurologist and author Ray Hammond, it began: "The telephone is the cheapest and most powerful of all computer accessories … The article is not about the internet – that was still to come. But it did point out that there were many useful databases out there that were waiting patiently for a time when they could be accessed from the outside. They included Lockheed's Dialog, the British Library Automated Information Service (BLAISE) and The Times Network for Schools (TTNS). "Now that day has arrived," wrote Mr Hammond, "the humble school micro provides a gateway to a world of knowledge so vast that it is breathtaking at first acquaintance."" And a teacher on the National Archive of Educational Computing site explains what TTNS is: "Schools were linked up via computer and we were able to access an early version of what we now have on the internet today – TTNS it was called – The Times Network for Schools. We could also send messages to the other six schools who were connected up with us. I saw computer use motivate young people who were turned off education."

Milner worked further in online services for schools and students in Australia and Japan, before being appointed Deputy Director of Learning Development Services at the University of Sunderland in 1991. In 1995, she ran a dual broadcast conference in Sydney and Sunderland via. video conferencing about technology and learning, which was one of the first of its kind.

Pioneering the ‘university for industry’ pilot in 1997 with the Institute for Public Policy Research and University of Sunderland. She published the findings of the pilot with Josh Hillman, Nick Pearce, and Mike Thorne. Milner informed the creation of learndirect and was appointed to create and lead the network with Ufi in 1999.

Milner created an autonomous delivery unit for the UK online centres network while working at Ufi, before establishing Tinder Foundation (first as Online Centres Foundation) in 2011 to manage the UK online centres contract as a separate business. In July 2013, Online Centres Foundation became known as the Tinder Foundation to reflect the widening remit of the organisation, including community action and digital strategy as well as digital inclusion and learning.

Tinder Foundation and its subsidiary products such as Learn My Way, Community How To and the Digihousing Hub has helped over 1.5 million people gain basic digital skills and use the internet to improve their lives by 2015, and more than 100,000 people back into employment. Milner's work has allowed for collaboration with NHS England, EE, TalkTalk, Vodafone, Facebook and Google.

In 2013 Helen was asked by the Speaker of the House of Commons, John Bercow, to be a Commissioner on The Speaker's Commission on Digital Democracy. The Commission published its report "Open Up" in January 2015. Helen Milner gave the Annual Lecture on Digital Democracy for Digital Leaders in February 2015.

In November 2014 Milner gave a speech at TEDx in Sheffield.

In 2014 – 2015, Milner was a member of the Strategic Group advising on the creation of the Strategy for Public Libraries in Scotland, 2015 – 2020.

== Awards and achievements ==
In 2012, Milner was inducted into the British Interactive Media Association's Digital Hall of Fame for the 20 most influential Britons working in digital.

In 2014, Milner was listed as number 25th most influential person in UK IT by Computer Weekly.

Milner was a Commissioner for Social Mobility for Brent Council.

Since November 2013 Milner is a member of The House of Commons Speaker's Commission for Digital Democracy.

In June 2015 Milner was appointed an OBE for services to digital inclusion in the Queen's Birthday Honours List.

Milner speaks at numerous digital conferences and events, and is a judge for the tech4good awards as well as the tenant association TPAS Awards.

== Other interests ==
Outside of her career, Milner has dedicated much of her time to helping others too, and is a prominent volunteer and political activist in her Sheffield community. She helped set up a cafe at education charity Whirlow Hall Farm.
