= HARASSmap =

- Formation: 2005
- Founder: Rebecca Chiao
- Founded at: Egypt
- Type: Non-profit
- Purpose: To try to reduce the social acceptability of sexual harassment throughout Egypt
- Website: harassmap.org

HARASSmap is a mobile and online technology non-profit that uses interactive mapping to try to reduce the social acceptability of sexual harassment throughout Egypt.

== History ==
As of 2005, HARASSmap co-founder Rebecca Chiao began investigating the prevalence of sexual harassment in the daily life of Egyptian women and eventually, with the help of friends and volunteers, launched a campaign that would eventually be adopted by the Egyptian Center for Women's Rights. While these efforts were aimed towards changing sexual harassment legislation within the Egyptian government to better criminalize offences, there was a push for more urgent action. In a 2008 study conducted by the Egyptian Center for Women's Rights, researchers found that out of the 1,010 women they surveyed, 83% of Egyptian women and 98% of foreign women in Egypt said they had experienced sexual harassment. Deciding it was time for some on-the-ground action, Chiao and HARASSmap co-founder Engy Ghozlan decided to harness the power of a mobile friendly population and linked FrontlineSMS and Ushahidi to create the technological basis for HARASSmap.

=== Founders ===
HARASSmap was co-founded in 2010 by Rebecca Chiao (Project Leader), Engy Ghozlan, Amel Fahmy (Principal investigator of Research Unit) and Sawsan Gad.

== Mission ==
As a volunteer-based initiative, HARASSmap aims to end the social acceptability of sexual harassment and assault in Egypt. In addition to its interactive mapping service and community outreach service, HARASSmap offers self-defence classes and community education for both men and women.

== How it works ==
When someone experiences or is a witness to an incidence of sexual harassment, they can fill out an online report or send the report via SMS, e-mail, Twitter or Facebook including the details of the incident as well as address, street name and public points of interest. HARASSmap then verifies the reports and places them on a Google map of Egypt, which localises sexual harassment hotspots. The map will show red dots where incidences of sexual harassment have taken place.

HARASSmap volunteers visit the areas where incidences have occurred to raise awareness about what constitutes sexual harassment and to work towards ending it. By meeting with local shop owners, police officers, doormen and other public venues, the HARASSmap team is working to mobilize them to make their neighbourhoods "harassment-free zones".

== Awards and grants ==
HARASSmap won the 2011 World Summit Youth Award and the 2012 Deutsche Welle Best of the Blogs Award for 'Best Use of Technology for Social Good' and is now an incubated social enterprise at Nahdey El Mahrousa. Since HARASSmap's inception, they have been approached by activists from 25 countries for help adopting similar initiatives. In 2012, the International Development Research Centre (IDRC) of Canada offered HARASSmap a grant to continue study sexual harassment in Egypt based on reports submitted by participants and gather information on the methodological issues in the collection and use of crowd sourced data.

== See also ==
- Egyptian Centre for Women's Rights
- Feminism in Egypt
- Gender inequality in Egypt
- Judiciary of Egypt
- Operation Anti Sexual Harassment
- Rape in Egypt
- Women in Egypt
- 678 (film)
