= The Girl in the Blue Bra =

2011 photograph of an Egyptian woman being abused

- Part of the Egyptian Crisis (2011–2014)
- Completion date: 17 December 2011; 14 years ago
- Type: Photograph
- Subject: Unidentified
- Location: Tahrir Square, Cairo, Egypt; 30°02′40″N 31°14′09″E

The Girl in the Blue Bra (Arabic: الفتاة ذات حمالة الصدر الزرقاء) is an iconic photograph of a female protester being beaten by anti-riot security forces at Tahrir Square in Cairo, Egypt, on 17 December 2011. The woman, whose identity is not known with certainty, had been participating in a demonstration against the Supreme Council of the Armed Forces in the aftermath of the 25 January Revolution, which ousted Egyptian president Hosni Mubarak and his government.

While running away from a group of soldiers who were charging the crowd, the woman fell to the ground and was subsequently dragged by two soldiers and stomped on by another, causing her abaya to ride up and reveal her bare torso and blue bra, for which the photograph is named. The image gained notoriety after being circulated by prominent media networks around the world, leading to widespread outrage among Egyptians and condemnation from international organizations and governments.

== Background ==
Civil unrest had spread across Egypt due to much dissatisfaction with President Mubarak’s corrupt regime. Citizens protested by participating in demonstrations, marches, occupations, and civil disobedience in a national effort to overthrow Hosni Mubarak from the presidency. Many of the Egyptian grievances revolved around economic and political issues including unemployment, police brutality, political freedom, civil liberty, and food-price inflation. The use of mass media was instrumental into organizing collective action as people were able to utilize online social-networks to mobilize towards Tahrir Square. Such a strategy caught Mubarak’s regime by surprise, and therefore he was unable to efficiently contain or provide any successful counter strategy towards this social movement. On January 25, 2011, thousands gathered in Cairo and other Egyptian cities in opposition of the regime. Clashes between civilians and security forces unfolded in an attempt to halt the movement as some 840 people were killed, while over 6,000 were injured.

After a few weeks of continued protests and demonstrations, Vice President Omar Suleiman announced that Hosni Mubarak had resigned from the presidency, and would transfer state-control to the Supreme Council of the Armed Forces (SCAF). However, there were still many who were unsatisfied with the conditions and the obtainment of the government by the party of the SCAF. Many demanded for election reform, an end to the state of emergency, and for power to be returned to civilians. This sparked much outrage and controversy among Egyptian citizens. Therefore, this state of discontent led to a second wave of protests in Tahrir Square in December that same year.

== Events of the photograph ==
On December 17, 2011, many Egyptians occupied the Tahrir Square in order to protest and express their frustrations with the SCAF regime. However, the protests were met with resistance from the army, as civilians were beaten and arrested in an attempt by the regime to dispel the protests.

A video recorded from an aerial view then emerged of a woman trying to flee from the Square in a street adjacent to the Egyptian Cabinet, only to stumble and fall to the ground. The security forces caught up to her and beat her severely. The soldiers began stomping her and hitting her with their batons. As they began dragging her away, her abaya fell from her body, revealing her stomach, jeans, and bra. The soldiers continued to stomp her body, though she seemed to be unconscious.

=== Victim's identity ===
The victim's name has been undisclosed, and therefore she cannot be properly identified. However, Reuters and Human Rights Watch reported that the victim was a 28-year-old activist called Ghada Kamal Abdel Khaleq, a member of the April 6 Youth Movement. During her detention afterward, she was physically and verbally abused by an officer who also made sexual threats against her. Following her release, she revealed to the local press what occurred to her and other detainees instead of going home.

== Reaction ==
Following the publication of the video, many were morally outraged and disturbed by the actions of the SCAF. Popular media platforms such as CNN, NPR, and RT had all covered the event and video, resulting in a large viewing of, "The Girl in the Blue Bra". On December 20, 2011, thousands of activists gathered in Tahrir Square to condemn the actions of the military and the SCAF. Some observers claim that the protest consisted of one of the largest participation by women in a demonstration in recent years. Recognized political leaders such as Hillary Clinton criticized the attacks on protesters and labeled the actions of the military as a degrading to women, the revolution, and Egypt. In response to Clinton's remarks, Mohamed Kamal Amr, Egypt's Foreign Minister, proclaimed that Egypt accepts no interference in its affairs. However, the SCAF later apologized to women for its actions asserted their respect for women and their rights.

=== Significance ===
Police have been known to beat civilians, but to overtly beat an unarmed female in public signifies that it could happen to anyone. Graffiti and painted images of the Blue Bra have been prominent on the walls of Cairo. It symbolizes the social suffering of a nation, as other issues such as opposition to violence, military-rule, censorship, and stripping of people are all personal experiences of activists. Others contend that, "The Girl in the Blue Bra" identifies that women's bodies are subject to moral, cultural, and political views. Further, they claim that the presence of women protesting in Tahrir Square for democracy and social justice may undermine state control and patriarchal values.

== See also ==
- Human rights in Egypt
  - Under the Supreme Council of the Armed Forces
- Women's rights in Egypt
  - Mass sexual assault in Egypt
