= Egyptian Streets =

English Egyptian news organization

- Website type: News website
- Available in: English
- Editors: Mohamed Khairat; Co-founders: Mohamed Khairat; Mostafa Amin
- Website: Official website
- Launched: July 2012

Egyptian Streets is an English language independent news website and organization founded in July 2012 by Egyptian journalist Mohamed Khairat as a blog, but later developed into a media company in March 2014. It claims to be the number one English media outlet in Egypt by reach. In February 2015, more than 800,000 visited the website.

The website tries to bring attention to cultural, social and environmental issues in Egypt, such as sexual harassment and the campaigns aimed at stopping it, through collaborations with a number of non-governmental organizations and movements. Its readers mostly consist of both bilingual Egyptians and non-Egyptians who either live in Egypt or abroad.

== Content ==
The stated goal of Egyptian Streets is to provide its readers with "an alternate depiction of events that occur on Egyptian and Middle Eastern streets" and particularly aims to cover a wide range of topics and stories related to Egypt in a neutral manner. It also managed to establish a social platform to discuss the various articles it publishes. Some of the issues it brought up are considered controversial and sensitive topics in Egypt and garnered significant attention from the readers, such as the debate of whether women in hijab should be banned from entering bars or not. Egyptian Streets works to tackle even more challenging problems in Egyptian society such as sexual harassment and mass sexual assault and has a special coverage of protest movements, most notably the 2012–13 protests against the Muslim Brotherhood.

In June 2014, Egyptian Streets published an article about a video that appeared on YouTube depicting a naked and injured woman who was sexually assaulted in Cairo's Tahrir Square when thousands took to there to celebrate President Abdel Fattah el-Sisi's inauguration. Various media organizations and news networks such as The Huffington Post, La Stampa, Spiegel Online and Daily Mirror among others have cited this article, along with several other publications about sexual harassment and issues related to women in Egypt, including an article about an iPhone video called "Creepers on the Bridge" that portrays the challenges a woman faces while walking the streets of Egypt.

In March 2017, Egyptian Streets secured an investment round from and partnered with Speakol, a smart ads platform with more than 600 clients that employs artificial intelligence to provide users with tailored ads.

In 2020, Egyptian Streets coverage focused heavily on the women's movement, which included in-depth coverage of the ABZ case, the Fairmont Nile City hotel gang rape case, and other coverage of sexual violence and women's rights in Egypt. Egyptian Streets also launched its mobile application in November 2020, available on iOS devices and Android devices.

== Collaborations ==
Egyptian Streets has collaborated with or supported a number of non-governmental organizations and grassroots movements in order to raise awareness and to promote social change and actions on a variety of issues, including the environment (Earth Hour being an example), sexual harassment, animal rights, education, poverty and more.

It managed to engage in a media partnership with Egypt's first Corporate Travel Market exhibition and participated with a number of local and international organizations operating in Egypt in order to promote them, including AIESEC, the United Nations Development Programme, which launched Get Online Week in Egypt, as well as Cairo's Goethe-Institut to promote their program for Egypt's educational system. It has also promoted campaigns aimed at stopping sexual violence against women, such as those of Dignity Without Borders and Heya, an initiative that is mainly aimed at empowering the role of Egypt's women in society.

== Audience ==
Its audience primarily consists of English-speaking Egyptians, some of whom live abroad, as well as non-Egyptians from countries such as the United States and Australia among others, who are either interested in the cultural and touristic aspects of Egypt or reside in the country. 41% of the readers are aged between 18 and 34 and they also consist of both genders, with 51% of them being male and 49% female.

Egyptian Streets claims to be the number one independent English media outlet in Egypt by reach, with an average number of 600,000 monthly visitors. The number reached more than 800,000 in February 2015.

== Recognition ==
In January 2018, Egyptian Streets' founders Mohamed Khairat and Mostafa Amin were selected among Forbes Europe 30 Under 30 in Media & Marketing for "defining and driving the world of news and content". In March 2018, Khairat and Amin were also named in the first ever Arab 30 Under 30 list by Forbes Middle East for innovation and transformation of the rules of business.
