= Online Centres Network =

The Online Centres Network is a UK-based network which helps communities tackle social and digital exclusion.

Good Things Foundation coordinates the Online Centres Network of 5,000 community partners, who provide free or low-cost access to computers and the internet. The organisation also provide training and support to hundreds of volunteers, centre staff and community leaders, helping them to work within their own communities.

Over 2 million people have been helped to improve their skills through the Online Centres Network to date, with many learners also going on to further learning and increased employment opportunities.

In 2011 the management of the Online Centres Network (then known as UK online centres) was taken over by Good Things Foundation (formerly known as Tinder Foundation), a staff-owned mutual and social enterprise formed by the Sheffield-based team previously managing the UK online centres contract on behalf of Ufi Ltd. In July 2013, Online Centres Foundation became known as Tinder Foundation. Tinder Foundation officially received charity status in early 2016. In November 2016 Tinder Foundation rebranded as Good Things Foundation.

Good Things Foundation Chief Executive, Helen Milner, was inducted into the BIMA Digital Hall of Fame in 2012 alongside Sir Tim Berners Lee, Stephen Fry, and others noted for their work in the digital arena.

== Online learning ==
In April 2011, Good Things Foundation (then known as Online Centres Foundation) launched a brand new learning platform Go ON, which was renamed Learn My Way in 2012 (http://www.learnmyway.com/). The website was developed by Good Things Foundation with the aim of bringing together all of the resources on the market for internet beginners, including those developed specifically by Good Things Foundation, and from other providers including the BBC and Digital Unite.

The new website contains four main sections:

Get ready, to tackle basic literacy and numeracy skills before tackling any online skills.

Get started, which includes fun engagement resources to help get first time learners started.

Online basics, the course that was developed in conjunction with BIS and Becta to provide learners with all of the skills they need to get started with computers and the internet.

Learn more, which includes a number of popular courses including Facebook and socialising online, Shopping online and Using a computer.

What next, which contains resources to help learners progress, including details on volunteering opportunities.

myguide, the original learning platform which was developed by Online Centres Foundation ceased to exist in September 2011. The most popular courses that existed on myguide have been moved across to the new learning platform.

== Get Online Week ==
Get Online Week is an annual national campaign run by Good Things Foundation throughout the Online Centres Network, which helps tens of thousands of people to improve their computer and internet skills each year.

Get Online Week has been going since 2007, when the organisation then known as UK online centres first marked out a date in October to bring digital inclusion to national attention. Since then the campaign has grown into a week-long annual celebration, with thousands of events taking place each year in centres and more unusual locations, bringing digital skills and know-how to everyone.

Past Get Online Week partners and sponsors have included, Lloyds Banking Group, the BBC, Go ON UK, Post Offices, BT, Three Mobile, Google, Sky, and Facebook.

== Digital inclusion statistics ==
There are currently 12.6 million people who lack basic digital skills and 5.9 million who have never used the internet before. These people are likely to be socially excluded as well as lacking in online skills. Good Things Foundation and the Online Centres Network, along with their partners, are aiming to combat this digital and social exclusion.
