= Bushra (Egyptian actress) =

Egyptian actress

- بشري
- Born: Bushra Rozza; 5 October 1981 (age 44); Cambridge, England
- Occupations: Actress, singer
- Years active: 2002–present
- Spouse(s): Amr Raslan (m. 2010; div. 2015) Salem Heikal (m. 2020; div. 2023) Khaled Hamida (m. 2024; div. 2025)
- Children: 2

Bushra Rozza (Arabic: بشرى رزة; known professionally as Bushra; born October 5, 1981), is an Egyptian actress and singer. She earned the Best Actress award at the Dubai International Film Festival for her role in 678.

== Early life ==
Bushra was born in Cambridge, England, to Egyptian writer Ahmed Abdalla Rozza, and a mother who worked as a human development consultant concerned with women's rights. She moved to Cairo, Egypt when she was 8 years old.

== Career ==
Bushra began her career as a broadcaster on satellite television and then moved to acting in 2002. Her first role was on the sitcom Shabab Online (Youth Online). She then worked in a variety of roles in both comedy and drama productions. She won an award for her 2004 film Alexandria... New York, directed by Youssef Chahine. She has released musical albums, including Makanak (Your Place) and Ehki (Talk), and also the music video Cobra, which criticized actor Mohamed Ramadan.

Bushra is also the founder of El Gouna Film Festival, a festival that was established to promote cultural interaction. On the issue of sexual harassment, she has said "politicians alone do not create change. It is high time for us actors and filmmakers to also participate."

== Personal life ==
Bushra was married to Syrian engineer and businessman Amr Raslan, with whom she has two children, from 2010 to 2015. She later married her childhood friend Salem Heikal, who proposed during the 2020 El Gouna Film Festival. The couple separated in May 2023. In the summer of 2024, she entered into a third marriage with Khaled Hamida, though the relationship ended in separation a year later.

=== Age controversy ===
Several sources stated that she was born in 1976, but she later mentioned that she was born in the 1980s. Her official Facebook account stated 5 October as her birth date, and other sources reported 1981.

== Selected filmography ==
=== Films ===
- Alexandria... New York (2004)
- Grandpa Darling (2007)
- 678 (2010)
- Mr. & Mrs. Ewis (2012)

=== TV series ===
- Hidden Worlds (2018)

== Discography ==
- Tabat & Nabat (2005)
- Cobra (2018)
