= Azza Soliman =

Egyptian lawyer and women's rights activist

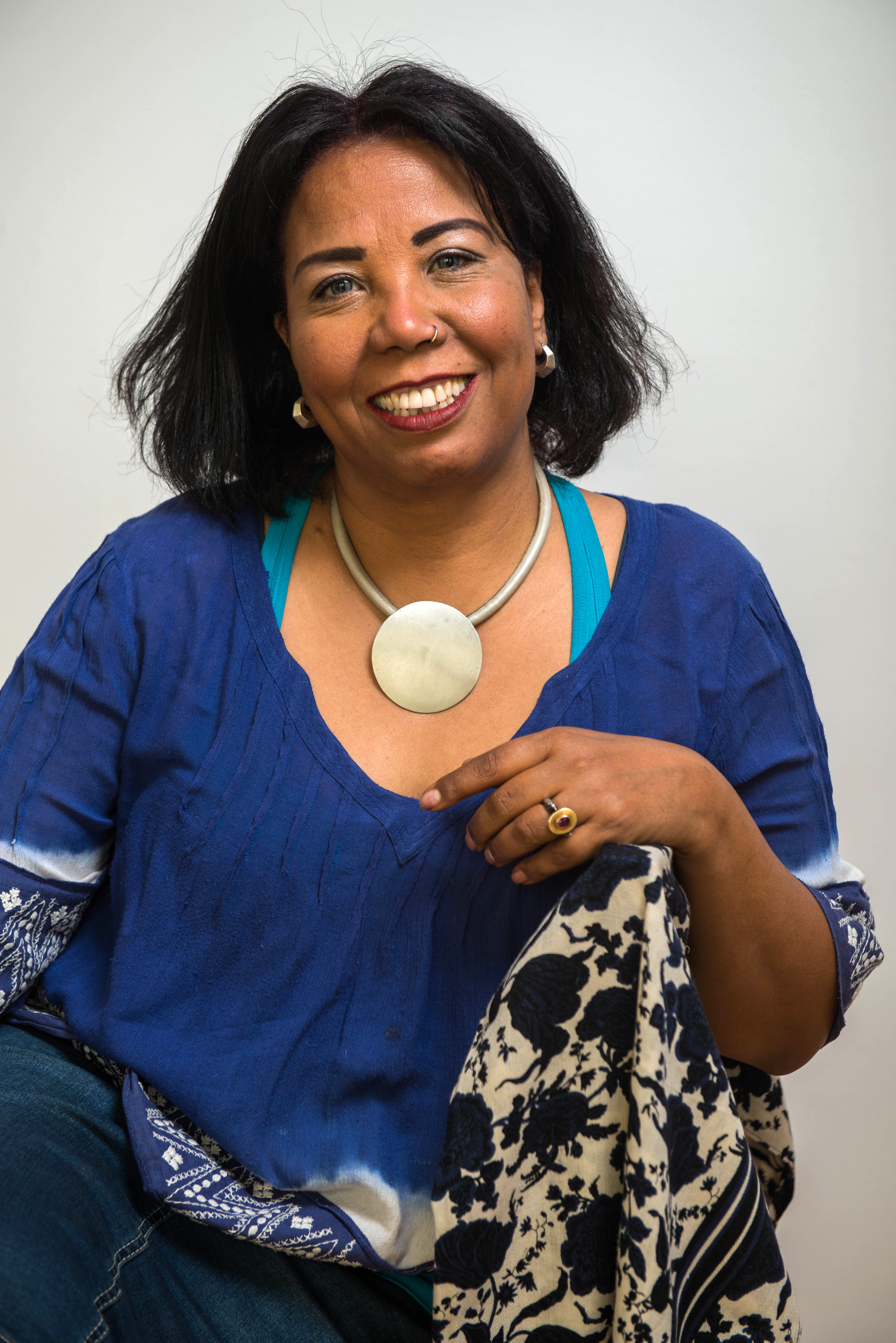
Azza Soliman taken by: Rene Clement

Azza Soliman (Arabic: عزة سليمان; born 1966) is an Egyptian lawyer and women's rights activist. She co-founded the Centre for Egyptian Women's Legal Assistance (CEWLA), an organization that campaigns for the equality of women, with an emphases on legal equity and the amendment of discriminatory laws. She has been arrested and prosecuted several times. in 2015, she testified about the death of a protester, Shaimaa al-Sabbagh (who was killed by the Egyptian police). Soliman has been subject to retaliation, including financial measures.

Soliman is part of Amnesty International's Brave Campaign, which calls for the recognition and protection of human right's defenders around the world.

== Biography ==
Born in 1966, in a family of five sisters and three brothers, Soliman was encouraged by her father to study. She became a lawyer and an activist for human rights in Egypt. In 1995, she founded the Centre for Egyptian Women's Legal Assistance (CEWLA). From 1997, CEWLA implemented training and legal awareness programs on the issue of gender equality. This non-governmental organization also conducts studies and organizes communications on topics such as violence against women, honour killings, female genital mutilation, the khul (a procedure through which a woman can divorce her husband in Islam), legal interpretations of sharia law, etc.

In the 2010s, the social and political situation in Egypt evolved rapidly following the Egyptian revolution of 2011. Soliman was critical of the difficulty faced by women wanting to participate in the protests happening in the streets and squares. She spoke out about the harassment women were victims of within the uprising.

In January 2015, while on the terrace of a café, Soliman witnesses an attack by masked policemen on a peaceful protest commemorating the fourth anniversary of the uprising of 25 January 2011 ("The Day of Anger"). She witnessed a protester, Shaimaa al-Sabbagh, shot to death by the police. Following this tragedy, Soliman voluntarily went to the Office of the Prosecutor to testify to the death of Shaimaa El Sabbagh during the dispersal of the demonstration by the police. She underlined the responsibility of the police, and lodged a complaint against the Minister of the Interior and the security forces. The prosecutor questioned her and informed her that a complaint had been lodged against her and four other witnesses for "illegal meeting" and "participation in a public security demonstration", despite her not having participated in the demonstration. On 23 March 2015, she was formally charged, along with sixteen others, with "unauthorized protest" and "breach of security and public order". On 23 May 2015, the Court discharged the charges against them, a judgment confirmed in October of the same year by the Court of Appeal, the Crown having appealed the first decision.

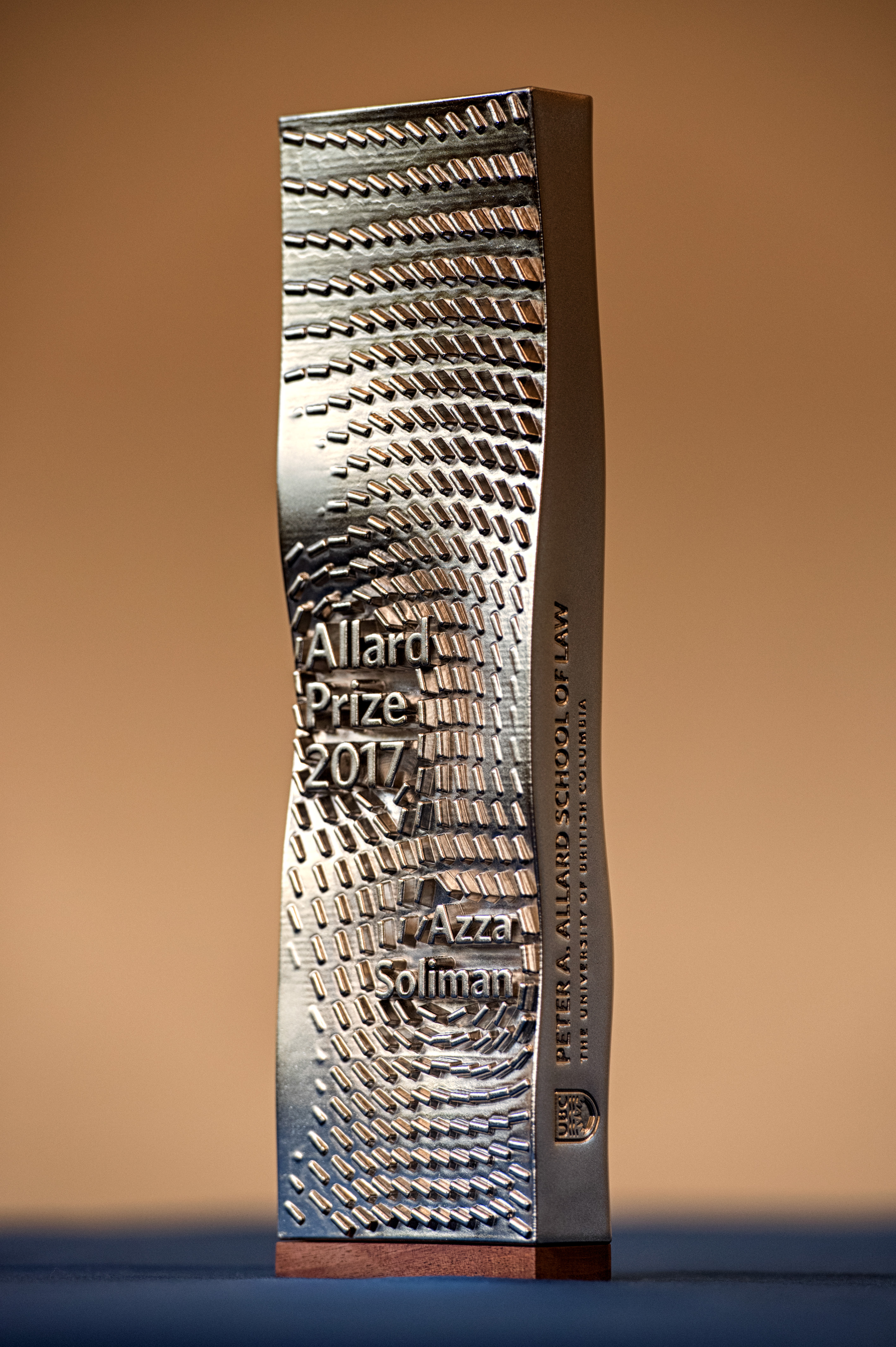
The Allard Prize awarded to Soliman in 2017

On 19 November 2016, a new set of retaliatory measures started against her. While she was on her way to Jordan to participate in 'Musawah', a global movement for equality and justice in the Muslim family, led by feminists "seeking to reclaim Islam and the Koran for themselves", the airport police stopped Soliman from leaving the country.

Shortly after, her bank froze her accounts as well as those of her law firm. Two weeks later, in early December, she was arrested by the police, taken to the police station and then to the office of an examining magistrate for interrogation. She was accused of falling under a new law on non-governmental organizations (NGOs), prohibiting NGOs from receive grants from abroad. These charges were confirmed by a court on 14 December 2016, and Soliman was prohibition from leaving the country and her assets frozen. A solidarity movement was organized to support her.

The Allard Prize for "exceptional courage and leadership in combating corruption or protecting human rights" was awarded to Khadija Ismayilova in 2017. Soliman was a finalist and received an honourable mention.
