= Mass sexual assault in Egypt =

Sexual assault of many women in Egypt

- Local terms: Arabic: تحرش (taharrush; harassment); تحرش جنسي (taharrush jinsi; sexual harassment); تحرش جماعي (taḥarrush jamāʿī; lit: collective harassment; Egyptian pronunciation taḥarrush gamāʿī or gama'ei)
- Activism: HARASSmap, Operation Anti Sexual Harassment
- Related: Sexual assault, sexual violence, gang rape

Mass sexual assault is a widespread issue in Egypt and has been the subject of significant international attention since 2005, (Note: Amnesty International, 2015: "The phenomenon of mob attacks was first documented in May 2005, when groups of men were reportedly hired by the authorities to attack women journalists taking part in a protest calling for the boycott of a referendum on constitutional reform. Since November 2012, mob sexual assaults, including rape, have become a regular feature of protests in the vicinity of Tahrir Square in Cairo.") when Egyptian security forces and their agents were accused of using it as a weapon against female protesters during a political demonstration at Tahrir Square in Cairo on 25 May of that year. It has since become increasingly prevalent, and by 2012, it had become commonplace for crowds of young men to sexually assault or rape women during festivals and political protests throughout the country.

Testimonies on these mass sexual assaults revealed a general pattern in how they are conducted: a smaller group of men would encircle a woman, while a larger group of men would form an outer ring to physically deter anyone who attempted to intervene; the isolated woman would then be abused and groped while being stripped of her clothes and vaginally or anally penetrated with fingers or handheld objects. The attacks, which have been described as the "circle of hell" by activists, (Note: Amnesty International, 2015: "Activists have called the attacks 'the circle of hell', referring to how the mob drags the woman or girl into the centre of the group while attacking her." Patrick Kingsley, The Guardian, 2013: "'We call it the circle of hell,' said Bahgat, who herself narrowly escaped assault this week." Yasmine Fathi, Al-Ahram, 2013: "During the attacks [in Cairo], the women often find themselves trapped inside what some have called 'the circle of hell,' a mob of 200 or 300 men who fought with one another to pull, shove, beat and strip them.) have been extensively documented by Egyptian women's rights organizations, Amnesty International, and the United Nations.

Commentators say the attacks reflect a misogynistic attitude among Egyptian society that penalizes women for leaving the house, seeks to terrorize them out of public life, and views sexual violence as a source of shame for the victim, not the attacker. Sexual assault has been used as a weapon against female protesters in 2005 and since July 2012, although the perpetrators are not exclusively politically motivated.

== Background ==
Sexual harassment was barely discussed in Egypt before 2006. The Egyptian Center for Women's Rights sought to draw attention to it, but the public's response was that it was an American idea wrongly applied to Egyptian society. (Note: From the start, ECWR [Egyptian Centre for Women's Rights] referred to the phenomenon of sexual harassment as el-taharruah el-ginsy, which was met with confusion, embarrassment, anger, and most often denial. Salient elements of public feedback at the time were that taḥarrush did not exist in Egypt and that it was an American concept that could not be directly applied in the Egyptian context.")

Mass sexual assault was first documented during the Egyptian constitutional referendum on 25 May 2005, on what became known as "Black Wednesday", when women demonstrators were sexually assaulted by a group of agents provocateurs, groups of men who had arrived on buses, as police watched and did nothing to intervene. (Note: Al Akhbar, 2012: "[T]here are indications that the practice of sexual harassment originated from the authorities themselves ... In May 2005, the police recruited paid gangs to sexually harass women taking part in marches in downtown Cairo. ... The human rights groups asserted that 'the assaults against women in the demonstrations happened under the watchful eyes of uniformed security officers, and often on their direct orders.' After this incident, sexual harassment spread across the country like wildfire." Al-Nabā News referred to the 2005 attacks as taharrush and hatk ʾarḍ (هتك عرض; indecent assault, lit. violation of honour).)

The issue attracted more discussion following the Eid al-Fitr holiday in 2006, when on 24 October a crowd of young men who had been denied entry to a cinema in Cairo engaged in a five-hour-long mass sexual assault of women in Talaat Harb Street. Police were reported to have done nothing to stop it, although many bystanders tried to help the women.

The attacks gained prominence outside Egypt in February 2011 when Lara Logan, a correspondent for the American network CBS, was sexually assaulted by hundreds of men in Tahrir Square, Cairo, while reporting on the 2011 Egyptian Revolution. By 2012, according to Al Akhbar, such attacks had become a "prominent feature" of religious festivals in Egypt.

== Description ==
=== Attacks ===
Videos

Tahrir Square subway attack,
30 June 2013
Tahrir Square attack,
25 January 2013
Eid al-Adha attack,
(women visible from c. 0:32 mins)
January 2006 (Note: Filmed by Sherif Sadek, Akhnaton Films. Sameer Padania, Global Voices Online, 2006: "[I]n January 2006, on Eid al Adha, film-maker Sherif Sadek was back in Cairo, when he heard a commotion on the street outside his downtown apartment. Sherif grabbed his camera and leaned out the window to film the video presented below. "Initially it's a little difficult to tell what is going on in the video – there are crowds in the middle of the street, which looks unusual – but after about 25 seconds, you will see two or three men leading four or five girls down the street past the building from which Sherif is filming. The crowd behind them is extremely large, a couple of hundred strong, and soon surrounds the girls (around 1'20). They then pass down a side-street, partially out of view, which gives Sherif time to spot a man in uniform – a police officer? – looking down the street at the commotion, who then gets back in his vehicle (1'50). Sections of the crowd then come running back round the corner, although it's not clear whether they have the girls with them or not.")

Amnesty International described a series of attacks that took place on January 25, 2013, against protesters in the vicinity of Tahrir Square. The victims of these attacks said they typically lasted from a few minutes to over an hour, and that the men were usually in their 20s and 30s. Victims were aged seven to 70.

Describing the Tahrir Square attacks, women said they were often separated from friends by the crowd, or out alone, and encircled by a large group of men who groped their breasts, genitals and buttocks. Attempts were made to pull or cut their clothes off, and their bodies were pulled in different directions as men moved them through the crowd. Women regularly report digital penetration of the vagina and anus. Attackers have used sticks, knives and blades, and in several cases sharp objects have been inserted into the victim's vagina.

One student protester described how a group of men formed a ring around her in Tahrir Square on 25 January 2013:

The last thing I heard was "don't worry," followed by screaming ... At first they tried to rip my bag out of my hands; I then felt hands all over my body, tearing down my trousers and long jacket; they were undoing its clips. ... They pulled my trousers and pants down, but couldn't get them all the way down because I was wearing boots that they couldn't manage to get off ... I felt hands touch me from all directions, and I was moved, almost carried, inside the circle as people continued saying: "don't worry." They were saying that while violating me ...

Perpetrators regularly claim to be helping the women when in fact they are attacking them, which increases the difficulty for rescuers and leaves the women not knowing whom to trust. Women testify to having heard attackers say: "Do not be afraid; I'm protecting you," or "you are like my sister, do not be afraid." People genuinely trying to help find themselves being beaten and sexually assaulted too.

Volunteer groups in Cairo, including OpAntiSH (Operation Anti Sexual Harassment), organize "extraction teams" who push into the circles wearing padded clothing, helmets and gloves, and get the women out. Other OpAntiSH teams carry spare clothes and medical supplies, operate a hotline so that the extraction teams know where to go, and offer counselling and legal and medical help. They were called to 19 incidents on 25 January 2013 alone, and were able to respond to 15 of them.

Rescuers have described how assailants have set up makeshift tea stands in the crowd; in one case boiling water from a tea stand was thrown over rescuers who had formed a protective ring around a woman. During an attack in Cairo in 2013, the attackers allowed an ambulance to leave with the victim only when the driver told them she was dead.

=== Reasons ===
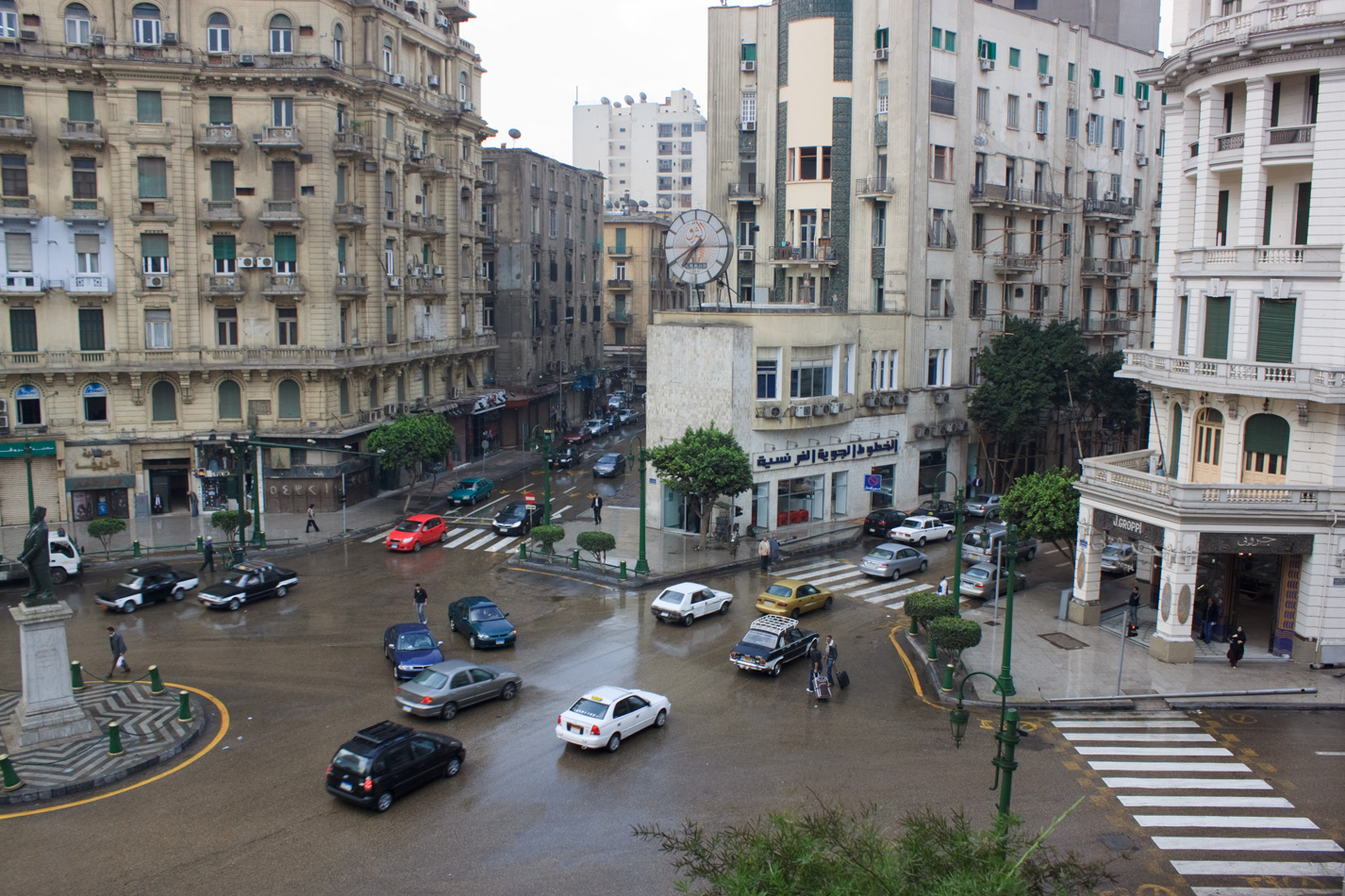
Talaat Harb Street, Cairo, where a crowd of men engaged in a five-hour-long attack on women in October 2006

Mariz Tadros of the Institute of Development Studies notes that "social"—that is, non-politically motivated—sexual assault in Egypt is a result of diverse motives, including pleasure, a desire to dominate women, and a "perceived sense of sexual deprivation" because marriage may be financially prohibitive. Journalist Shereen El Feki, author of Sex and the Citadel (2013), writing about sexual harassment in general (taharrush jinsi), blamed unemployment, social media and a "breakdown of family surveillance" because of overworked parents.

In one survey 60 percent of the highest educated women in Egypt blamed the victims (of general sexual harassment) and "provocative" clothing, as did 75 percent of the least educated women.

In a 2013 UN survey, 75.7% of women who had been sexually harassed said it occurred while they were wearing conservative clothing without makeup. When asked about causes, female respondents cited "foreign pornographic programs" (97.2%), "non-enforcement of the religious principles" (95.5%) and "non-compliance of girls with religious values with regard to appearance" (94.3%). Male respondents cited "wearing tight clothes" (96.3%) and that the women "do not conform to religious ethics with regard to their appearance" (97.5%).

Nehad Abu Komsan, head of the Egyptian Center for Women's Rights, argues that sexual harassment is a symptom of the country's political and economic oppression, and that men are "lashing out at those next down the line in the patriarchy." Hussein el Shafie of OpAntiSH has argued that the attacks are like a "tear-gas bomb" to get women off the streets – not sexual but stemming from a sense of entitlement. According to a 2013 paper by Nazra for Feminist Studies:

[A] general attitude of sexual entitlement prevails, that is, a belief that the bodies of women present in the context of demonstrations are safe territories for sexual attacks underlies nearly all testimonies. With testimonies that speak of hundreds of hands persistently raping women, with hundreds more watching the brutal attacks, some while even smiling, it becomes clear that we are faced with an overwhelming challenge, namely a state and a society that have internalized sexual violence against women as the law of the land.

=== Prevalence ===
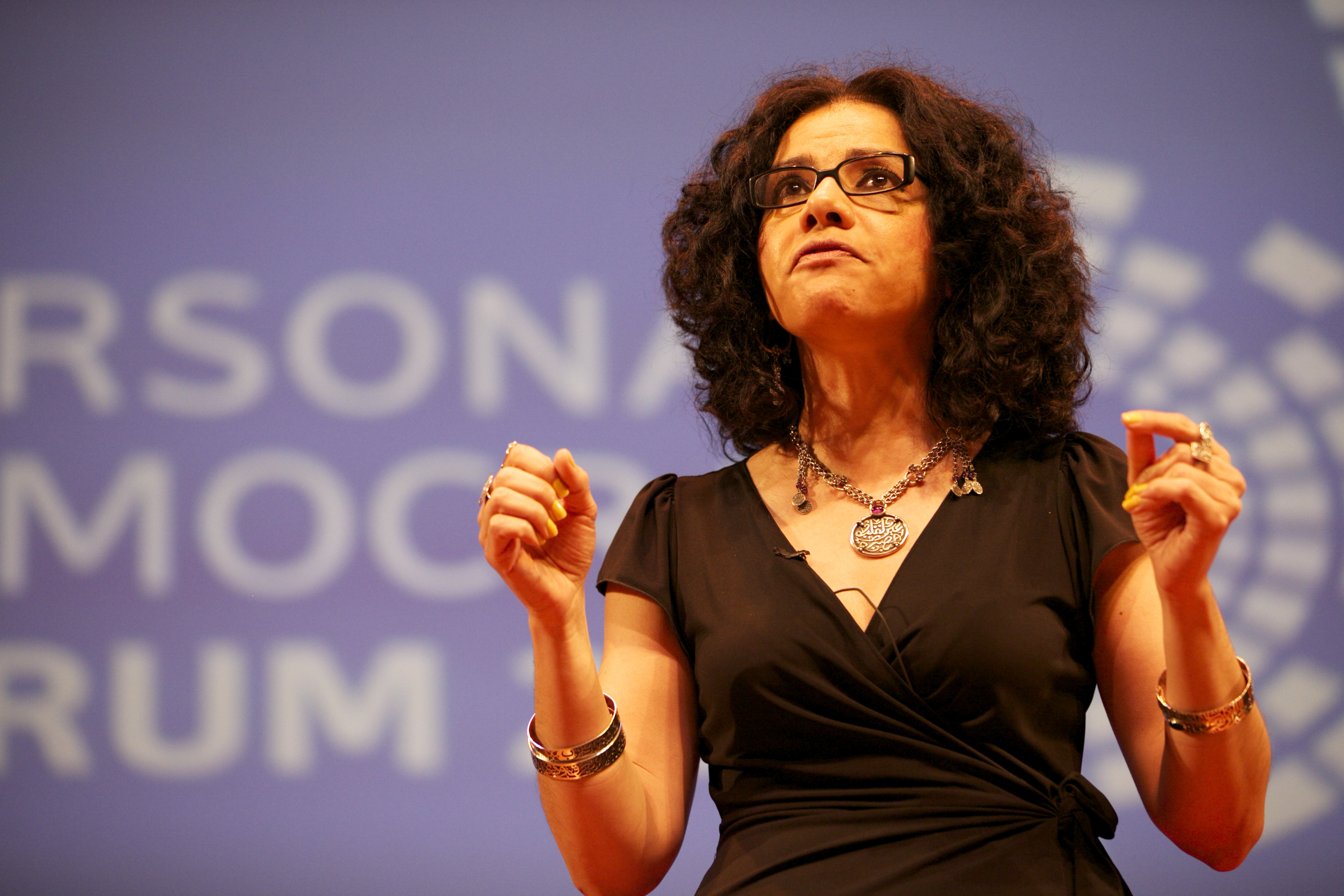
Egyptian journalist Mona Eltahawy, who was attacked in Cairo in November 2011

According to a 2008 survey by the Egyptian Center for Women's Rights, 83% of Egyptian women said they had experienced sexual harassment, as did 98% of women from overseas while in Egypt. A 2013 study in Egypt by UN Women found that 99.3% of female respondents said they had been sexually harassed.

The first jail sentence in Egypt for sexual harassment came in 2008 after a man molested a woman in the street from his car. Following this, two films – Scheherazade, Tell Me a Story (Yousry Nasrallah, 2009) and 678 (Muhammad Diyab, 2010) – brought the issue of sexual assault to cinemas.

The mass sexual assaults have been on the increase since the fall of Hosni Mubarak on 11 February 2011, the end of the 2011 revolution, particularly during protests in Tahrir Square and religious festivals.

According to Serena Hollmeyer Taylor and other researchers at the Fletcher School of Law and Diplomacy, the revolution saw a drop in complaints of harassment. Citing HARASSmap, which offers an interactive mapping service to which harassment can be reported, they write that 82 reports of sexual harassment were received between 7 and 25 January 2011. This is in contrast with the eight received between 25 January, the day of the first protests, and 11 February, when Mubarak stepped down. Taylor et al. call this Egypt's "liminal moment", following the anthropologist Victor Turner's idea that, during political upheaval, people are liberated from their "cultural script". During those 18 days, a protester told them, men put aside their differences with women, and everyone was simply Egyptian.

After the fall of Mubarak, there was rapid escalation, beginning with the attacks, on the night he stepped down, on Egyptian journalist Mona Eltahawy and South African journalist Lara Logan. Logan, a correspondent for CBS, was sexually assaulted for 30 minutes by around 200 men in Tahrir Square before being rescued by a group of Egyptian women and soldiers. Several more journalists were among the hundreds of women who experienced mass sexual assault over the following few years: French journalist Caroline Sinz in November 2011; British journalist Natasha Smith in June 2012; Egyptian journalist Hania Moheeb on 25 January 2013, along with 18 other women; and a Dutch journalist in June 2013.

Five hundred cases of mass sexual assault were documented between June 2012 and June 2014. An anti-harassment group, I Saw Harassment, reported four cases on 8 June 2014 alone, during President Abdel Fattah el-Sisi's inaugural celebrations, while Operation Anti-Sexual Harassment reported ten. The New York Times wrote of the celebrations:

At times, the prevalence of sexual violence in the crowds was hard even for the official state television network to hide. Female screams interrupted the broadcast of a nationalistic poet reciting from a stage ... when the screams grew louder, another man seized the microphone, yelling: 'Young men, please move away from the girls! Men, young men, get back!'"

=== Video evidence ===
External image

Girl in the Blue Bra,
Tahrir Square, December 2011
Egyptian president visits a victim,
June 2014

From 2011 onwards, footage of women being assaulted began to appear regularly on social media, including one of a woman in Alexandria in 2011 being dragged along the ground and hoisted onto men's shoulders.

The Girl in the Blue Bra video (Sit al Banat) in December 2011 showed a woman partially covered by an abaya being beaten, stomped on and dragged around by the military in Tahrir Square. A man is similarly attacked during the same video. Thousands of women took to the streets to protest.

A video taken on 8 June 2014, also in Tahrir Square, showed a naked woman being sexually assaulted during inaugural celebrations for President Abdel Fattah el-Sisi. A volunteer for I Saw Harassment said hundreds of people were grabbing at the woman and that it took the police 20 minutes to get her out of the crowd. Seven men aged 15–49 were arrested. After the president visited the woman in hospital, the Egyptian government asked YouTube to remove the video; a spokesman said the request had come from the woman. YouTube responded by removing copies in which the victim could be identified.

== Counter-movement ==
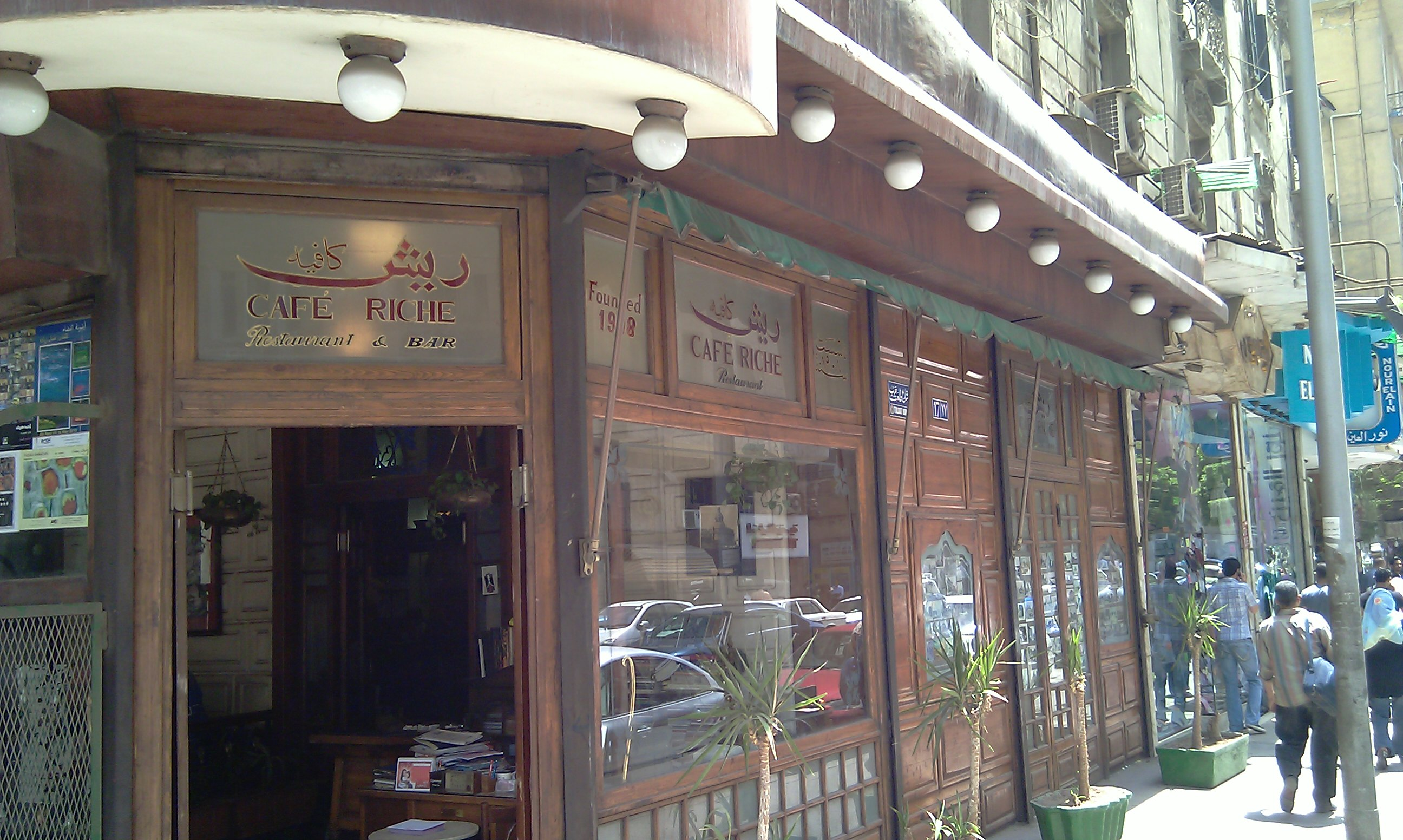
Café Riche, Cairo, a meeting point in January 2013 for women who decided to speak out about sexual assault

The period saw the growth of a counter-movement of NGOs and women's groups. After the particularly high number of assaults on 25 January 2013, women met that night at Café Riche on Talaat Harb Street, near Tahrir Square, and decided to start telling their stories. Journalist and broadcaster Lamis Elhadidy devoted an entire programme to the assaults and apologized for not having covered them sooner.

A first attempt to change the law, supported by Amr Hamzawy, failed. The ruling party maintained that women participating in rallies were personally responsible for such incidents.

In March 2013, the Muslim Brotherhood opposed the United Nations Declaration on the Elimination of Violence Against Women, arguing that it would lead to the "disintegration of society." The law was changed after a female law student at the Cairo University College of Law was sexually assaulted by a large group of men on campus in March 2014, and had to be escorted to safety by security guards.

Egyptian Streets called the attention that followed the 2014 Cairo hotel gang rape case a #MeToo moment. The 2014 Fairmont hotel gangrape concerned a young woman who had been drugged and raped by a group of young men from wealthy families. The case attracted wide social media and mainstream media attention, leading to the extradition of three of the accused men from Lebanon back to Egypt in September 2020.

== Comparisons to attacks outside Egypt ==
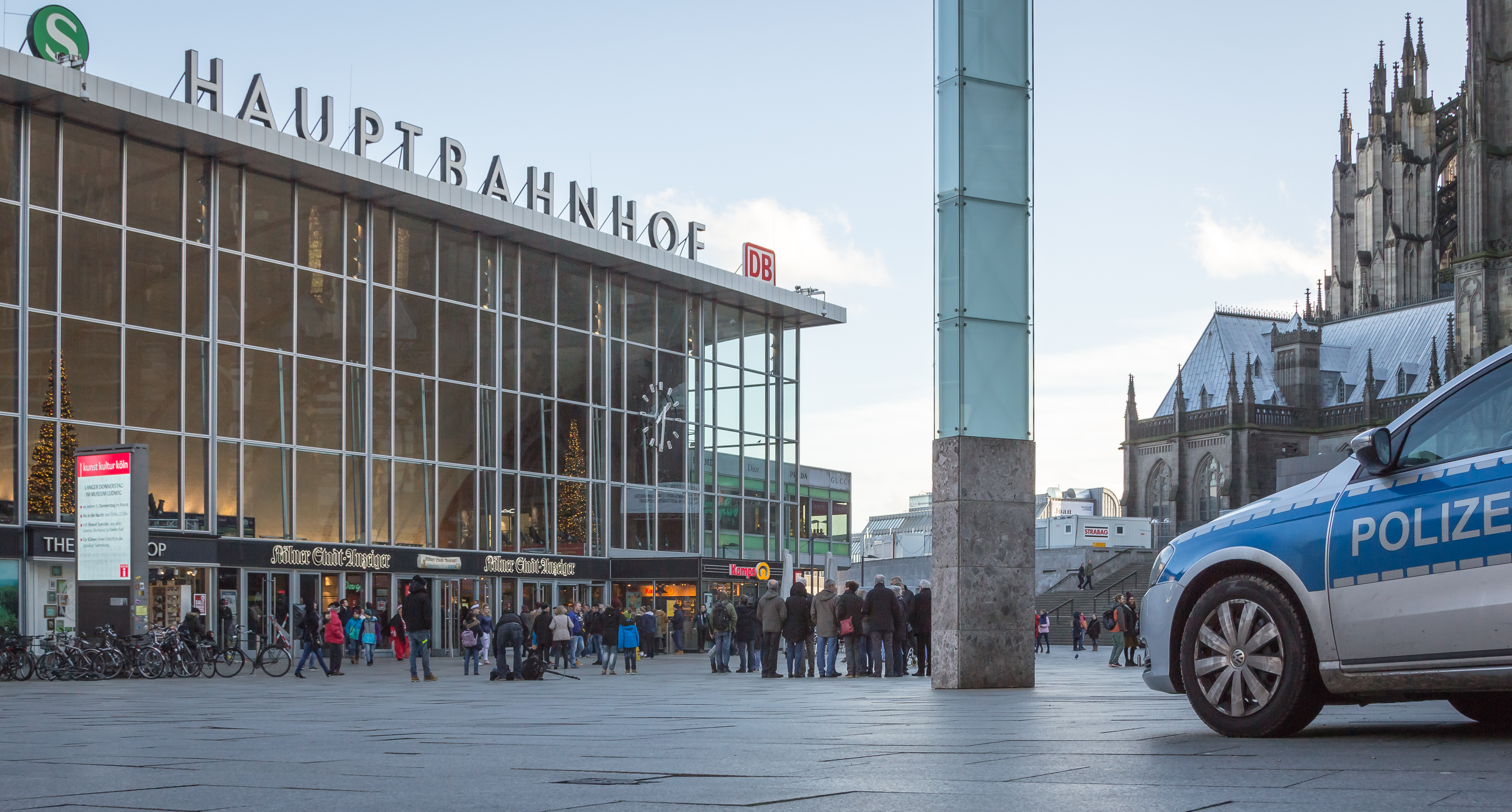
Cologne's main train station, where hundreds of women reported sexual assaults on New Year's Eve 2016

The attacks in Egypt, and the term taharrush ("harassment" in Arabic), came to wider attention in 2016 when women in Europe reported having been sexually assaulted by groups of North African men during New Year's Eve celebrations. German police compared the attacks to the mass sexual assaults in Egypt.

Most of the attacks took place in Cologne, Germany, where 359 women filed sexual-assault complaints but women also filed complaints in Berlin, Düsseldorf, Frankfurt, Hamburg and Stuttgart; Salzburg, Austria; Helsinki, Finland; Kalmar and Malmö, Sweden; and Zurich, Switzerland. The news coverage prompted allegations that similar attacks had taken place in Stockholm in 2014 and 2015 during We Are Sthlm, a music festival for teenagers, but were covered up.

According to a German local government report, the German federal police compared the attacks to "taharrush gamea (collective sexual harassment in crowds)", a practice they said existed in African countries, as reported by the media during the Egyptian revolution. The transliteration, taharrush gamea, followed the Egyptian pronunciation, taḥarrush gamāʿī (with a hard ⟨g⟩), rather than the standard pronunciation, taḥarrush jamāʿī. On 10 January 2016 the German newspaper Die Welt published an article under the headline "The phenomenon 'taharrush gamea' has arrived in Germany". Writing in the Spectator, Dan Hitchens said that mass sexual assault was a feature of Egypt, rather than of the Arab world, and that linking it to the attacks in Europe was "over-excited".

== See also ==
- 678 (film)
- Women in Arab societies
- Rape in Egypt
