= Good Things Foundation =

British registered charity

- Formation: 2010 (16 years ago)
- Headquarters: Sheffield, United Kingdom
- Group CEO: Helen Milner
- Chair: Liz Williams
- Website: https://www.goodthingsfoundation.org

Good Things Foundation is a registered charity based in the UK, the objective of which is to make the benefits of digital technology more accessible. It manages the Online Centres Network, the Learn My Way learning platform, and the National Databank.

The charity was originally known as Online Centres Foundation before rebranding as Tinder Foundation in 2013. A further rebrand, to Good Things Foundation, took place in November 2016. Good Things Foundation's chief executive is Helen Milner OBE.

== History ==
Originally known as Online Centres Foundation, the charity was established in December 2011 to manage the UK online centres contract, taking on the network on from learndirect (then Ufi Ltd).

In July 2013, the company rebranded as Tinder Foundation. In November 2016, they rebranded once more as Good Things Foundation, partially to avoid confusion with dating application Tinder.

== Operations ==
Since founding, Good Things Foundation has managed the Online Centres Network – providing support to community organisations teaching digital skills through a learning platform, called Learn My Way. The charity adopted a new strategy in 2022, establishing a 'National Databank' which provides free access to mobile connectivity data for people on low incomes.

== Funding ==
Good Things Foundation receives funding from a mixture of public, private and third sectors, including Virgin Media O2, Vodafone, and Nominet UK. The charity has worked closely with government departments, and currently works with regional authorities including the Greater London Authority and the Greater Manchester Combined Authority.

== People ==
=== CEO ===
- Helen Milner (2011–present)

=== Chair ===
- Lord Jim Knight (2011–2016)
- Liz Williams (2016–present)
