= Get Online Week =

Get Online Week is an annual campaign that takes place in the UK and Europe.

== UK ==
In 2007, UK online centres first marked out a date in October to bring digital inclusion to national attention. Since then the campaign has grown into a week-long annual celebration, with thousands of events taking place each year in centres and more unusual locations, bringing digital skills and know-how to everyone.

The 2010 event took place on 18–24 October 2010. In 2014, Get Online week took place on 13–19 October, with 1,103 locations running 5,000 events, with 80,000 participants. In 2015, the campaign took place on 12–18 October, organised by Tinder Foundation. It claims to be the biggest UK digital inclusion campaign.

It is organised by Tinder Foundation a UK-based charity.

2013 was the 7th annual October event from UK online centres. Previously 'Get online week' was called 'Get online day' but the decision was made to change the name for 2010 and stretch the campaign over a week. This was due to the natural growth of the campaign and previous feedback that a day wasn't enough time to fit in all the activities that were arranged. Typically, Get online week's many events and promotional activities now happen throughout the whole month of October.

UK online centres teamed up with a range of external partners who generated huge amounts of publicity for Get online week. They include the BBC, BT, Three, Post Office, TalkTalk, Facebook, EE and MLA amongst many others. Partners also hold their own events or direct people to one of the 3,800 UK online centres which are situated around England.

== Europe ==
The first European Get Online Day took place on 4 March 2010. It was inspired by the UK event, and it later became an annual campaign lasting a week, run by Telecentre Europe.

Date	Notes	References
4 March 2010		
28 Feb-5 March 2011		
26–30 March 2012		
18–24 March 2013		
24–30 March 2014		

The European Get Online Week was inspired by the campaign with the same name run by UK online centres (now Tinder Foundation) in the UK. Telecentre Europe extended it to the European level, to get new computer users online by helping them to get through the doors of their local ICT learning centres, enabling the staff to build people's confidence to move on into a more structured learning. Since its take-off in 2010, the Get Online Week campaign has reached more than 600.000 Europeans in more than 20.000 learning centres across Europe. Thanks to the campaign, more than 100.000 people have used the Internet for the very first time.
