= Engy Ghozlan =

Social activist and journalist

- Born: 1985 (age 40–41); Cairo, Egypt
- Education: Cairo University
- Occupations: Social activist and journalist
- Years active: 2005–present
- Known for: Action against sexual harassment of women in Egypt

Engy Ayman Ghozlan (Arabic: إنجي أيمن غزلان ; born 1985) is a social activist and journalist who highlights problems of sexual harassment of women in the streets of Egypt. Starting in 2005, she was a project manager at the NGO known as the Egyptian Center for Women's Rights (ECWR) and actively pursued efforts to make Egypt safe for women. She is known as the "voice and face" of efforts to eradicate sexual harassment of women in Egypt.

Ghozlan is also the co-founder of HarassMap, established in 2010, a voluntary organization that uses digital and online technology to report incidents of sexual harassment of women in Egypt. After the initial launch of HarassMap through ECWR, Ghozlan and her co-founder, Rebecca Chiao, left ECWR to run HarassMap independently.

== Biography ==
Engy Ghozlan was born in Cairo in 1985. She attended Cairo University, earning a bachelor's degree in mass communication in 2007. She personally underwent the trauma of sexual harassment silently, but then took action to address the issue. She then joined the Egyptian Center for Women's Rights, which was spearheading the campaign against sexual harassment of women.

In 2005 the ECWR piloted a study to collect data on the scope of the issue. The survey, which covered 2,800 women in Cairo and in five other Egyptian governorates (provinces), revealed that 33% of women faced sexual harassment on a daily basis which they did not report, as they feared the societal values in Egypt would not support them. The survey also showed that some women blamed themselves for such harassment. Sexual harassment was defined as "inappropriate touching" (40% of respondents) and "verbal taunts" (30% of all respondents). A follow-up survey of men showed that two-thirds of respondents "admitted to routinely harassing women". ECWR has pursued the passage of anti-harassment laws, but HarassMap was of the opinion that existing laws were not implemented properly.

During 2008 Ghozlan engaged in a widespread media campaign called "Making Egypt's Streets Safe for All". She gave interviews online, on television, and in newspapers to bring awareness of what constitutes sexual harassment to the Egyptian public, as the country lacks a "clear, legal definition" of the term. She is known for her forthrightness, as she replied to a Middle East Online interviewer who quoted the Ministry of Interior statistic that 20,000 women are raped annually in Egypt that the figure was more likely 200,000, as most attacks are not reported.

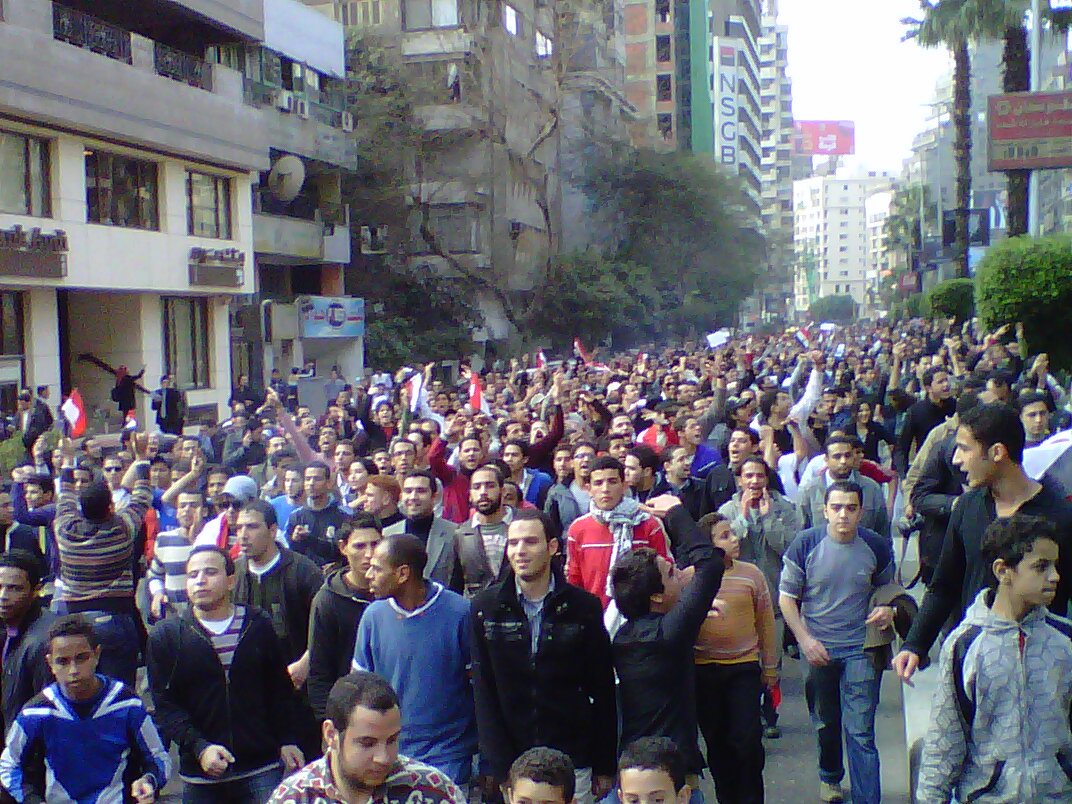
The "Day of Revolt", 25 January 2011, at Tahrir Square

Ghozlan took an active part in Cairo's Tahrir Square Revolution in 2011. This social media (Facebook) inspired event drew participants from all over Egypt, and a large number of women also participated in the demonstrations to overthrow Hosni Mubarak, then-president of Egypt. Ghozland reported no interaction between the men and the women in the days leading up to Mubarak stepping down from power, as everyone slept in tents in the square. However, after Mubarak left office, many of the women participants at Tahrir square were sexually assaulted by a group of men who told them "to go home where they belong". Because of these incidents, Ghozlan feels that the social problems of Egypt have not changed as a result of the revolution. In an interview with the BBC News, she narrated the incidents of sexual harassment they faced as: "around 100 religious extremists were screaming at us to get out of Tahrir and started to chase us out. It was really chaotic ... In the revolution we were all united and we all wanted the system to go, but our social behaviour hasn't changed". According to Ghozlan, there were 19 mob attacks on women at Tahrir Square on 25 January 2011. Commenting on the Delhi rape issues of 2012 and their impact in Egypt, she observed: "...how a group of men could come together and decide that in this public place where they're in a bus like the Delhi rape, or in the square like in Cairo, that they will rape this woman in public and run away with this mob mentality thinking that, impunity, there is no punishment, they can run away with it".

Ghozlan also works for the German International Cooperation on its Promotion of Women's Rights project, in association with 11 NGOS of the Network for Women's Rights Organizations on subjects of legal reforms and harassment of women. She continues to work for HarassMap on its community outreach program. She is represented in several "Egyptian young feminists coalitions".
