= Gehad Hamdy =

Egyptian dentist and feminist activist

- Education: October University for Modern Sciences and Arts
- Occupations: Dentist, activist
- Known for: Speak Up organization
- Awards: BBC 100 Women (2022)

Gehad Hamdy is an Egyptian dentist and feminist activist working against gender based violence. She was named as one of the BBC 100 Women in 2022. She founded Speak Up and is one of the leaders of Connecting Humanity.

Hamdy received a Bachelor of Dental Surgery from October University for Modern Sciences and Arts.

== Career ==
=== Dentistry ===
Hamdy worked as a dentist since 2018 alongside her activism.

=== Speak Up ===
Hamdy founded Speak Up in 2020, a feminist initiative that works through social networks to identify aggressors of gender violence, sexual harassment and rape. Speak Up encourages women to speak out about harassment, provide legal and emotional support. It also pressures authorities to prosecute and change laws, and highlights narratives of rape culture in the media. Speak Up was involved in the criminalization of Female Genital Mutilation in Egypt in March 2021 and the prosecution of Michael Fahmy for sexually assaulting 6 girls.

=== Speak Up Helpline ===
In 2024, Hamdy launched Speak Up Helpline, the first online helpline in Egypt, it is a digital reporting and support tool for individuals—particularly women—facing online violence, blackmail, harassment, and Technology-facilitated gender-based violence. The helpline enables users to report harmful content on platforms such as Facebook, Instagram, WhatsApp, and TikTok. Speak Up acts as a trusted escalation partner with Meta, TikTok, YouTube, and Aylo helping victims remove abusive content and access digital safety guidance, legal information, and psychological referrals. The helpline receives hundreds of messages daily and represents a core part of Speak Up’s direct support strategy.

=== Cultural Recognition ===
In 2025, Gehad Hamdy was featured in the Horniman Museum’s London exhibition “All Eyes on Her!”, which spotlights eight Egyptian women using creative and activist tools to challenge social norms in Egypt. Her work with Speak Up is highlighted in the “Resist” section of the bilingual show, celebrating her role in combating gender-based violence and advocating for women’s rights in Egypt.

=== Connecting Humanity ===
Hamdy is one of the leaders of Connecting Humanity, an activist collective which provides internet access to people in Gaza using donated eSIMs, allowing them to connect to networks outside of Gaza.

=== Judging ===
In 2026, Gehad served as a judge for the Stevie Awards for Women in Business.

== Awards ==
- BBC 100 list of "inspiring and influential women", 2022
- Gold Award Winner: Social Change Maker of the Year in Gender by The Stevie Awards, 2022
- Finalist for the Equal Rights and Non-Discrimination award at the World Justice Forum, 2022
- Finalist for Aidex Humanitarian Hero Award, 2022
- The Changemaker and The Humanitarian awards by Women SME Leaders Awards by Entrepreneur Middle East and Mastercard, 2022
- International Humanitarian award by Women4Africa, 2021
- Finalist for the Women Empowerment Award by Africa Women Innovation & Entrepreneurship Forum (AWIEF), 2021
- Speak Up, in 2025, the organization founded by Hamdy, received a Special Mention in the French Republic’s Human Rights Prize from the Commission nationale consultative des droits de l'homme (CNCDH). The 2025 prize focused on combating child trafficking and exploitation.
