= 2014 Cairo hotel gang rape case =

2014 crime in Egypt

In April 2014, an alleged gang rape took place at the luxury Fairmont Nile City hotel in Cairo, Egypt in which a girl was drugged and raped by a group of young men from wealthy families. The allegations did not appear until July 2020.

The perpetrators are alleged to have signed the first letter of their names on the victim's body, recorded the crime on video, and sent the video to their friends.

== Events before the incident revealed ==
Social media users in Egypt sparked controversy several times in 2020 over many cases related to harassment and rape, following which the judicial authorities moved to encourage victims to submit reports to the Public Prosecution. Among those cases was what was known as the case of Ahmed Bassam Zaki, in which several Egyptian girls said that they were harassed and raped by him, after which the authorities arrested him and the Public Prosecution opened an investigation into the accusations and an Egyptian court ordered his imprisonment pending the investigations.

Egyptian actresses and users of social network sites during that period published details of many incidents of harassment. Many liken the campaign against harassment in Egypt to the one known as the #MeToo campaign, which exposed unethical practices against women in several countries.

The Egyptian Parliament's Legislative Committee agreed to amend the Criminal Procedure Law to include a proposal submitted by the government to ensure the confidentiality of victims' data in crimes related to harassment when these victims go to report those crimes. In an attempt to overcome Egyptian social norms regarding complaints of sexual assault.

== Incident details ==
According to the testimonies circulated, the incident dates back to February 2014. At the afterparty of the famous 'Tea Dance' party at Fairmont Nile City hotel, a group of young men belonging to wealthy families, slipped GHB (the date rape drug) in a young woman's drink, gang raped her unconscious body, drawing and signing their initials on her body. They also propped her around the hotel room, placing shampoo bottles on her, treating her like an inanimate object. They proudly video taped the entire crime and proudly circulated it for years by email.

The men involved in the crime are: Amr Faris Komy, Amr Hussein & Khaled Mahmoud (brothers), Omar Hafez, and Ahmed Toulan (who slipped the drug in her drink) and Amr Sedawy (her close friend at the time who was behind the camera).

== Social media outrage ==
In July 2020, the Instagram page that successfully broadcast the testimonies against Ahmed Bassam Zaki, resulting in his arrest, started alluding to a video-taped gang rape crime that happened in February 2014, asking people to turn in the video evidence for it. Over the following few days, people on social media began to slowly give details of the actual crime this was referring to. After all, this had been widely circulated. More details came out about this being a serial crime for these men, and that they had done this quite frequently over the past 10 years, and that there were many more men involved.

After one full month of this social media outbreak, the public was getting frustrated about why these men had not been arrested yet. Word had already spread that most of them had fled the country. On August 24, 2020, the Egyptian prosecution officially announced the wanted arrest of 9 men involved in the Fairmont crime (including 3 men involved in a related gang rape crime). A few days later, it was reported that a few of the witnesses in the case were also detained.

== Investigation details ==
While on the search for the Fairmont video, another video was found of another gang rape crime, where 3 men of the same extended circle of rapists drugged and raped a young woman in the North Coast. The three men involved were Amir Zayed, Youssef Korra and Sherif Komy (the brother of Amr Komy, one of the Fairmont rapists). This case has already been moved to the courts for trial (September 13, 2021). Amir Zayed was caught while trying to flee the country, while Youssef Korra and Sherif Komy had successfully fled. Sherif Komy is suspected to be in London, United Kingdom with his brother, where there is no extradition treaty to Egypt.

After 10 months of the Fairmont scandal erupting, the case was temporarily paused, the accused rapists were let go, and the email created by the prosecution asking the public to send the video evidence of the crime to was officially closed down. If new evidence comes to light, the case will be reopened. Activists are still actively looking for the video.

The witnesses that were detained remain under a travel ban, as their cases are still open. Amir Zayed is currently the only one of the 9 accused rapists that is still in custody.

== Timeline of events ==
- The first weeks of July 2020: The users of social networking sites were demanding an investigation into an alleged story that sparked widespread controversy during the sexual assault of a number of young people on a girl in the Fairmont Hotel, six years after its occurrence. According to accounts on social media, young Egyptians belonging to wealthy families lured one of the girls during a party at the "Fairmont Nile City" hotel to a hotel room after they put a drug in her drink, then took turns raping her and filmed the incident.
- July 31, 2020: The Fairmont Hotel announced its commitment to assist the authorities and the competent authorities authorized if an official investigation is opened and to continue to provide its absolute support in this regard, declaring its sympathy for anyone who may have been affected by this "painful incident," according to their description.
- August 4, 2020: The Egyptian Public Prosecution received a letter from the National Council for Women, accompanied by a complaint submitted by one of the girls to the Council about some people sexually assaulting her during 2014 inside the "Fairmont Nile City" hotel in Cairo.
- August 5, 2020: The Egyptian Attorney General orders an investigation into the sexual assaults at the "Fairmont Nile City Hotel".
- August 24, 2020: The Egyptian Public Prosecution orders the arrest and bringing of those accused of trespassing on a girl at the Fairmont Hotel, placing them on the travel ban lists and awaiting arrival for interrogation regarding what is attributed to them.
- August 25, 2020: Security sources announced that some of the accused in the "Fairmont" case had fled the country as soon as the investigation began.
- August 26, 2020: The prosecution clarifies the details and date of the escape of 7 defendants in the Fairmont case outside the country: “Two of the defendants left the country on July 27, 2020, and four others followed the next day, and the last of them left on July 29, 2020.”
- August 27, 2020: The first accused in the case was arrested while trying to flee outside the country, and it was found that he was accused in an incident similar to that of the Fairmont girl case. His name was also revealed, and the Public Prosecution ordered his imprisonment for four days pending investigations.
- August 28, 2020: Security forces arrest the second accused in the case while he was in the northern coast of Egypt, and the prosecution orders his detention pending investigations.
- August 29, 2020: Lebanon detains 3 Egyptians accused of their involvement in the alleged gang rape in Cairo.
- August 30, 2020: Lawyer and human rights defender Azza Soliman claimed that most of the witnesses in the case were arrested, or were kidnapped in a strange way.
- August 31, 2020: The Public Prosecution ordered the detention of three defendants for four days in custody, including the daughter of a famous artist in Egypt, and the release of three others if each of them paid a financial guarantee of one hundred thousand pounds, and another with a guarantee of his place of residence, pending investigation of incidents in which they were accused on the occasion of The ongoing investigations into the incident of assaulting a girl in the Fairmont Hotel. Thus, the number of defendants in what is known as the Fairmont case reached 16, the number of whom were detained pending investigation inside Egypt, in addition to three suspects who were arrested by the Public Security Forces in Lebanon.
- September 10, 2020: Egyptian lawyer Mohamed El-Sayed filed a report with the investigation authorities, accusing the victim of gang rape in the "Fairmont" case of drug abuse and incitement to immorality and whoring.
- September 11, 2020: Human Rights Watch condemned what was happening against the witnesses of the "Fairmont" case in Egypt, describing it as "arrest and defamation," and demanded that the charges against six people who had testified in the case be dropped, stressing the need to protect all who testified and to be tried from It appears that he was involved in the alleged incident. People who are close to the arrested witnesses said that the authorities leaked private photos of them that were on their phones after they searched them, and two men underwent anal examinations and a woman underwent a virginity examination, practices that violate medical ethics and are internationally condemned as insulting and may amount to torture.
- September 24, 2020: Interpol extradited three of the men suspected in the gang rape from Lebanon back to Egypt for trial.
- May 11, 2021: The Egyptian public prosecutors released four suspects in the rape case due to insufficient evidence supporting the nine-month investigation. The public prosecutor stated that 39 people were interviewed regarding the case. Nevertheless, their testimonies were conflicting and led to difficulty in gathering evidence supporting the six-year-old case. Egyptians took to social media platforms to express their frustration against the decision.

== See also ==
- Feminism in Egypt
- Mass sexual assault in Egypt
