= 678 (film) =

2010 Egyptian film

- Theatrical release poster
- Directed by: Mohamed Diab
- Written by: Mohamed Diab
- Produced by: Sarah Goher
- Starring: Bushra; Nelly Karim; Maged El Kedwany; Bassem Samara; Sawsan Badr; Ahmed El-Fishawy
- Cinematography: Ahmed Gabr
- Edited by: Amr Salah
- Music by: Hany Adel
- Production company: New Century Production
- Distributed by: Renaissance Egypt Company (2010) (Egypt, theatrical); Global Film Initiative (2012) (US, all media)
- Release dates: December 12, 2010 (Dubai); December 20, 2010 (Egypt)
- Country: Egypt
- Language: Egyptian Arabic

678 (released internationally as Cairo 6,7,8) is a 2010 Egyptian political thriller film written and directed by Mohamed Diab. The film focuses on the daily public sexual harassment of three women of different social backgrounds in Egypt.

== Plot ==
Low-income government employee Fayza is sexually assaulted on her way home from work, first in a taxi and then a bus. At home, she resists her husband's attempts to be intimate. She attends a free weekly self-defence class, but instructor Seba forces her to leave because she denies being sexually harassed due to shame. On her way home, Nasr attempts to grope Fayza and she defends herself with a pin from her hijab, causing her to be removed from the bus.

After attending a football game, Seba is separated from her physician husband in the crowd and sexually assaulted. Her husband becomes distant due to guilt while her mother discourages her from reporting the assault due to shame and the likelihood that her attackers would not be prosecuted. The next morning she has a miscarriage and separates from her husband due to lack of emotional support.

Nelly Roushdy is a young stand-up comedian. At a show, her fiancé Omar belittles her and turns the largely male audience against her. During her day job at a call centre, she is verbally harassed by a customer. Later, while crossing a street to visit her mother, a driver grabs her through his truck window, gropes her, and drags her alongside his vehicle. Aided by witnesses, she pulls the driver from the truck and delivers him to the police. The police attempt to persuade them to file assault charges instead of sexual harassment, eventually acquiescing only due to Omar's insistence. It is the first sexual harassment lawsuit in Egypt. While Nelly is interviewed on television, she is congratulated by a female caller while a male caller victim blames and slut-shames her. Omar supports Nelly but their families encourage her to drop the lawsuit, believing that it will harm their reputations.

On Fayza's next bus trip, she is attacked by Nasr again and stabs him in the groin before leaving the bus. Police detective Essam investigates the incident and accuses Nasr of groping. Fayza's husband confronts her about their lack of intimacy but she won't admit to the reason. Fayza stabs another assaulter on the street. The media begin to report a mysterious vigilante who targets molesters, and Fayza becomes more comfortable riding the bus. Seba's self-defence course has grown and moved to a venue that hosts comedy shows, bringing the three women into contact. They plan another attack but the opportunity doesn't present itself.

Essam identifies Fayza as a suspect and summons the three women to the police station. He tells them that Fayza will receive a life sentence if he arrests her, but believes that this will inspire other women to commit copycat crimes. He releases them with a warning.

Fayza begins walking to work. Her husband gives her flowers but she continues to rebuke his attempts at romance. Seba is harassed by a young boy who she catches and assaults. She tells her husband that she wants a divorce, revealing that she had a miscarriage and blaming him. Essam's wife dies in childbirth. Nelly tells Seba and Fayza that she will take responsibility for the stabbings. As they argue, Fayza gets angry and blames the other women for not wearing hijabs and appearing promiscuous. Seba says that this is backward thinking and cuts her long hair. Nelly tells the story of her assault at her next comedy show. On a bus, Fayza witnesses a woman being assaulted and does not intervene. Seba sees a man groping a woman and attacks him with a razor blade – Fayza confronts the man, her husband, over what he had done. Seba confesses to Essam but he releases her as no complaint was made.

At the hearing for Nelly's sexual assault lawsuit, Omar responds to the judge by shouting from the gallery that she will not drop her case. Essam, Seba and Fayza are also there, and the film ends with Seba and Fayza making peace.

== Cast ==
- Bushra as Fayza
- Nelly Karim as Seba
- Maged El Kedwany as Essam
- Nahed El Sebai as Nelly
- Bassem Samra as Adel
- Ahmed El-Fishawy as Sherif
- Omar El Saeed as Omar
- Sawsan Badr as Nelly's mother
- Yara Goubran as Amina
- Marwa Mahran as Magda
- Moataz Al-Demerdash as himself

== Reception ==
At the 2010 Dubai International Film Festival (DIFF), the Muhr (young horse) Arab award for Best Actress was won by Bushra and Best Actor was won by Maged El Kidwaany for their roles in the film.

The film won the Audience Award at the 2012 African Film Festival of Cordoba, and Best Narrative Feature at the 2012 Heartland Film Festival.

== Controversies ==
Controversies around the film include a threatened lawsuit by Egyptian pop singer Tamer Hosny for the film's use of his song, as he did not wish it associated with the subject matter.

Attorney Abdel Hamid Shabaan made an attempt to block the film's exhibition at DIFF due to its "poor portrayal" of Egypt. The filmmaker denied any intention to defame Egypt, as he believes the issues narrated in the film are universal.

Mahmoud Hanfy Mahmoud of the Association for Human Rights and Social Justice requested that the film be banned as potentially inciting women to injure men's genitals with sharp tools, but filmmakers argued that it did not encourage but merely documented the practice of some women carrying such tools for self-defence.

== See also ==
- Mass sexual assault in Egypt
- Rape in Egypt
