= Rafat =

Rafat or RAFAT may refer to:

== Places ==
- Rafat, Jerusalem, Palestinian town in Jerusalem Governorate
- Rafat, Salfit, Palestinian town in Salfit Governorate
- Dayr Rafat, depopulated Palestinian village west of Jerusalem
  - Deir Rafat, a monastery near the depopulated village

== Other ==
- Rafat (name), including people named Raafat, or Rafaat
- Royal Air Force Aerobatic Team, acronymed RAFAT.

== See also ==
- Refaat
- Rifat
