= Adel Hussein =

Egyptian journalist and political activist

- Born: January 1, 1932
- Died: January 1, 2001 (aged 69)
- Citizenship: Egypt
- Occupations: Journalist; Writer

Adel Hussein (1932–2001) was an Egyptian journalist and oppositional political activist, who moved from Marxism to Islamism.

== Life ==
The youngest brother of Ahmed Hussein, founder of the Young Egypt Party, Hussein became an anti-British activist early and was imprisoned for communist student activism from 1953 to 1956. Graduating in science from Cairo University in 1957, he was imprisoned again from 1959 to 1964.

On release from jail, Hussein became a journalist, joining the newspaper Akhbar el-Yom. Forced into an administrative job for his opposition to President El-Sadat in 1973, he embarked upon a period of scholarly research which resulted in three books: The Egyptian Economy, Towards a New Arab Thought (1981), and Normalisation (1984).

Joining the Socialist Labour Party in 1984, he drove the party towards a hybrid of Marxist anti-imperialism and Islamist emphasis on Shari'a. He edited the party newspaper, Al-Shaab from 1985 to 1993, allowing the leaders of the banned Muslim Brotherhood to write for it. At the party congress in May 1993, Adel Hussein was elected the Labour Party's General Secretary, and gave up the editorship of Al-Sha'ab to his nephew Magdi Hussein.

On 24 December 1994, Hussein was arrested in Cairo on his return from a trip to France, and held in solitary confinement in Tora Prison. One week after his arrest, a reason was provided: al Jama'a al-Islamiya leaflets with his handwriting on had apparently been found under his plane seat. After continuing protest at his imprisonment, he was released on 18 January 1995.

== Works ==
- 'Islam and Marxism: The absurd polarisation of contemporary Egyptian politics', Review of Middle East Studies, Issue 2, 1976
- Al-Iqtisad al-Misri min al-Istiqlal lil-Taba'iyya [The Egyptian Economy: from independence to dependency, 1974-1979], 2 vols., Cairo: Dar al-Mustaqbal al-'Arabiya, 1982. (In Arabic)
- Towards a New Arab Thought: Nasserism, development and democracy. Cairo: Al-Mustaqbal al-'Arabī, 1985. (In Arabic)
- Normalisation: the Zionist plan for economic hegemony, Institute of Palestinian Studies, 1984. (In Arabic)
- 'La normalisation économique entre l'Égypte et Israêl', Revue d'études palestiniennes, Spring 1985, No. 15, pp. 69–92
- 'Bias in Western Schools of Social Thought: Our Heritage as the Starting Point for Development', in Abdelwahab M. Elmessiri, ed. (2006). Bias: Epistemological Bias in the Physical and Social Sciences. IIIT. pp. 77–104. ISBN 978-1-56564-416-8.
