= Misr Al-Fatah =

Misr Al-Fatah may refer to:

- Young Egypt Party, established in 1989
- Young Egypt Party (1933), established in 1933, and dissolved in 1953
