= Misr El-Fatah =

Misr El-Fatah may refer to one of the following political parties in Egypt:

- Young Egypt Party, established in 1989
- Young Egypt Party (1933), active from 1933 to 1953)
