= Misr Al-Fattah =

Misr Al-Fattah may refer to:

The Young Egypt Party or the Young Egypt Party from the 1930s
