= Rafat (name) =

Rafat, Raafat, or Rafaat is a given name and a surname. Notable people with the name include:

== Given name ==
- Raafat Attia
- Raafat Mohammad
- Rafaat Khalil
- Rafat Albadr
- Rafat Al-Akhali
- Rafat Bayat
- Rafat Bazoo
- Rafat Hashempour
- Rafat Hussain
- Rafat Saeed Qureshi

== Surname ==
- Darius Rafat, Canadian music producer, composer, bandleader, music agent, and entrepreneur
- Ismail Rafaat (1912–2004), Egyptian footballer
- Payan Rafat, Iranian footballer and coach
- Taufiq Rafat, Pakistani poet
- Taqi Rafat, Iranian poet, playwright, critic, and journalist

== See also ==
- Refaat
- Rifat, given name and surname
- Rahat (disambiguation)
- Rafati
