= Misr al-Fattah =

Misr al-Fattah may refer to:

The Young Egypt Party or the Young Egypt Party from the 1930s
