= Misr el-Fatah =

Misr el-Fatah may refer to:

The Young Egypt Party or the Young Egypt Party from the 1930s
