= 1987 Egyptian parliamentary election =

- 6 and 13 April 1987

All 458 seats to the People's Assembly of Egypt 230 seats were needed for a majority

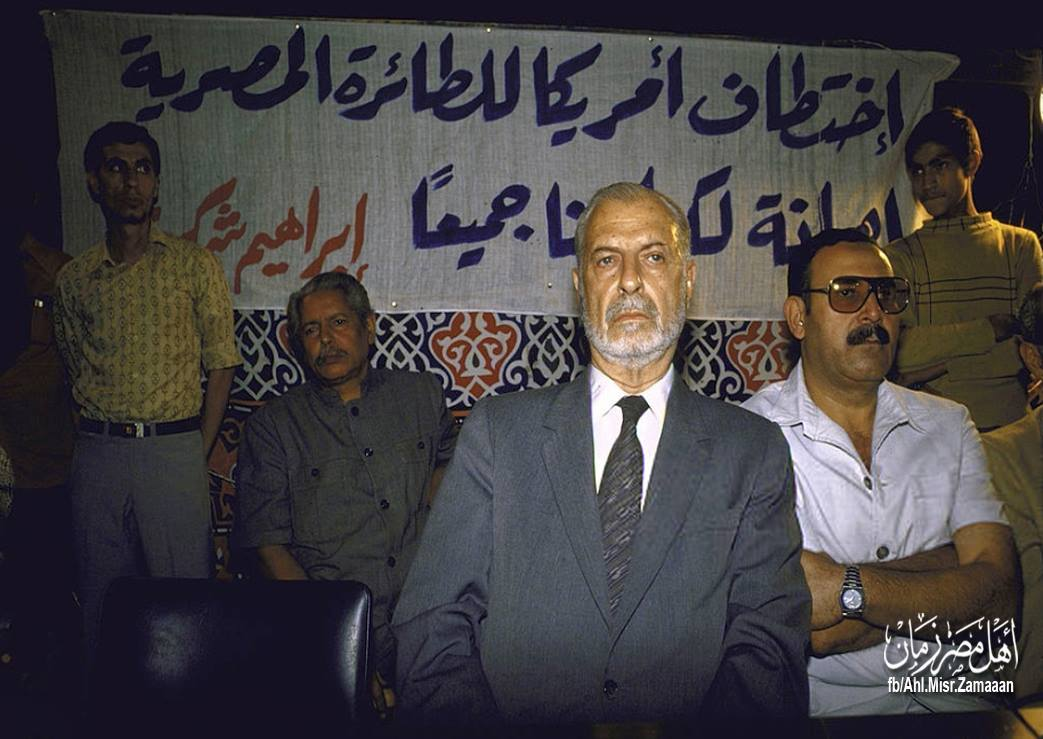
	First party	Second party
Leader	Atef Sedki	Ibrahim Shoukry
Party	NDP	IA
Seats won	346	60
Popular vote	4,751,758	1,163,525
Percentage	69.62%	17.05%
Prime Minister before election
Atef Sedki
National Democratic Party
Subsequent Prime Minister
Atef Sedki
National Democratic Party

Early parliamentary elections were held in Egypt on 6 April 1987, with a second round for nine seats on 13 April. They followed a change in the electoral law, approved by a referendum in February, which would allow independent candidates to run in the election. The result was a victory for the ruling National Democratic Party, which won 346 of the 458 seats. Following the election, the People's Assembly nominated incumbent Hosni Mubarak for the post of president, whose candidacy was put to voters in a referendum on 5 October.

Voter turnout was reported to be 50.45%, but was estimated to be closer to 25%.

== Results ==
Party	Votes	%	Seats	+/–
National Democratic Party	4,751,758	69.62	346	–44
Islamic Alliance (SLP–LSP–MB)	1,163,525	17.05	60	+60
New Wafd Party	746,023	10.93	35	–23
National Progressive Unionist Rally Party	150,570	2.21	0	0
Umma Party	13,031	0.19	0	New
Independents			7	New
Presidential appointees			10	0
Total	6,824,907	100.00	458	0
Valid votes	6,824,908	94.43		
Invalid/blank votes	402,559	5.57		
Total votes	7,227,467	100.00		
Registered voters/turnout	14,324,162	50.46		
Source: Nohlen et al., (Note: There is a difference of one between the total number of votes for each party (6,824,907) and the total of valid votes (6,824,908).) IPU
