= Rahat (disambiguation) =

Rahat (Arabic: رهط, Hebrew: רַהַט), a predominantly Bedouin city in the Southern District of Israel.

- Rahat (confectionery), an alternative name of Turkish delight in many languages

== People ==
- Rahat Afza, Pakistani politician, member of the Provincial Assembly of the Punjab
- Rahat Ali (cricketer) (born 1988), Pakistani cricketer
- Rahat Amanullah, Pakistani politician, member of the National Assembly of Pakistan
- Rahat Hayat or DJ Rahat, Bangladeshi DJ
- Rahat Indori (born 1950), Indian Bollywood lyricist and Urdu language poet
- Rahat Jamali (born 1965), Pakistani politician, member of the Provincial Assembly of Balochistan
- Rahat Kazmi, Pakistani actor, anchorman and speaker and academic
- Rahat Khan (born 1940), Bangladeshi journalist and litterateur
- Rahat Khan (field hockey), Pakistani field hockey player and league official
- Rahat Fateh Ali Khan (born 1974), Pakistani musician, primarily of Qawwali, a devotional music of the Muslim Sufis
- Rahat Zakheli (born 1884), Pashto poet, author and publisher

== Other ==
- Rahat (supermarket), a supermarket chain in Azerbaijan
- Harrat Rahat, a volcanic lava field in the Hejazi region of Saudi Arabia
- Operation Rahat, the name given to the Indian Air Force's rescue operations to evacuate civilians affected by the 2013 North India floods
- PNS Rahat Hospital, a Pakistan Naval hospital

== See also ==
- Rafat, given name and surname
- Rifat, given name and surname
- Refaat
