= Alnarp =

Swedish locality

Coordinates: 55°39′N 13°04′E

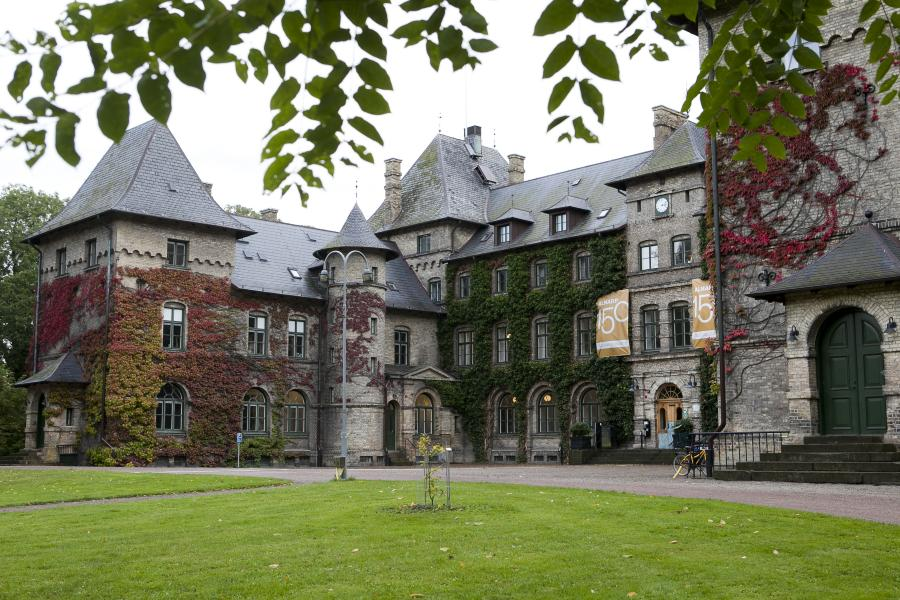
Alnarp Castle

Alnarp (Swedish pronunciation: [ˈɑ̂ːlnarp]) is a village and university campus in Lomma Municipality, Skåne County, Sweden, lying between Lund and Malmö.

The first written mention of Alnarp is from 1325. In 1674 it became the official residence of the governor-general of Scania. In 1862, the existing Alnarp Castle was built to house a new school of agronomy, now part of the Alnarp campus of the Swedish University of Agricultural Sciences.

Alnarp also housed the headquarters of the NordGen. The park at Alnarp Castle is famous for its great diversity of tree species. The campus area also consist of Alnarp Rehabilitation Garden, where the Swedish University of Agricultural Sciences conducts R&D as well as education in horticultural therapy, environmental psychology and landscape architecture, regarding connections between people's stay in nature and garden environments and their health and well-being.
