= Hilmi Murad =

Egyptian economist and politician (1919–1998)

Minister of Education
- In office 20 May 1968 – 1969
- President: Gamal Abdel Nasser

Personal details
- Born: 7 July 1919 Cairo, Sultanate of Egypt
- Died: 1998 (aged 78–79)
- Party: Socialist Labour Party; New Wafd Party
- Education: Cairo University; University of Paris

Hilmi Murad (1919–1998) was an Egyptian economist and politician who served as the general secretary and vice president of the Socialist Labour Party. In addition, he was one of the ministers of education of Egypt.

== Early life and education ==
Hilmi Murad was born on 7 July 1919 in Cairo. His sister, Amina Murad, was the wife of Kamal Al Din Salah who was assassinated on 16 April 1957 while serving as a consultant to the United Nations in Mogadishu, Somali.

Hilmi Murad graduated from the Faculty of Law at Cairo University in 1939 and received a postgraduate diploma in public law in 1940. He received a PhD from the University of Paris in 1949.

== Career ==
Murad joined the Public Prosecution Office in 1942 and served there until 1946. He worked as a professor of public finance. He served as the vice president of Cairo University. In the 1960s he worked in the UNESCO. He was appointed minister of education on 20 May 1968 when Gamal Abdel Nasser reshuffled the cabinet. Murad's tenure ended in 1969 when he was removed from office by Nasser.

Murad was a member of the socialist party which was established by Ahmad Hussein in the 1940s. Later he became one of the leading figures of the Socialist Labour Party and served as its vice president in the 1980s. He was also one of the contributors of the newspaper Al Shaab. He later joined the New Wafd Party. Murad was one of its three vice presidents and also, headed the parliament group of the party. In addition, he was the spokesperson of the party.

== Later years and death ==
In early October 1993 Hilmi Murad and three other members of the Socialist Labour Party were arrested and detained for three days due to the publication of an article in Al Shaab newspaper which harshly criticized the Egyptian President Hosni Mubarak. Murad died in 1998.
