= Ahmed Rifaat (disambiguation) =

- Ahmed Rifaat
- Ahmed Rifaat (judge)
- Ahmad Rifaat Pasha

== See also ==
- Ahmed Refaat
