= Alliance (1987 Egyptian political party) =

Political party in Egypt

Alliance التحالف الإسلامي
- Leader: Ibrahim Shoukry; Mustafa Kamel Murad; Muhammad Hamid Abu al-Nasr
- Founded: 1987
- Dissolved: 1990
- Ideology: Sunni Islamism; Social conservatism Religious conservatism Mixed economy Islamic Socialism; Islamic liberalism Economic liberalism
- House of Representatives: (1987) 60 / 458

The Alliance (Arabic: التحالف الإسلامي, romanized: ِِِAl Tahaluf al-islāmī) ,commonly known as just Al-Tahaluf (The Alliance), was an electoral and parliamentary bloc in the People's Assembly of Egypt. It was created in 1987 as an alliance of Islamist parties and political factions in the Egyptian parliament. It ran in the 1987 parliamentary election and gained 60 seats, becoming the largest opposition bloc in the Egyptian parliament. The Alliance was dissolved by the time of the 1990 parliamentary election due to disagreements on whether to participate or boycott the elections.

== Affiliated parties ==
- Labour Party
- Liberal Socialists Party
- Independents Affiliated with the Muslim Brotherhood
