= Kamal Al Din Salah =

Egyptian jurist and diplomat (1910–1957)

- Born: Mohammad Kamal Al Din Salah; 28 May 1910; Cairo, Sultanate of Egypt
- Died: 16 April 1957 (aged 46); Mogadishu
- Cause of death: Assassination
- Occupations: Jurist; Diplomat
- Spouse: Amina Murad

Kamal Al Din Salah (1910–1957) was an Egyptian jurist and diplomat. After serving as a diplomat in different countries he worked as a delegate of Egypt to the United Nations in Mogadishu, Somalia, where he was assassinated.

== Biography ==
Salah was born in Cairo on 28 May 1910. He received a bachelor's degree in law from Cairo University in 1932. Upon graduation he worked as a lawyer. In 1936 he joined the Ministry of Foreign Affairs and served as a diplomat in different countries, including Lebanon, Jordan, Japan, Syria, Sweden, Czechoslovakia and France. In 1953 Salah was appointed by President Gamal Abdel Nasser to the United Nations Advisory Council in Somalia as a delegate.

His wife was Amina Murad, a sister of Hilmi Murad who was a politician. Kamal and Amina had a son, Mohammad Farid. He was assassinated on 16 April 1957 in front of his residence in Mogadishu, Somalia. He was serving as the chairman of the UN Advisory Council on Italian Somaliland during the incident. Salah was posthumously awarded the Star of Somali Solidarity, and a street and a cultural center in Mogadishu were named after him.

A Somali man was arrested and sent to prison for life due to his involvement in Salah's assassination. The Italian colonists were also implicated in the murder. An Egyptian newspaper, Akhbar Al Youm, claimed on 20 April 1957 that the murderers of Salah were from Ethiopia.
