= Alnarp Castle =

Castle in Scania, Sweden

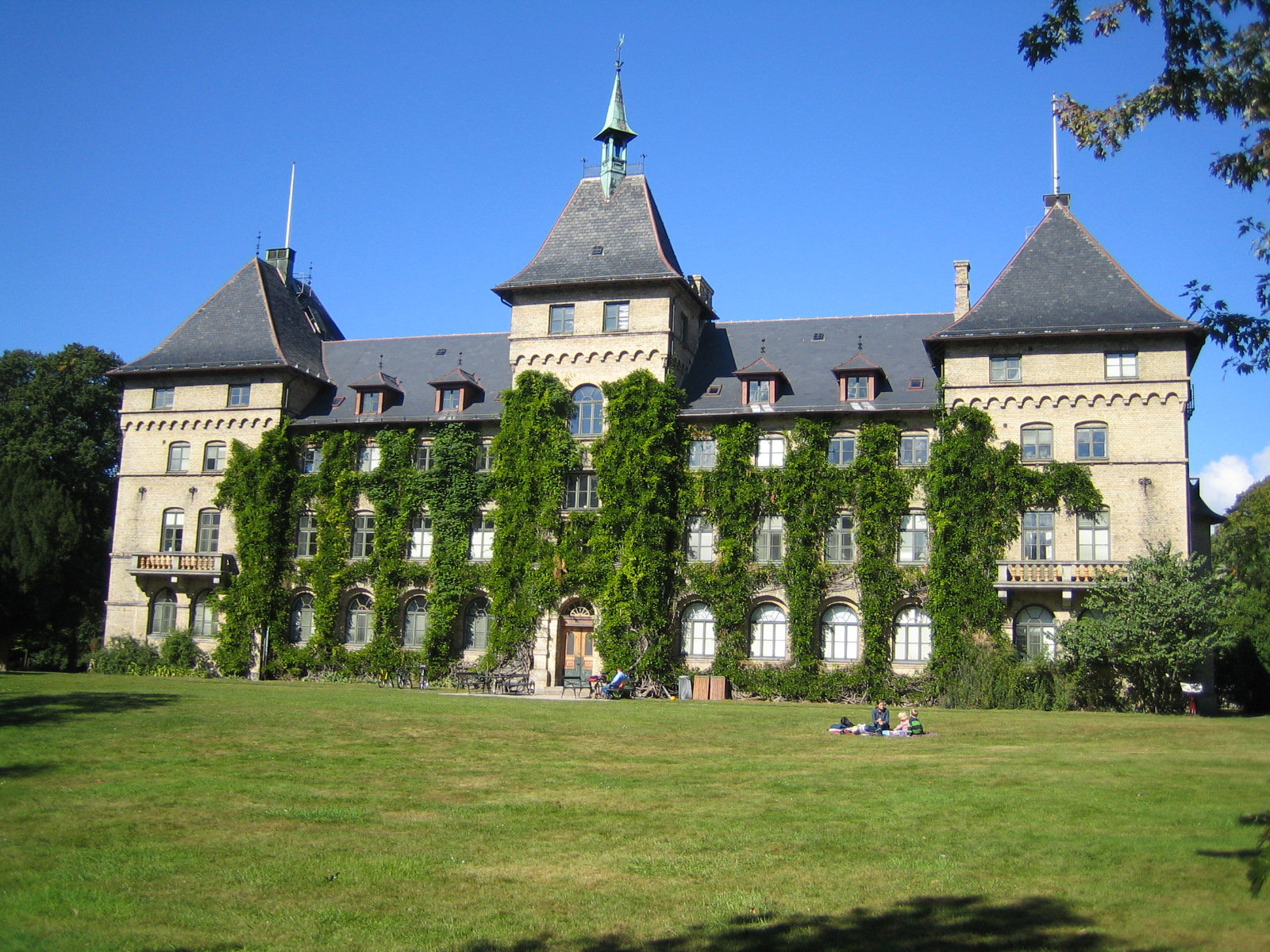

Location
- Scania Sweden
- Location within Skåne
- Coordinates: 55.6561°N 13.0810°E

Alnarp Castle (Swedish: Alnarps slott) is located in Alnarp, Lomma Municipality, Scania, approximately 10 km north of Malmö in southern Sweden. The original castle on the property was built in the 12th century. The present building was erected in 1862, in French Renaissance style.

== History ==
The castle was first mentioned in the 12th century. In 1325 Alnarp came into the possession of a knight named Anders Pedersen, and then Aage Nielsen Ulfeldt in the early 15th century. In 1449, Alnarp passed into the ownership of Niels Stigsen Thott. The Ulfeldt and the Thott families were members of the Scanian nobility. The castle eventually passed to the Krummedige family, and in 1500 it was owned by Erik Krummedige, a cousin of Henrik Krummedige, and an advisor to the Danish king. In 1536, Christian III took possession of the castle for the Danish state.

After the Treaty of Roskilde in 1658, King Charles X Gustav of Sweden gave the castle to a commandant of Malmö, Johan von Essen. In 1660, Charles XI gave it to Gabriel Oxenstierna. From 1694, it became the residence for the Governors-General of Sweden in Scania.

== Today ==
Today the castle houses offices and meeting rooms used by the Swedish University of Agricultural Sciences. The castle park has the second greatest variety of trees in Sweden and is open to the public year-round.
