= Refaat =

Refaat or Refat is a masculine given name and surname of Arabic origin (Arabic: رفعت). Notable people with the name include:

== Given name ==
- Refaat Alareer (1979–2023), Palestinian writer, poet, professor, and activist from the Gaza Strip
- Refaat Al-Gammal (1927–1982), Egyptian spy in Israel for 17 years
- Refaat El-Sayed (born 1946), businessman of Egyptian and Swedish nationality
- Refaat Kaid (born 1949), Egyptian sports shooter
- Refaat R. Kamel, Egyptian surgeon, world president of the International College of Surgeons
- Refat Amin (born 1953), Bangladesh politician, Member of the Bangladesh Parliament (2014–2018)
- Refat Appazov (1920–2008), Soviet and Russian rocket scientist of Crimean-Tatar descent
- Refat Chubarov (born 1957), Ukrainian politician and leader of the Crimean Tatar national movement
- Refat Mustafaev (1911–1984), Crimean Tatar communist regional party secretary and World War II partisan battalion commissar

== Surname ==
- Ahmed Refaat (1993–2024), Egyptian footballer
- Hady Refaat or Hady Shahin (born 1986), Egyptian handball player
- Mahmoud Refaat (born 1978), international relations scholar, writer and lawyer
- Omar Refaat, professional squash player

== See also ==
- Rafat, given name and surname
- Rahat
- Rifat, given name and surname
