= Music Al Remas TV =

Music Al Remas TV قناة ميوزك الرماس
- Country: Iraq
- Broadcast area: Worldwide, via satellite and internet

Programming
- Language(s): English, Arabic

History
- Launched: 2013

Links
- Website: "Music Alremas Channel". Archived from the original on 2017-12-11.

Al-Remas Music Productions Ltd. is a company specialized in the production and distribution of music with a focus on promoting artists from Iraq and the Persian Gulf. Founded by Rafat Albadr in 2013, the channel specializes in Arabic-language music.

== See also ==
- Television in Iraq
