= Abdelhafid Boussouf =

Algerian politician (1926–1980)

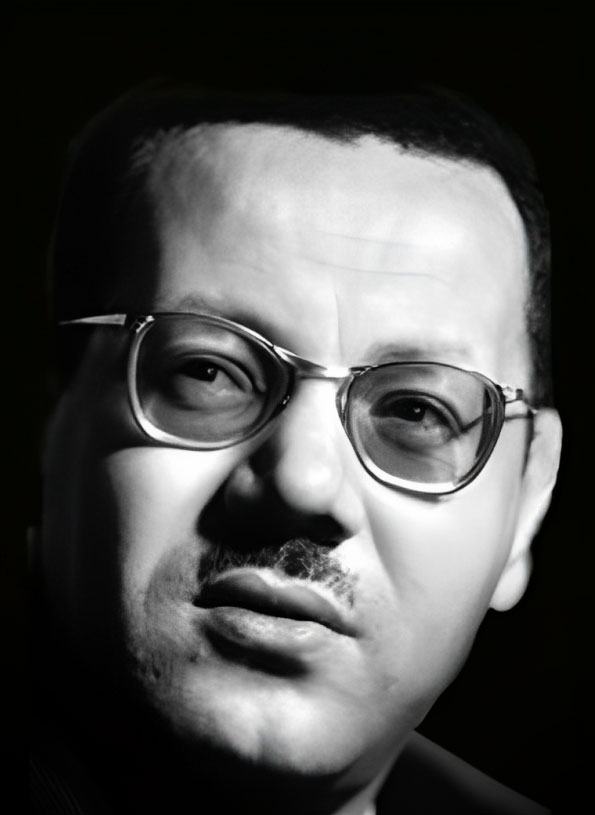
- Abdelhafid_Boussouf - Si Mabrouk
- Born: 1926; Mila, French Algeria
- Died: December 31, 1980 (aged 54); Paris, France

Abdelhafid Boussouf (Arabic: عبد الحفيظ بوصوف; 17 August 1926, Mila, Algeria – 31 December 1980 Paris, France) was an Algerian nationalist and a leader of the National Liberation Front (FLN) during the Algerian War of Independence (1954–62). He was a member of the GPRA exile government, serving as minister of armaments (Ministre de l'armement et des liaisons générales) and member of Oujda Group. This body, the MALG, after independence evolved into the Securité militaire (SM), or military intelligence, which eventually emerged as a pillar of the military-backed regimes of Algeria, and whose successor organization (DRS) remains of overwhelming importance in Algerian politics today. After independence, however, he personally left politics and remained outside of the governing circle to pursue a career in business. He died on December 31, 1980, in Paris. His name was given to the university of his hometown Mila.

== See also ==
- Declaration of 1 November 1954
- Fathi al-Dib
