= Fathi al-Dib =

- Born: 1923
- Died: 7 February 2003; Cairo, Egypt
- Military career
- Allegiance: Egypt
- Branch: GIS
- Service years: 1953-1970

Fathi al-Dib (فتحي الديب 1923 - February 7, 2003) was an Egyptian intelligence officer, who headed the Department of Arab Affairs at the General Intelligence Service (GIS) during the 1950s and 60s. At the founding of the GIS by Gamal Abdel Nasser and Zakaria Mohieddin, al-Dib was among the first group of military officers recruited to work in the agency. He played an important role in the Algerian War of Independence, working closely with FLN cadres in Cairo, along with Suleiman Ezzat.

He also played an important role in the 1958 Lebanese Civil War, where Egypt was supporting the Lebanese opposition (the so-called Lebanese National Movement). Al-Dib was also the founder of the Voice of Arabs (Sawt al-Arab) radio station, which started only as a daily show before becoming its own stand alone radio station, and he personally recruited its most famous broadcaster and director Ahmed Said. Fathi al-Dib also worked closely with Swiss financier and Die Spinne operative, François Genoud.

Al-Dib was a prolific author and published several books where he recounted his activities at the GIS in great details (including various facsimiles of the receipts of gun shipments to Algeria's ALN). His book about Algeria attracted the attention of French historians given its "insider" perspective and the novel information it contained about the various personal feuds between FLN members and the inner works of their relationship to Cairo, and it was translated to French twice, in 1986 and 2004.

== See also ==
- Kamal Rifaat, his colleague who replaced him as head of the Algerian dossier at the GIS when his relations with the FLN deteriorated.
- Ahmed Ben Bella, his key FLN ally
- Abdelhafid Boussouf, his Algerian counterpart who founded the FLN's intelligence apparatus, with whom he had conflictual relations.
