= 1987 Egyptian electoral reform referendum =

Egyptian electoral reform referendum

- 12 February 1987

Results
| Choice | Votes | % |
|---|---|---|
| Yes | 9,423,384 | 88.90% |
| No | 1,176,054 | 11.10% |

A referendum on electoral reform was held in Egypt on 12 February 1987. The reform would set aside 48 seats for independent candidates at elections. The change in the law had been hastily adopted in December 1986 in order to pre-empt the Constitutional Court ruling that the 1984 elections had been unconstitutional as they had not allowed independent candidates to stand. The changes were approved by 89% of voters, leading to the early dissolution of the People's Assembly and early elections in April.

== Results ==
| Choice | Votes | % |
|---|---|---|
| For | 9,423,384 | 88.90 |
| Against | 1,176,054 | 11.10 |
| Total | 10,599,438 | 100.00 |
| Registered voters/turnout | 14,388,255 | – |
Source: Nohlen et al.
