= Kamal Rifaat =

Egyptian military officer and politician (1921–1977)

- Born: Kamaleddine Mahmoud Rifaat; 1 November 1921; Alexandria, Kingdom of Egypt
- Died: 13 July 1977 (aged 55); Cairo, Egypt
- Education: Military academy
- Occupation: Military officer
- Years active: 1941–1977
- Awards: Order of the Republic

Kamal Rifaat (Arabic: كمال الدين رفعت, romanized: Kemal ad-Din Rifa'at; 1 November 1921 – 13 July 1977) was an Egyptian military officer and one of the members of the Free Officers movement. He held several government posts after the Egyptian revolution in 1952.

== Early life and education ==
Rifaat was born in Alexandria on 1 November 1921. His father was an engineer. After completing primary and secondary education in Cairo Kamal Rifaat graduated from the military academy.

== Career ==
Kamal Rifaat joined the Egyptian army in 1941 and served there until 1945. He was part of the Iron Guard along with Captain Mustafa Kamal Sidqi and Anwar Sadat which was composed of the supporters of King Farouk. Then he worked in Khartoum, Sudan, in a secret organization to resist the British occupation. Next, he participated in the 1948 Palestine War during which he met Gamal Abdel Nasser.

Rifaat joined the Free Officers movement which carried out the Egyptian revolution in 1952. He was part of the first cell of the movement founded by Nasser. He became a member of the 14-member Revolution Command Council following the 1952 revolution, and his military rank was colonel. However, he was among the non-voting members of the council.

Rifaat was appointed acting minister of religious affairs in February 1959 when Ahmad Hassan Bakoury resigned from the post. Rifaat was also made the chairman of the Dar Akhbar Al Youm company, publisher of the Akhbar Al Youm newspaper, in 1960 when all publications in the country were nationalized.

Rifaat was named as the minister of state and labour in August 1961 to the cabinet led by Gamal Abdel Nasser. He was also made acting minister of social affairs on 12 October 1961 when Syrian ministers vacated their posts in the cabinet. Rifaat was permanently appointed to the post in the cabinet formed on 18 October and remained in office until September 1962.

A new constitution was accepted on 27 September 1962 and then, a presidential council was formed under the presidency of Nasser. Rifaat was one of the twelve members of this council. He was also one of the members of the Arab Socialist Union's higher executive committee in 1962 and became part of its secretariat in November 1964.

In addition, Rifaat served in various posts, including the minister of labor (June 1967–November 1970), director of ideological development within the Workers' Bureau of the Arab Socialist Union and the government publishing houses as well as the director of the modernization" program at Al Azhar University. Between 1971 and 1973 Rifaat was the ambassador of Egypt to the United Kingdom. He submitted his credentials to Queen Elizabeth at Buckingham Palace on 12 October 1971.

After leaving public service Rifaat became the leading figure of the non-Communist leftists who supported the Nasserism. In 1976, he co-founded the National Progressive Unionist Party with Khaled Mohieddin, another member of the Revolution Command Council, known as Free Officers Movement.

=== Views ===
Rifaat was one of the Free Officers who had Marxist views and had a Titoist leaning. However, later he became one of the fierce critics of the Iraqi Prime Minister Abd al-Karim Qasim whom he regarded as having connections with both Western imperialism and Communism.

Rifaat described Al Asifa people or the Fatah members as elite and excellent revolutionaries on 3 August 1966, but he also added that their operations should not be "a threat to Israel’s survival." In addition, he stated that these operations should be "connected and coordinated with the overall Arab plans for the liberation of Filastin."

== Death and honors ==
Kamal Rifaat died in Cairo on 13 July 1977. He was the recipient of the Order of the Republic and several decorations from Cameroon, Morocco, Yugoslavia and Tunisia.

== See also ==
- Fathi al-Dib
