= Rafati =

Rafati (Persian: رفعتی; related either to the Arabic Muslim masculine given name Rafaat (Arabic: رَفْعَت) or Rifat (Arabic: رِفْعَت)) is an Arabic and Persian language surname which is also to be found among the Iranian diaspora. Notable people with the surname include:

- Babak Rafati (born 1970), former Iranian-German football referee
- Jami Rafati (born 1994), Iranian-Italian footballer
- Shahrzad Rafati (born 1980), Canadian chief executive of Iranian descent
