= Dan H. Yaalon =

Israeli pedologist and soil scientist (1924–2014)

Dan Hardy Yaalon
- דן הארדי יעלון
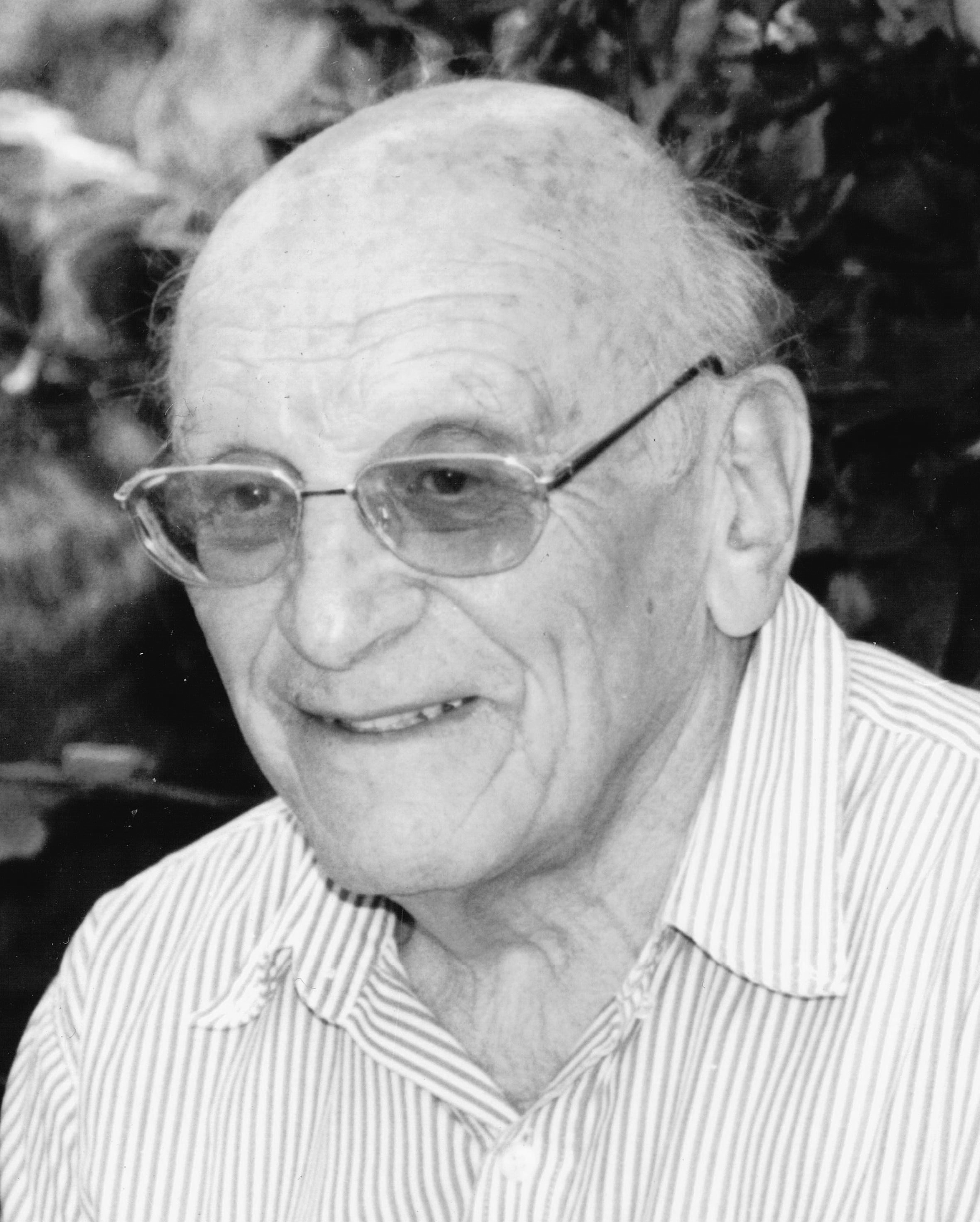
- Yaalon in 1998
- Born: Hardy Berger; May 11, 1924; Uherské Hradiště, Czechoslovakia
- Died: January 29, 2014 (aged 89); Mevasseret Zion, Israel
- Education: Swedish University of Agricultural Sciences; Hebrew University of Jerusalem
- Awards: Sarton Medal (2000), Dokuchaev Award (IUSS, 2010)
- Scientific career
- Fields: Pedology, Soil science
- Workplaces: Hebrew University of Jerusalem
- Doctoral advisor: Avraham Adolf Reifenberg
- Other academic advisors: Sante Emil Mattson

Dan Hardy Yaalon (Hebrew: דן הארדי יעלון; May 11, 1924 – January 29, 2014) was an Israeli pedologist and soil scientist. He contributed to the fields of arid and Mediterranean pedology and paleopedology, as well as the history, sociology, and philosophy of soil science. Through a research career spanning over six decades (1950–2014), Yaalon was an active member of the International Union for Quaternary Research (INQUA) and the International Soil Science Society (ISSS; later the International Union of Soil Sciences; IUSS). He was awarded the Sarton Medal for his contribution to the history of science, and the Dokuchaev Award.

== Early life and education ==
Dan Hardy Yaalon was born as Hardy Berger on May 11, 1924, in Uherské Hradiště, Czechoslovakia (modern day Czech Republic) to a middle-class Jewish family involved in the textile business. He was the youngest child of Hugo J. Berger and Elsa Jellinek, and had two older sisters, Dita and Stella. Yaalon was a curious child and a high-achieving pupil, who showed an early interest in exploring his environment. Typical for his family background, Yaalon was part of the Maccabi youth movement, an international Zionist movement aimed at motivating Jewish youth to immigrate to "Eretz Israel". Yaalon's comfortable childhood was disrupted at the age of 10 by the death of his father.

The Nazi occupation of Czechoslovakia five years later in 1939 further fragmented the family. Yaalon's mother encouraged him to leave the country to escape the escalating Anti-Jewish measures. In March 1939, Yaalon left Uherske Hradiste for the Youth Aliyah School in Prague, a Jewish Youth Immigration School, where he was a student for three months. During that time, Yaalon was offered an internship at the Zionist agricultural training program in Denmark, as a preparatory step for emigrating to Israel. Yaalon left Czechoslovakia and travelled by train via Germany to Denmark, after which he never saw his mother again. In September 1943, after a long period of hiding and struggling to feed himself, he began academic studies at the Royal Veterinary and Agricultural University in Copenhagen. Two months later, Denmark was also occupied by the Nazis, and Yaalon escaped to Sweden.

Upon arrival in Sweden, Yaalon immediately requested admission to the Swedish University of Agricultural Sciences at Uppsala. There he met the prominent Swedish soil chemist Sante Emil Mattson (1886–1980), who appointed Yaalon as his assistant. At that time, Yaalon made his first soil-profile observation. In 1944 Yaalon returned to Czechoslovakia and volunteered in the Czech Army, unaware that his family had been killed in the Holocaust. After the war, Yaalon discovered that his mother had been sent to Theresienstadt concentration camp in Czechoslovakia, and then to Auschwitz-Birkenau in Poland, where she was killed. Yaalon left Czechoslovakia and returned to Denmark to resume his studies, completing a B.Sc. in Agricultural Sciences (Soil Chemistry) in July 1947.

== Move to Israel ==
In July 1948, after a long and complex journey from Europe to the Levant, Yaalon reached the newly formed state of Israel. In 1949, he joined the recently established Israel Defense Forces (IDF), serving a year in the Scientific Service Corps ("Hemed"). Around that period, Yaalon changed his first name from Hardy to Dan, and was registered as "Lieutenant Dan Berger". During his IDF service, Yaalon participated in the first geological field surveys of the Negev desert, whose hyperarid climate and rugged terrain with reg and loessial soils was completely alien to Yaalon, and became a key area of interest throughout his later career. After demobilization from the IDF, Yaalon found employment as a schoolteacher of chemistry and agriculture in Beit Yerach school, on the southern shore of the Sea of Galilee.

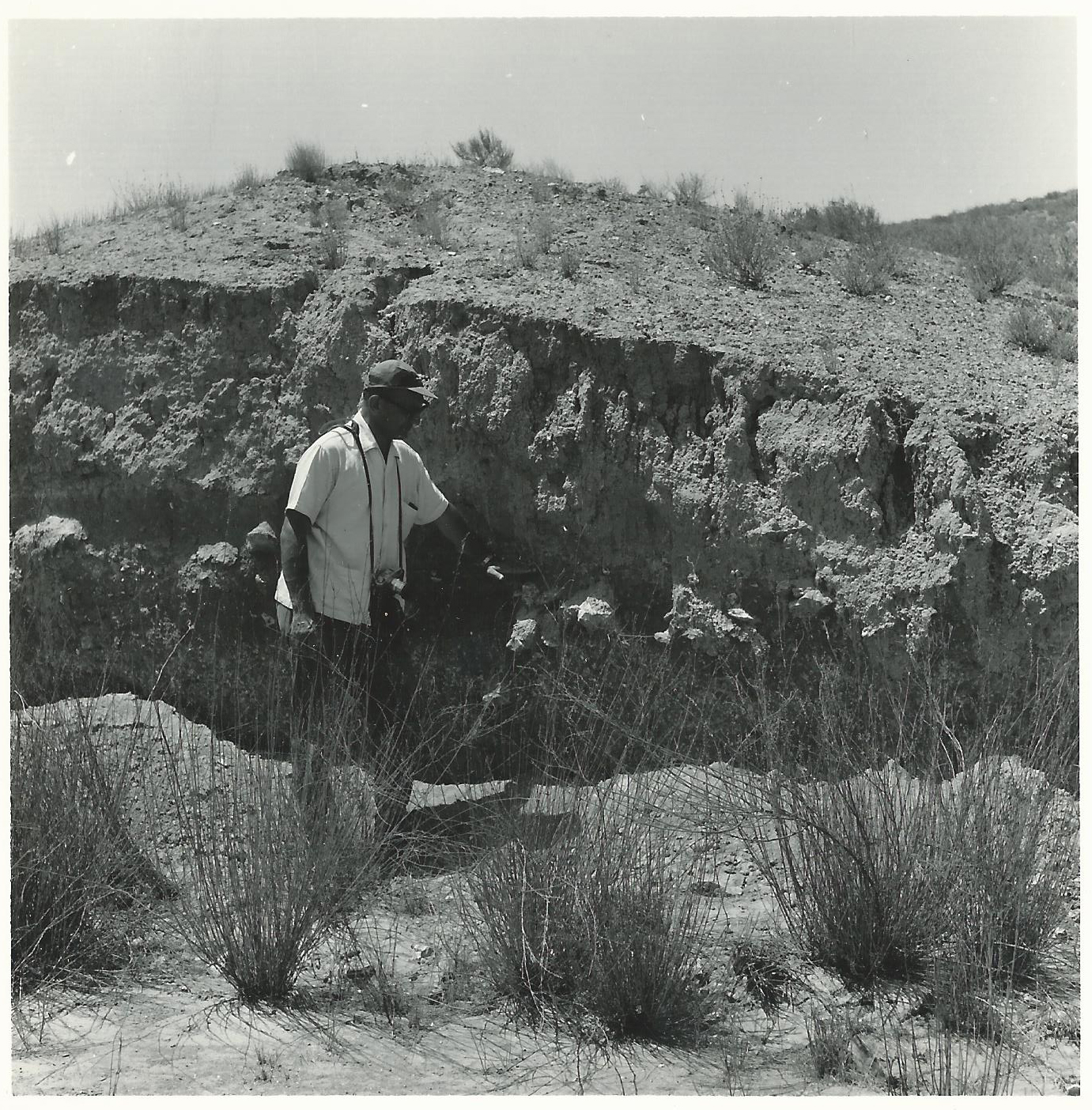
Dan Yaalon describing a loess profile in the Negev, 1960s

In 1951 Yaalon changed his European-sounding surname "Berger" in favor of "Yaalon", a combination of two of his favorite words: "Yael" (meaning "little antelope", the Hebrew translation of his mother's Czech maiden name "Jellinek"), and "Aliyah" ('ascension' in Hebrew, referring to the immigration of Jews to Israel). Yaalon moved "Hardy" to a middle name position, and thus became known as "Dan H. Yaalon". Shortly after, at a meeting about geological surveying and mapping, Yaalon's colleagues proposed naming some mountains and wadis after themselves. The official naming committee of that time approved the idea, hence the names of "Mt. Ya'alon" and "Wadi Ya'alon" in the southern Arava region. Around fifteen years later a young Nahal group (a paramilitary Israel Defense Forces program that combines military service and the establishment of agricultural settlements) that settled in the eastern foothills of Mt. Ya'alon, adopted "Ya'alon" as their group name. One of the group members, Moshe Smilansky, himself looking for a Hebrew version of his surname, adopted the group name as his own and changed his name to Moshe Ya'alon. He went on to become the Chief of Staff of the Israel Defense Forces (2002–2005) and subsequently the Israeli Minister of Defense (2013–2016).

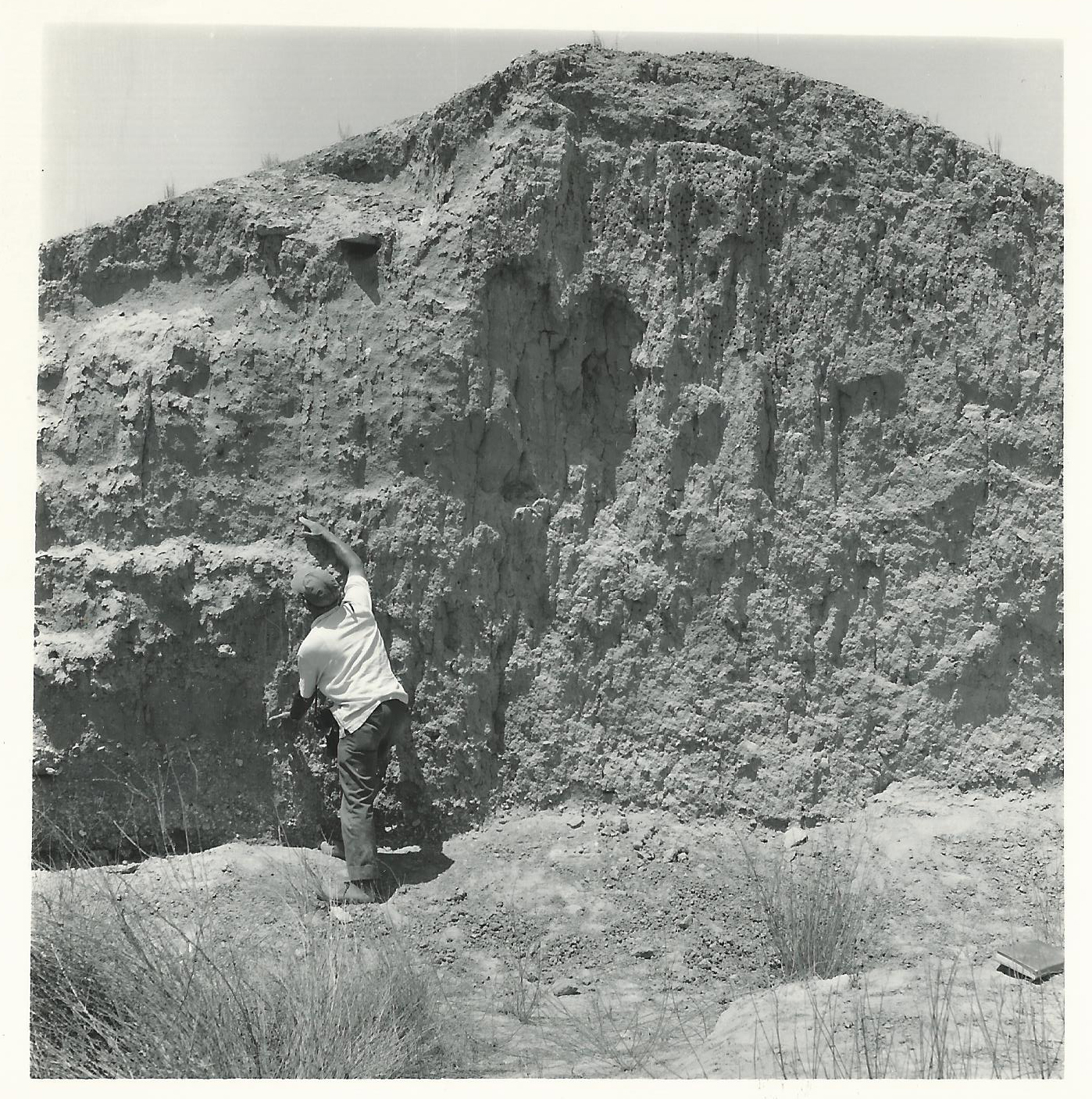
Dan Yaalon sampling a loess profile in the Negev, 1960s

== Academic career ==
Yaalon's long research career spanned over six decades, from 1950 to2014. In 1950, Yaalon asked Avraham Adolf Reifenberg (1899–1953), professor of soil science at the Hebrew University of Jerusalem, to become a student in the newly formed Soil Science Department, and was accepted as a doctoral student. His dissertation was on the subject of accumulation of salts in the soils of the Jordan Valley. His first publication was a detailed laboratory textbook written in 1952 during his studies, with his fellow student, Meir Rigby. Yaalon's research guidance was disrupted by Reifenberg's health problems, and when he died in 1953, Yaalon's supervision was passed over to Shlomo Ravikovitch (1899–2000).

In 1954, Yaalon was awarded a Ph.D. degree from the Hebrew University of Jerusalem, and posted to a post-doctoral position at the Rothamsted Experimental Station in England. Upon his return to Israel in 1955, Yaalon worked temporarily at a fertilizer research plant in Haifa, while continuing to publish academic output, including his 1955 study on the clay mineralogy of the soils of Israel. In 1957, Yaalon was appointed as lecturer at the Hebrew University of Jerusalem, where he would stay until his retirement and after. Due to his initial background in the field of soil colloids, his academic career focused on the finest fraction and texture of soils, one of his main motivations in working on aeolian dust throughout his research career.

In 1965, Yaalon urged INQUA to adopt the term "Paleopedology" (ancient Pedology), establishing the subject as a commission of INQUA, and later in the IUSS. In 1966, Yaalon presented his original concept of 'metapedogenesis', in which he defined humans as an important factor of soil formation. In August 1970, a joint ISSS and INQUA symposium was held in Amsterdam, on the 'Age of Parent Material and Soils', a result of correspondence between Yaalon, Robert Ruhe (1918–1993), and Ferdinand van Baren (1905–1975). The symposium was later summarized in the book Paleopedology: Origin, Nature and Dating of Paleosols, edited by Yaalon, which collated 29 selected multidisciplinary papers, including several contributions from Yaalon. In "Soil-forming processes in time and space", Yaalon suggested a dynamic model of the soil system, distinguishing between two major groups of soil equilibrium processes: 1) those approaching an equilibrium state at different rates, and; 2) irreversible or self-terminating processes. He then further developed each group and presented a classification of diagnostic pedofeatures according to their state of origin and relative nature of persistence.

In 1973 Yaalon and his former student, Eliezer Ganor (1935–2011), published a work concerning the important role of aeolian dust on the formation of soils in the eastern Mediterranean during the Quaternary. In that work, he discussed the global modes of dust and paths of distribution, and presented evidence that the red color of the Terra Rossa soils originated from the presence of iron oxides in airborne dust, while contradicting Reifenberg and others, who had attributed this color to carbon oxides from the underlying parent rock. Subsequently, Yaalon's arguments for the key role of Quaternary aeolian dust in the formation of soils gained international acceptance. When later asked what he considered to be the highlight of his career, Yaalon said that the dust-soil relations was his most significant contribution.

In 1975, Yaalon published "Conceptual models in pedogenesis: Can soil-forming functions be solved?", a high-profile article in which Yaalon demonstrated the complexity of the quantifying of pedogenetic processes. Consequently, in 1977 Yaalon was elected president of the INQUA Commission on Paleopedology. Another of Yaalon's editorial works was a special issue of Geoderma entitled "Climatic and Lithostratigraphic Significance of Paleosols", summarizing a symposium of the same name held in Ottawa, Canada. In 1994, at the age of 70 and two years past official retirement, Yaalon left his office at the Hebrew University of Jerusalem and only seldom returned to it, continuing his writing, editing and reviewing from his home. In 1997, Yaalon published a paper on the uniqueness of Mediterranean Soils, asking "What makes them different?". In that paper, he characterized the global nature of Mediterranean climates, while focusing on the region which encompasses the Mediterranean Sea. Discussing the soil and landscape characteristics, this paper gives a broad and detailed overview of the typical Mediterranean environmental conditions, geomorphology, geochemistry, pedology, and anthropogenic impacts on Mediterranean ecosystems.

Alongside his main focus on soil forming processes, Yaalon also made contributions to the fields of the history, philosophy and sociology of soil science. He played a key role in the establishment of the ISSS Working Group on the History of soil science (today the IUSS Commission 4.5 - History, philosophy and sociology of soil science). In 1997 he co-edited the book History of Soil Science: International Perspectives. This book is a collection of treaties which show historical developments in the understanding and attitude of humans to the soil. As demonstrated in this book, Yaalon's approach to the history of soil sciences emphasized the acknowledgment of soil distinctions and the unfolding of sub-disciplines as utilized by early agriculturists.

Yaalon continued publishing new work until the last days of his life. In 2012, after years of draft writing, he published his autobiography, A Passion for Science and Zion: The Yaalon Story. In the last two years of his life, Yaalon was preoccupied with reading archaeological literature, and Geoarchaeology. In the summer of 2013 Yaalon's health deteriorated, and on 29 January 2014 he died at home in Mevaseret Zion, Israel, surrounded by his family.

== Personal life ==
In 1952 Dan Yaalon married Rita Singer (1926–2010), and soon after their marriage they chose to live in Kiryat Moshe in western Jerusalem. The couple had two sons: David (1953) and Uri (1956). In 1975, the family moved to Givat HaMivtar, a neighborhood on the northern side of Jerusalem, and in 1997 they moved out of Jerusalem, to Mevaseret Zion. By the time of his death, Yaalon had seven grandchildren.

== Awards, honors, and legacy ==
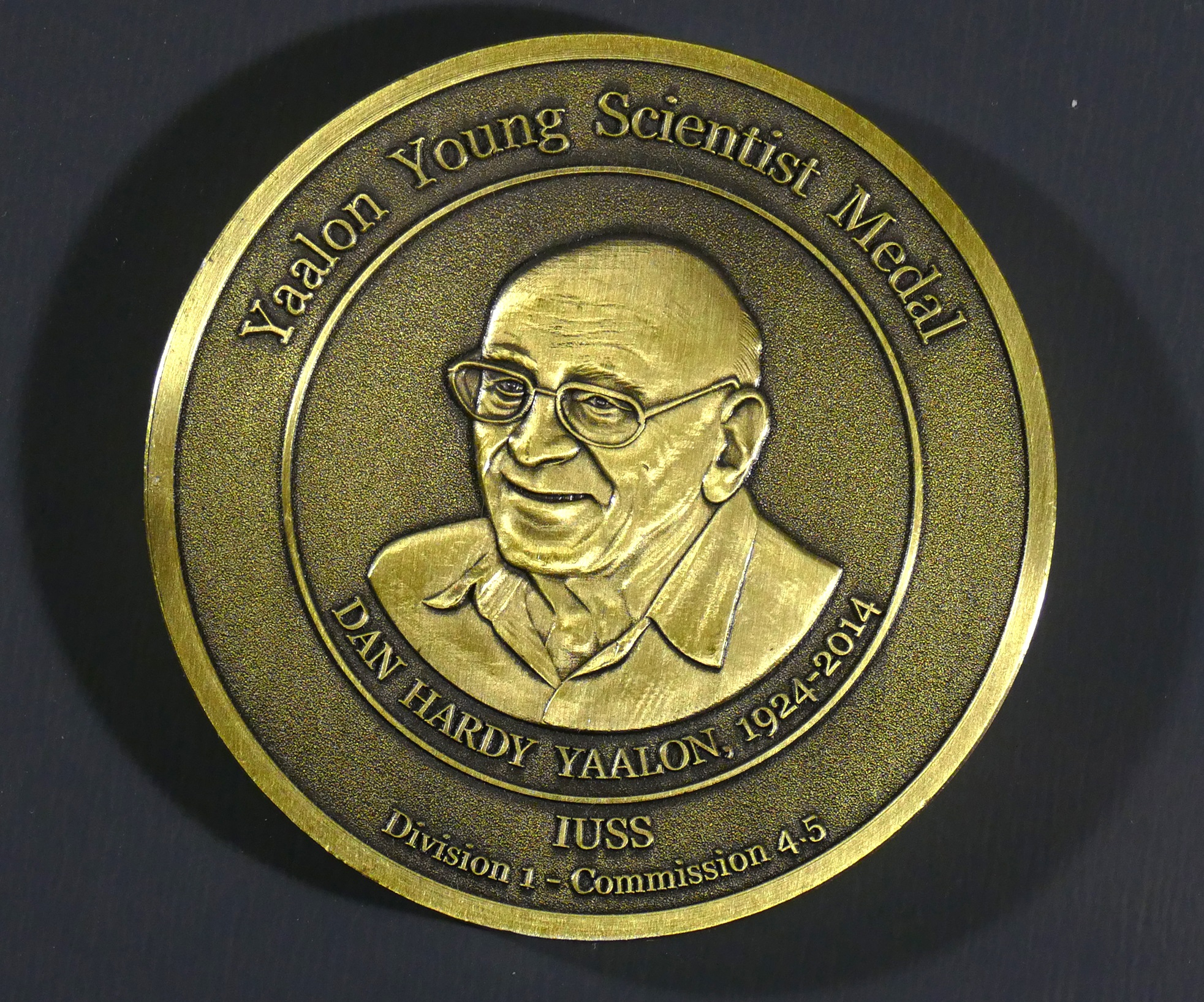
Yaalon young scientist award – front

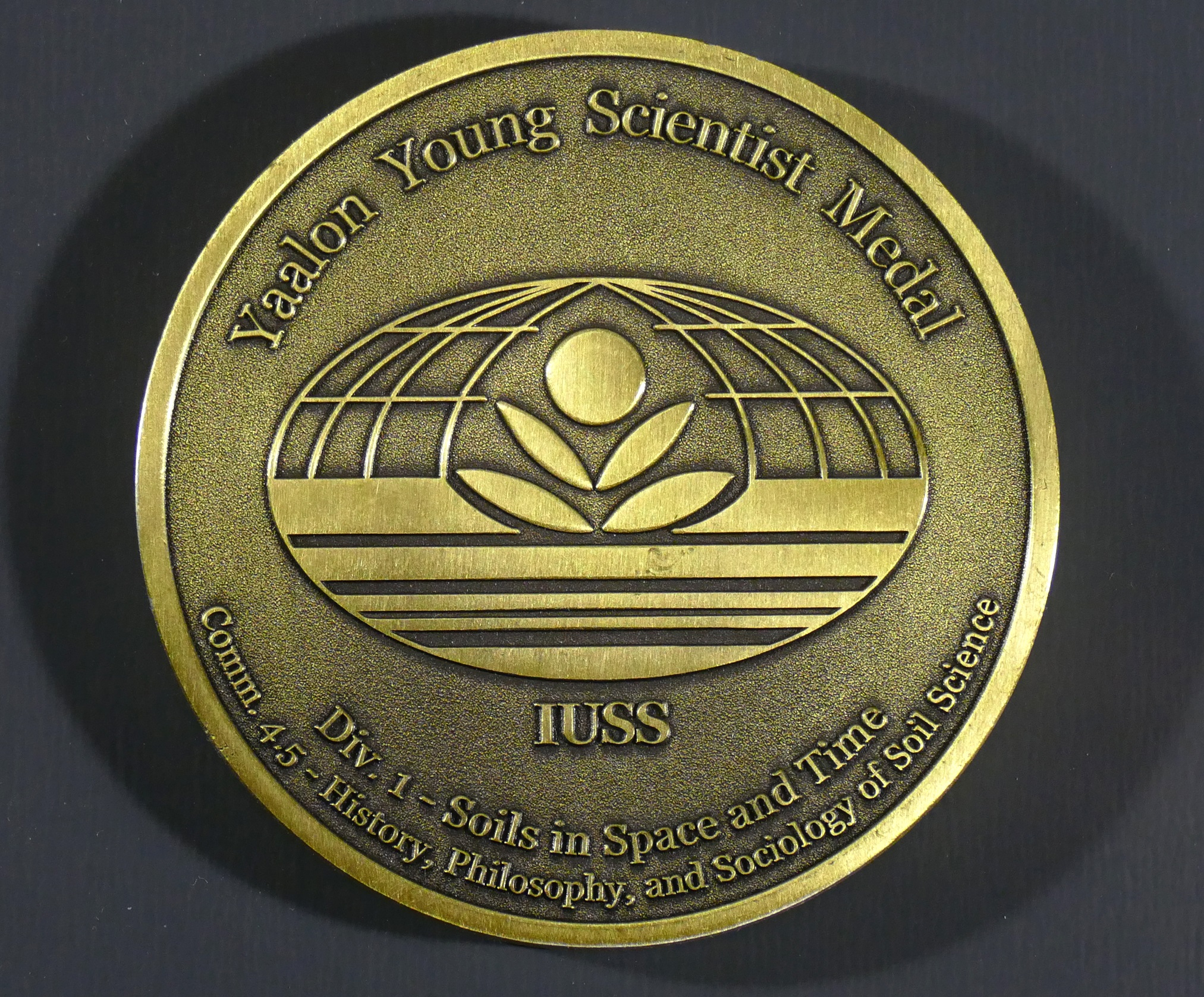
Yaalon young scientist award – back

Yaalon received numerous awards over his career. In 2000, Yaalon received the Sarton Medal, the top award of the History of Science Society, from Ghent University in Belgium for outstanding contribution to the History of Soil Science. In 2010, Yaalon received the Dokuchaev Award from the IUSS, in recognition of his life contribution to pedology and soil sciences. Yaalon was also an Honorary Fellow of the British, German, and Russian Soil Science Societies, and received an Honorary Membership from the Israeli (2001) and American (2008) Geological Societies, an Honorary Membership from the IUSS (1998), was an Honorary Life Fellow of INQUA, and received an Honorary Doctorate from the University of Tbilisi in Georgia. In April 2015 a special IUSS symposium in honor of Yaalon was held at the University of Natural Resources and Life Sciences (BOKU) in Vienna and Uherske Hradiste. This event was followed by a special Memorial Issue in the journal of CATENA. In 2016, the IUSS commemorated Dan Yaalon with the Dan Yaalon Young Scientist Medal, to be awarded every four years on an interdivisional level in the framework of the World Congresses of Soil Science.

== Selected publications ==
Dan Yaalon has contributed to more than 200 publications, including original articles, book chapters and reviews, conference papers, scientific notes, encyclopedia entries and highly cited abstracts. Furthermore, Yaalon has been the editor of numerous collections on pedology and soil science. He was a founding editor of CATENA, and an editorial board member of CATENA, Geoderma, and Soil Science. Some of Yaalon's key publications include:

- 1971 – Soil-forming processes in time and space.
- 1973 – The influence of dust on soils during the Quaternary.
- 1975 – Conceptual models in pedogenesis: Can soil-forming functions be solved?
- 1983 – Climate, time and soil development.
- 1997 – Soils in the Mediterranean region: What makes them different?
- 1997 – History of soil science in context: International perspective.
- 2000– Down to earth. Why soil-and soil science-matters.
- The fullest bibliographical list of Dan H. Yaalon is given in the Editorial of the CATENA Dan H. Yaalon Memorial Issue (Vol. 146), on pages 3-9.
