= Rifat =

Rifat or Rifaat is both a given name and a surname of Arabic origin (Arabic: رفعت). Notable people with the name include:

== Given name ==
- Rifaat al-Assad (1937–2026), Syrian politician
- Rifaat Eid (born 1977), Lebanese politician
- Rifaat El-Fanagily (1936–2004), Egyptian footballer
- Rifaat Garrana (1929–2017), Egyptian composer
- Rifaat Hussain (1952–2025), Pakistani political scientist, professor, defense analyst and television personality
- Rifaat el-Mahgoub (1926–1990), Egyptian politician
- Rifaat Turk (born 1954), Team Israel Olympic footballer, Deputy Mayor of Tel Aviv
- Rifat Artikov (born 1983), Uzbek decathlete
- Rifat Atun, British physician and academic
- Rifat Chadirji (1926–2020), Iraqi Turkmen architect
- Rifat Dedja, Albanian politician
- Rifat Hadžiselimović (born 1944), Bosnian geneticist
- Rifat Hasan (born 1980), Bangladeshi writer and poet
- Rifat Hoxha (born 1946), Albanian author and historian
- Rifat Ibërshimi (born 1950), Albanian footballer
- Rifat Jashari (born 1946), Kosovar Albanian public figure and patriarch of the Jashari family
- Rifat Odeh Kassis, Palestinian human rights activist
- Rifat Kukaj (1938–2005), Kosovar Albanian writer
- Rifat Latifi (born 1955), Kosovar-American surgeon
- Rifat Mustafin (born 1983), Russian footballer
- Rifat Ozbek (born 1953), Turkish-British fashion designer
- Rifat Pradhan (born 1997), Bangladeshi cricketer
- Rifat Rastoder (1950–2023), Montenegrin politician
- Rifat Shaykhutdinov (born 1963), Russian politician
- Rifat Zhemaletdinov (born 1996), Russian Tatar footballer

== Surname ==
- Ahmed Rifaat (1942–2017), Egpytian football coach
- Ahmed Rifaat (judge), Egyptian judge
- Ahmad Rifaat Pasha (1825–1858), Egyptian royal
- Alifa Rifaat (1930–1996), Egyptian author
- Bilal Rifaat (born 1957), Egyptian fencer
- Kamal Rifaat (1921–1977), Egyptian military officer and politician
- Nozad Saleh Rifaat (born 1941), Iraqi Kurdish physician and politician
- Rasheek Rifaat, Canadian electrical engineer

== See also ==
- Rafat (name)
- Rahat (disambiguation)
- Refaat
