= Dayr Rafat =

Dayr Rafat دير رفات
- Village
- Etymology: from personal name
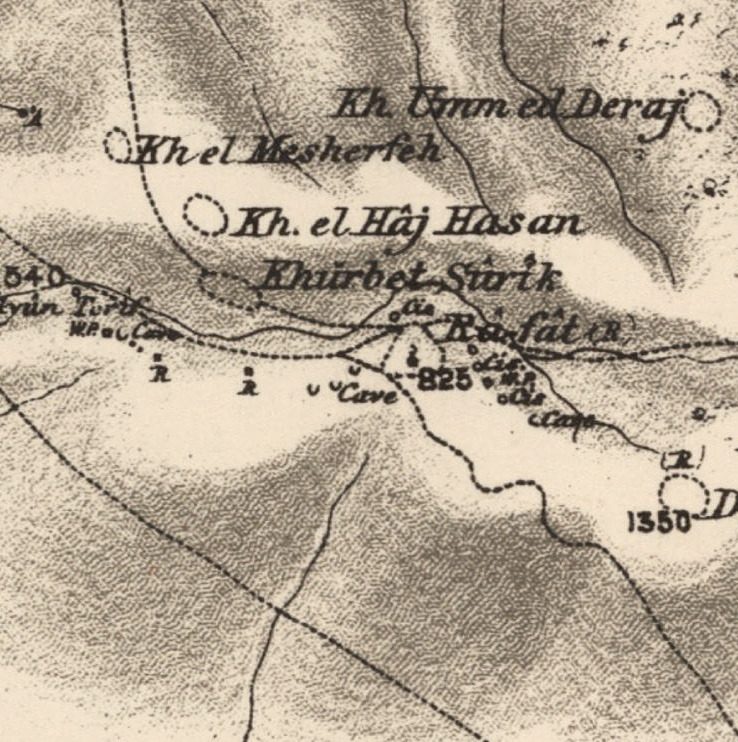
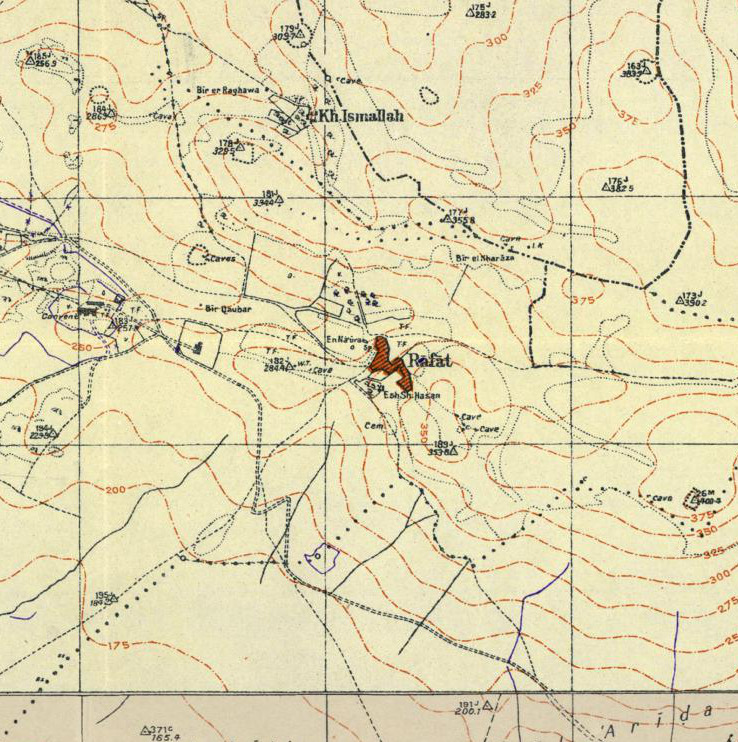
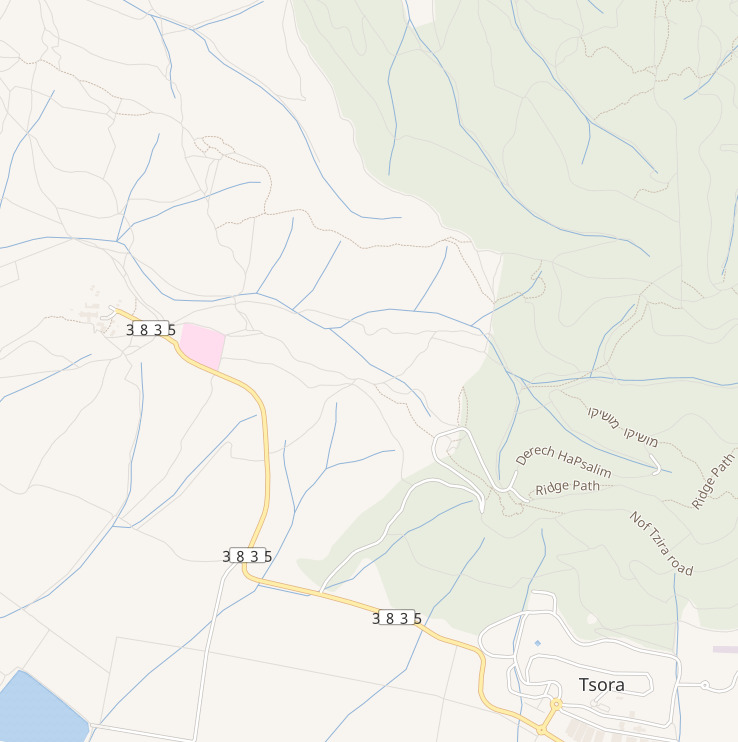
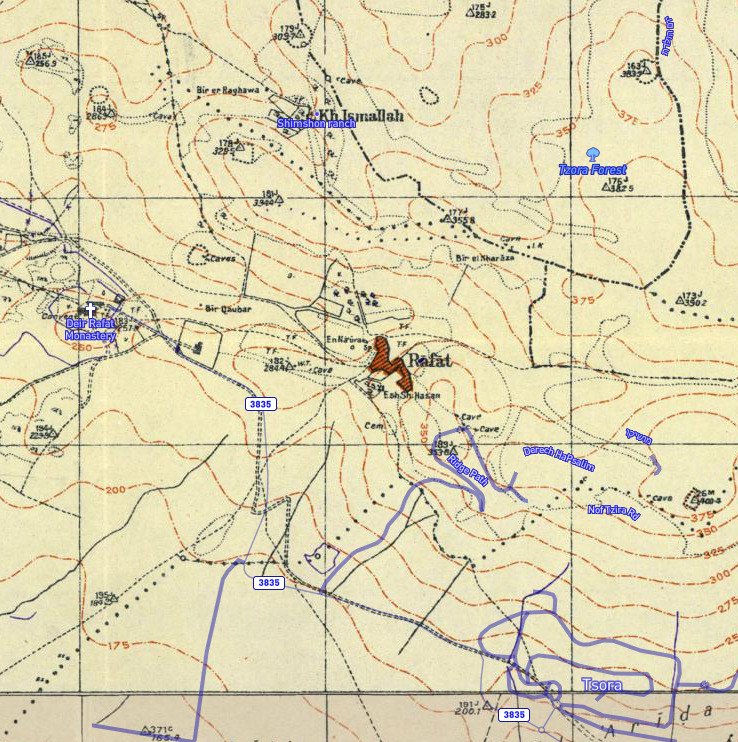
- 1870s map 1940s map modern map 1940s with modern overlay map A series of historical maps of the area around Dayr Rafat (click the buttons)

- Location within Mandatory Palestine
- Coordinates: 31°46′27″N 34°57′31″E
- Palestine grid: 146/131
- Geopolitical entity: Mandatory Palestine
- Subdistrict: Jerusalem
- Date of depopulation: July 18, 1948

Population (1945)
  - Total: 430
- Cause(s) of depopulation: Military assault by Yishuv forces
- Current Localities: Givat Shemesh

Dayr Rafat was a Palestinian Arab village in the Jerusalem Subdistrict. It was located 26 km west of Jerusalem. It was depopulated during the 1948 Arab–Israeli War by the Harel Brigade.

== History ==
In 1883, the PEF's Survey of Western Palestine described Dayr Rafat as a small hamlet situated on a ridge with a spring to the west.

=== British Mandate era ===
In the 1931 census, there were 218 people living in Dayr Rafat.

In The 1945 statistics the village had a population of 430 inhabitants; 330 Muslims and 100 Christians. with a total of 13,242 dunums of land. Of this, 216 dunams were for irrigable land or plantations, 10,563 for cereals, while 10 dunams were built-up land.

The village had a mosque named for al-Hajj Hasan and three khirbas.

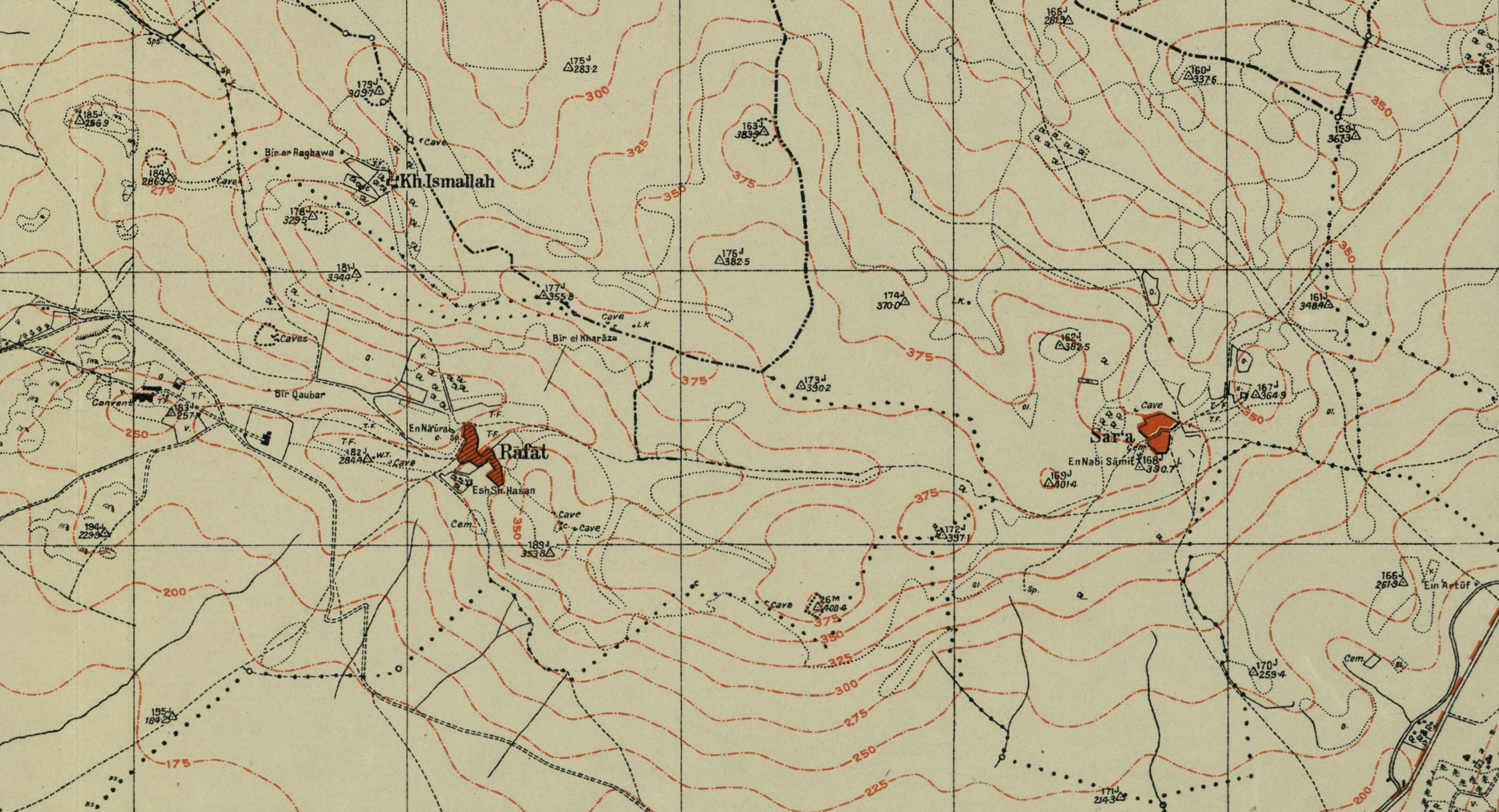
Dayr Rafat 1942 1:20,000

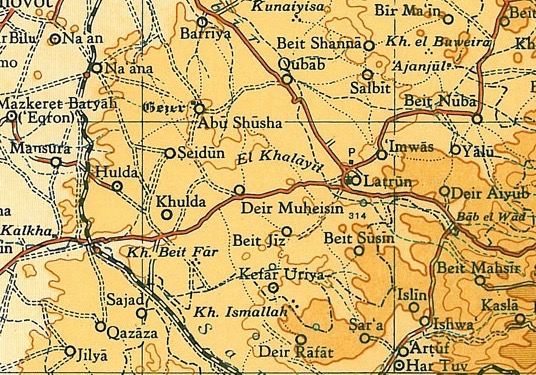
Dayr Rafat 1945 1:250,000

=== 1948 Arab–Israeli War ===
Dayr Rafat, along with four other villages, were overtaken by the Israeli Harel Brigade on 17–18 July 1948 in Operation Dani. The villages had been on the front line since April 1948 and most of the inhabitants of these villages had already left the area. Many of those who stayed fled when Israeli forces attacked and the few who remained at each village were expelled. Over the next three months the Israeli army carried out a program of blowing up and demolishing abandoned villages in the area, this included Dayr Rafat.

In 1992 the village site was described: "The site is covered with large piles of stone rubble and stone terraces; some of the latter are still intact, while others have been destroyed and are now mixed with the rubble of the houses. Cactuses grow on the northwestern edge of the site. There are a few tents belonging to the Negev tribe of al-Sani’ the members of which have rented land from the monastery, which owns the village lands. The monastery, located 2 km west of the site, has a large statue of the Virgin Mary at the top of its facade, and parts of the structure are covered with red tiles. There is a spring on the western edge of the village and a cemetery lies in the south; one large tomb stands out. To the west there is a large olive grove."

== Bibliography ==
- Conder, C.R.; Kitchener, H.H. (1883). The Survey of Western Palestine: Memoirs of the Topography, Orography, Hydrography, and Archaeology. Vol. 3. London: Committee of the Palestine Exploration Fund.
- Department of Statistics (1945). Village Statistics, April, 1945. Government of Palestine.
- Hadawi, S. (1970). Village Statistics of 1945: A Classification of Land and Area ownership in Palestine. Palestine Liberation Organization Research Center.
- Khalidi, W. (1992). All That Remains: The Palestinian Villages Occupied and Depopulated by Israel in 1948. Washington D.C.: Institute for Palestine Studies. ISBN 0-88728-224-5.
- Mills, E., ed. (1932). Census of Palestine 1931. Population of Villages, Towns and Administrative Areas. Jerusalem: Government of Palestine.
- Morris, B. (2004). The Birth of the Palestinian Refugee Problem Revisited. Cambridge University Press. ISBN 978-0-521-00967-6.
- Palmer, E. H. (1881). The Survey of Western Palestine: Arabic and English Name Lists Collected During the Survey by Lieutenants Conder and Kitchener, R. E. Transliterated and Explained by E.H. Palmer. Committee of the Palestine Exploration Fund.
