= Swedish University of Agricultural Sciences =

Agricultural university based in Uppsala, Sweden

Coordinates: 59.815°N 17.663°E

- Sveriges lantbruksuniversitet
- Motto: Science and Education for Sustainable Life
- Type: Public university
- Established: 1977; 49 years ago, 1775; 251 years ago as Veterinary Institution
- Chairman: Rolf Brennerfelt
- Vice-Chancellor: Maria Knutson Wedel
- Academic staff: 1,602
- Administrative staff: 1,459
- Students: 4,434
- Undergraduates: 2.570
- Postgraduates: 1,280
- Doctoral students: 528
- Location: Uppsala, Alnarp, Skara, Umeå, Sweden
- Colors: Dark crimson and deep turquoise
- Nickname: SLU
- Website: http://www.slu.se/

The Swedish University of Agricultural Sciences (Swedish Agricultural University; Swedish: Sveriges lantbruksuniversitet; SLU) is a public research university in Sweden. Although its main campus and head office is located in Ultuna, Uppsala, the university has several campuses in different parts of Sweden; the other main facilities being Alnarp in Lomma Municipality, Skara, and Umeå.

Unlike other state-owned universities in Sweden, SLU is funded through the budget for the Ministry of Enterprise and Innovation (previously the Ministry for Rural Affairs). In 2020, the university had 3,155 full-time staff, 4,216 full-time students, 559 research students and 191 professors.

SLU is a founding member of the Euroleague for Life Sciences (ELLS), established in 2001.

== History ==
The university was formed in 1977 by combining three existing separate colleges for veterinary medicine, forestry and agriculture, as well as some smaller units into one organisation in order to improve the efficiency by sharing resources between departments. At the same time, the Veterinary college and Forestry college were moved from Stockholm to Ultuna, which already was the main campus of the Agricultural college. The locations used by the two relocated colleges are today used by the Stockholm University.

These colleges had a long history as separate institutions. The Veterinary Institution in Skara was founded in 1775 and was headed by Peter Hernqvist, a student of both Carl von Linné and of Claude Bourgelat, who founded the first veterinary college in Lyon in 1762. From 1821 a new veterinary institution in Stockholm took over the training of veterinarians from Skara. The Institute of Forestry was founded in Stockholm in 1828 to provide higher education to those who had gone through practical forestry schools, and was made into a college 1915. An agricultural institute was founded in Ultuna in 1848 and in Alnarp in 1862, under the supervision of the Royal Swedish Academy of Agriculture, founded in 1813. These institutes, and the experimental activities conducted by the academy from 1814, were the basis of the Agricultural College, which was created in 1932.

Founded by Sören Wibe, the Journal of Forest Economics (ISSN 1104-6899) was published by Elsevier, in affiliation with the Department of Forest Economics. In 2019, the journal was acquired by Now Publishers.

== Organization and administration ==
SLU is organized into four faculties:

1. Faculty of Landscape Planning, Horticulture and Agricultural Sciences
2. Faculty of Natural Resources and Agriculture Sciences
3. Faculty of Veterinary Medicine and Animal Science
4. Faculty of Forest Sciences

== Rankings ==
University rankings

Global – Overall
- ARWU World: 301–400 (2024)
- THE World: 351–400 (2025)

SLU is included in international subject rankings for agriculture, forestry, veterinary science, ecology, and environmental science:

- In the 2023 QS World Ranking by Subject, SLU places 3rd in Agriculture and Forestry, 25 in Veterinary Science, and 74 in Environmental Science.
- In the 2023 ARWU Global Ranking of Academic Subjects, SLU places 6th in Ecology, 10th in Agricultural Sciences, 23 in Veterinary Sciences, 44 in Geography, 51-75 in Environmental Science & Engineering, 76-100 in Oceanography, and 76-100 in Water Resources.

== Notable alumni ==
- Refaat El-Sayed, Swedish-Czechoslovak businessman and 1985 Swede of the Year, known for leading Fermenta in the 1980s
- Aneth David, Tanzanian biotechnologist
- Professor Anna Tibaijuka, Tanzanian Minister of Lands, Housing and Human Settlements and former executive director of UN–HABITAT
- Dan H. Yaalon, soil scientist and professor

== See also ==
- Umeå University
- Uppsala University
- List of universities in Sweden
- List of forestry universities and colleges
- Lund University
