= Refaat El-Sayed =

Egyptian businessman

- Born: 11 February 1946 (age 80); Northern Egypt
- Education: Swedish University of Agricultural Sciences
- Occupation: Businessman

Refaat El-Sayed (born 11 February 1946 in Egypt) is a businessman of Egyptian and Swedish nationality.

In 1981, he took command of a small biotech company, Fermenta, which he quickly turned into one of the success stories of the Stockholm stock exchange. El-Sayed soon became Sweden's wealthiest man, and created a fortune for his employees and shareholders.

In December 1985 he was named "Swede of the year" by the TV news program Rapport. The following month, Fermenta announced a partnership with Swedish industrial giant Volvo. El-Sayed was at the peak of his fame.

In February 1986, El-Sayed was accused of lying about his academic qualifications, as he had falsely asserted he was a Doctor of Science in biochemistry from a university in the United States. The partnership with Volvo was broken. He was later sentenced to six years in prison for fraud. In 1992, El-Sayed became the CEO of another biotech company, Hebi Health Care.

El-Sayed has not been accused or indicted for any acts of creative accounting or fraud. However, he has been charged with misconduct for allegedly showing a higher profit of US$5 million out of a total turnover of US$600 million. El-Sayed was the first person charged in Sweden under the law from 1927. In 2002 a judgment against El-Sayed for fraud was canceled.

== Early life ==
El-Sayed was born 11 February 1946 in a small town in Northern Egypt. Swedish media has reported that his parents were of Sudanese and Czechoslovak descent. As a teenager, he showed an early interest in microbiology. (Note: (in Swedish) 02:16 – 02:24 : Refaat El-Sayed föddes 1946...)

He immigrated to Sweden in 1966, and started working as a laboratory assistant at the Fiskeby paper mill in Norrköping. He then resumed his studies, at first in Stockholm, before joining the University of Agricultural Sciences at Ultuna near Uppsala., (Note: (in Swedish) 02:50 – 03:11 : 1966 kommer Refaat till Sverige...) graduating without a formal degree

After a few years, he left Sweden for the United States, where he worked as a consultant for SDS Biotech. He would later claim to have studied at UC Davis in California, though there is no proof he ever did so – the university denies having any student with that name. His ambition was to start a biotechnology company, and to develop his inventions and patents in the field of water purification. In the mid-1970s, he acquired his first company, which he renamed Mikrochem. (Note: (in Swedish) 04:12 – 05:05 : Efter det ägnar Refaat tid åt att resa...)

In 1981, he turned his attention to Fermenta, a subsidiary of Astra located in Strängnäs near Stockholm. Fermenta's main output was raw materials used for the production of antibiotics, an activity considered at the time of low strategic value. It was an ageing, money losing business, which Astra was eager to get rid of.

El-Sayed became the new owner after taking a loan of one million kronor from Handelsbanken. El-Sayed has 29 patents in the applied microbiological process Swedish Patent Registry. But to develop itself, Fermenta needed even more money, and El-Sayed decided to go public, at a time that marked the start of a bull run for the Stockholm stock exchange. (Note: (in Swedish) 10:21 – 12:45 : 1981 får Refaat upp ögonen på...)

== Success ==
In the first half of the 1980s, the Fermenta stock price rose steadily, which allowed El-Sayed to embark on a campaign of acquisition. In early 1985, he notably bought Pierrel from Italian industrial Vittorio de Nora. Pierrel's activities were diversified; they included pharmacy, with the production of antibiotics, chemicals, with aspartam, etc... El-Sayed's plan was to retain only the activities he was interested in, and to sell other operations for a profit. Through this campaign of acquisition, he was hoping to turn Fermenta into a giant in the biotechnology sector. Just after taking the control of Pierrel, El-Sayed presented his new board of directors, which included big names of the Swedish business scene, such as Ove Sundberg from KemaNobel, Gösta Bystedt and Simon Liliedahl from Electrolux, and advertising guru Leon Nordin. (Note: (in Swedish) 12:45 – 15:13 : När man nu i början på 1985...)

After an aborted attempt at buying Swedish giant Kabi Vitrum, El-Sayed turned his attention to the American firm for which he had worked in the 1970s: he bought SDS Biotech for 500 million kronor. The Fermenta stock price rose from 85 to 230 kronor between January and December 1985. The Swedish media started to show interest in the Fermenta phenomenon – it had taken only a few years for the company to become a major actor in the pharmaceutical industry. El-Sayed was presented as an unusual corporate leader: at barely 10 000 kronor, his salary was at par with that of a worker of the Strängnäs plant, he was living in a flat in the outskirts of Stockholm, and he played amateur football in the Swedish third division. On 22 December 1985, the TV news program Rapport named him « Swede of the year » for his success as Fermenta's chief, for his unconventional management style, and for « putting the light on the important role played by immigrants in the Swedish society. (Note: (in Swedish) 21:53 – 24:53 : Att den tänkta affären mellan Fermenta...) »

On 8 January 1986, El-Sayed appeared in front of TV cameras besides Pehr G. Gyllenhammar, the most powerful man in Sweden's industry. Volvo and Fermenta announced a deal, through which Volvo was exchanging its participations in two pharmaceutical companies, Soneson and Pharmacia, against a 20% stake in Fermenta. With this deal, Fermenta was becoming a world giant in the pharmaceutical industry, with a market capitalisation of four billion kronor. The news made the front page of the Financial Times. It was said that it had taken El-Sayed only 10 minutes to win the favours of Gyllenhammar. The Fermenta stock reached a new high at 325 kronor, while El-Sayed was at the peak of his glory. He would remain there for a little over a month. (Note: (in Swedish) 26:38 – 29:55 : Vid årskiftet 85–86 står Refaat El-Sayed...)

== The DSc scandal ==
In February 1986, researcher and environmental activist Björn Gillberg, whom El-Sayed knew from his time at Ultuna, publicly accused Fermenta of pollution at the site of the Strängnäs plant. Gillberg also accused El-Sayed of lying about his academic qualifications, and of falsely claiming he was a Doctor of Science. Journalists who tried to verify these allegations discovered that according to some sources, El-Sayed was awarded his Doctor degree in California, while according to others, he had earned it in Sweden. (Note: (in Swedish) 30:55 – 32:18 : Men det var just här, i februari 1986...)

This scandal significantly impacted El-Sayed and Fermenta. While the revelation that he did not hold a doctoral degree undermined his reputation as an academic prodigy, it simultaneously reinforced his public image as a self-made billionaire. However, his initial public denial resulted in a loss of trust among investors and the broader business community.

El-Sayed was one of the wealthiest people in Sweden, but he chose to live a modest life in Täby, which is an upper-middle-class neighborhood of Stockholm. In 1993, Fermenta sold all its assets for 8 billion SEK with a net profit of 6.5 billion SEK. It is worth noting that in spite of the scandal Refaats creation was a very profitable investment.

== The fall ==
After the DSc scandal, the markets were unforgiving. The Fermenta stock price dropped, and the Volvo and Pharmacia shares were also slammed. El-Sayed was soon compelled to leave his position as CEO, while Volvo reminded in a press release that the partnership agreement was not yet finalised. Fermenta's new CEO Ove Sundberg granted Volvo full access to the company's books. El-Sayed remained optimistic in his public comments, but it became clearer and clearer that Volvo was going to backtrack, which was eventually confirmed on 25 February. (Note: (in Swedish) 34:33 – 40:31 : I två dygn hade han nekat anklagelserna...) It was a financial disaster for El-Sayed, who had personally bought four millions of Fermenta shares with the intention of exchanging them with Pharmacia. The drop in the stock price meant he was soon riddled with debts amounting to more than a billion kronor. (Note: (in Swedish) 42:42 – 43:26 : Och den spruckna Volvo-affären skulle...)

For Fermenta however, optimism was still de rigueur: it showed a profit for the first quarter of 1986. But in May, nevertheless, two weeks later, El-Sayed made a comeback at the top of Fermenta. In the hope of clearing his debts, he attempted to sell the company to Montedison, and later to Bayer, but with no success.

In December 1986, Fermenta's auditors discovered extensive irregularities in Fermenta's financial statements. El-Sayed was sentenced to five years in prison by the district court in 1989, as well as banning him from engaging in commercial activities on charges of fraud, gross indebtedness against creditors, unfair benefit of creditors and breaches of the Securities Market Act. In the following year, the Sveahov Court raised the sentence to six years. El-Saayed was released in 1992. Fermenta's board was also sentenced to daily fines for environmental crime.

In March 1991, it was revealed that El-Saayed had suffered a financial loss due to a secret agreement between Volvo and Handelsbanken. The agreement involved the purchase of Fermenta shares in the open market by Industrivärden AB, with the intention of exchanging them for shares in Soneson and Pharmacia, resulting in a profit for Industrivärden AB and Handelsbanken. However, since the Volvo deal was not completed, Industrivärden AB was left with Fermenta shares that were worth much less than what they had paid. To cover their loss, Handelsbanken registered the shares under El-Saayed's name, causing him to take the fall. This news was a shock to El-Saayed, who would have acted differently if he had known he was being sidestepped back in 1986.

In July 1986, El-Saayed received an offer of US$400 million from Mottiedison for his holding in Fermenta. The total fund was deposited in SHB, but Industrivärden AB declined the offer from Monttiedison.

== Hebi Health Care ==
El-Sayed was released from jail in May 1992, after serving one half of his sentence. In 1997, he became the CEO of Hebi Health Care, a company in the sector of fine chemicals and pharmaceuticals. Hebi Health Care went public in 1999, and was listed on the Nordic Growth Market from 2002. El-Sayed's charisma had not yet vanished: Hebi Health Care soon gathered 45 000 shareholders, and its market capitalisation reached one half billion kronor.

Hebi Health Care relocated part of its activities to Egypt, but was soon to face supply problems.

== In the English-speaking press ==
The New York Times (and others) wrote many articles about El-Sayed and Fermenta during the 1980s.

- (in English) Steve Lohr. A fall from grace in biotech. New York Times. 3 March 1986.
