= Rafat Albadr =

Rafat Albdr رأفت البدر
- Born: Rafat Albdr; July 8, 1978 (age 47)
- Origin: Baghdad, Iraq
- Occupations: Musician, CEO of Music Al Remas TV
- Years active: 2005–present
- Labels: Music Box; Al-Nazaer; Stallions; Music Master; Relax-In; Rotana Platinum Records (mbc), Star Casablanca and Music Al Remas TV

Rafat Albdr (Arabic: رأفت البدر; born July 8, 1978) is an Iraqi music director and producer, founder, and CEO of Music Al Remas TV. He began directing song clips, and in 2013 he established Al-Ramas Music Production Group. He directed song clips. He also directed the film Long Absence in 2017 and will direct the film The Journey in 2019.

== Filmography ==
Year	Title	Role	Notes
2017	Taal Elaab	M&M	Film

== Discography ==
=== Studio albums ===
- 2008: la la
- 2009: wenaak
- 2011: bs laa
- 2015: ashbk
- 2016: ared ahdnak
- 2016: shasawy
- 2017: welak lali
- 2017: aenta baas

=== Live albums ===
- 2009: wenaak
- 2015: ashbk
- 2016: shasawy
- 2017: taela
- 2017: malak anfasi
