= Rafat Bazoo =

Syrian television and voice actor (born 1965)

- رأفت بازو
- Born: January 31, 1965 (age 61); Syria
- Occupation: Actor - Voice acting
- Years active: 1993–present

Rafat Bazoo (Arabic: رأفت بازو; born January 31, 1965 in Syria) is a Syrian television actor and voice actor.

== Early life ==
He was born in Syria and has worked with Venus Center for Dubbing since 1993 in many of anime and cartoon.

== Business ==
=== Anime ===
- Dragon Ball
- Slam Dunk - Kaede Rukawa
- Naruto - Sasuke Uchiha
- Detective Conan
- Fist of the North Star - Kenshiro
- Clamp School Detectives - Nokoru Imonoyama
- Romeo's Blue Skies - Rossi, Giovanni
- Gad Guard
- Flame of Recca - Recca
- Inuyasha
- Doraemon (1979)
- Ranma 1/2 - Jusenkyo Guide
