= Rahat Khan (field hockey) =

Pakistani field hockey player and league official

Personal information
- Born: British India

Rahat Khan is a Pakistani field hockey player and league official.

She was featured in an episode of the BBC Four programme India’s Frontier Railways while travelling with a girls' hockey team to a tournament in India. She was known as the "Hockey Queen" since 1985 for her prowess. In 1996, she received the "Best Sportswoman" trophy from the Pakistan Railways (PR). She played and worked for the PR's hockey association for 12 years as a player and trainer. As of 2017, she is secretary of the Pakistani Punjab's Women's Hockey Association and manager of the Punjab's Under-19 girls' team. Her son has no interest in hockey, showing only an interest in cricket.

Her sister, Sarwat Khan was also a Pakistani field hockey player.
