= Ahmed Hussein (Egyptian politician) =

Egyptian politician (1911–1982)

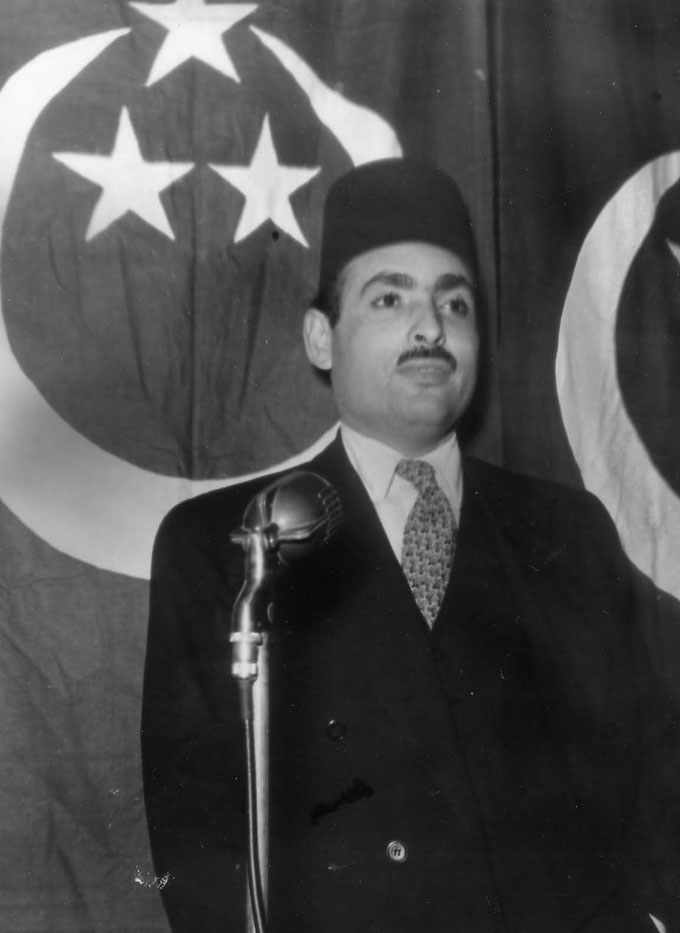
- Hussein during the inauguration of Young Egypt in 1933
- Born: Ahmed Mahmoud Hussein; 8 March 1911; Cairo, Sultanate of Egypt
- Died: 27 September 1982 (aged 71); Egypt
- Occupation: Lawyer
- Years active: 1929–1969
- Known for: Founder of Young Egypt Party
- Relatives: Adel Hussein (brother)

Ahmed Hussein (8 March 1911 – 27 September 1982) was an Egyptian lawyer and politician who founded an Egyptian nationalist party, Young Egypt, in the 1930s.

== Early life and education ==
Hussein was born on 8 March 1911. His father, Mahmoud Hussein, was a civil servant at the Ministry of Finance. The family was from Kafr El Battikh near Damietta and had lands in Lower Egypt.

Hussein received religious education and a degree in law.

== Career and political activities ==
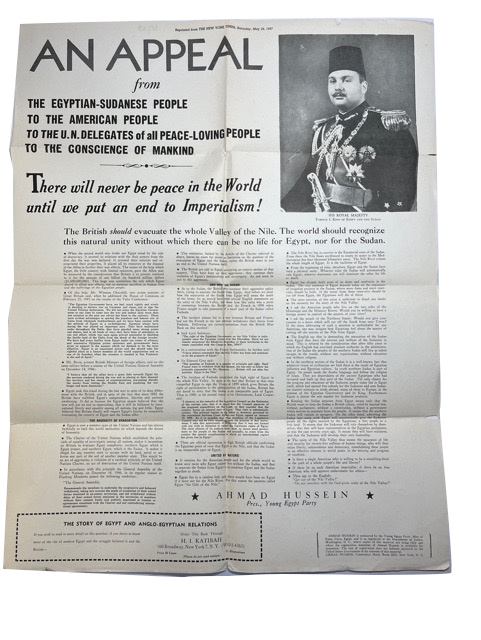
A poster written by Ahmad Hussein arguing for the independence of Egypt with Sudan and the evacuation of British troops.

Hussein started a magazine entitled Al Sarkha (Arabic: Scream) in which he published a program of his political group, "Society of the Free Youth, Supporters of the Treaty", endorsing Prime Minister Mohamed Mahmoud's negotiations with the British. The group included the nationalist Egyptian figures led by Hussein's friend Fathi Radwan. The society's slogan was "God, Homeland, and King", and aimed at reviving Egyptian nationalism, especially after Egypt experienced negative outcomes of the global economic crisis of 1929. In late 1931, a committee of students headed by Ahmad Hussein initiated the Piastre Plan to raise funds to improve the industry in the country. They managed to collect the funds and employed them to set up a fez factory.

The name Young Egypt first appeared in 1929, and then the features of this national society began to take shape during the “Piaster Project.” In October 1933. The “Young Egypt” society was formed and officially announced under the presidency of “Ahmed Hussein.” It adopted the newspaper “Al-Sarkha” as its mouthpiece. The Society of the Free Youth, Supporters of the Treaty was reestablished as a political party, Young Egypt, on 21 October 1933. Hussein was arrested in July 1941 due to his extreme nationalist activities. He escaped while he was being treated at a hospital, but in November 1942 he surrendered himself to the police. In 1944 he was released from prison. In July 1946 Hussein was again arrested with other Young Egypt party members following the headline of the party newspaper, Al-Ishtrakia, as "Revolt, Revolt, Revolt!" They were freed on bail soon.

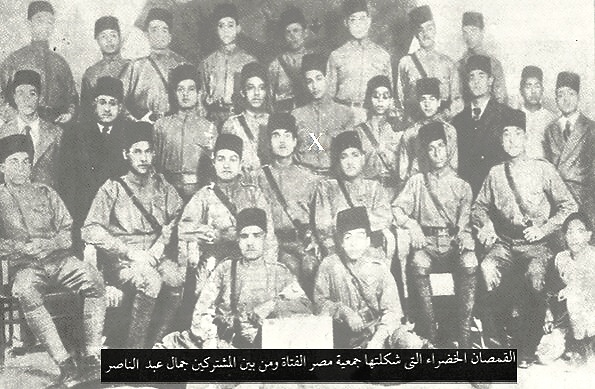
Green Shirts of Young Egypt party including Gamal Abdel-Nasser at center (marked x)

Hussein renamed his party as the Egyptian Social Democratic Party in the late 1940s, and later it was renamed as the National Islamic Party. In the 1950s his brother and a member of the Young Egypt party, Adel Hussein, joined a communist party, namely Haditu.

== Later life and death ==
Hussein had a stroke in 1969 and retired from public life. He died at age 71 on 27 September 1982 after he had been hospitalized because of heart problems.
