= Al Shaab (newspaper) =

Newspaper in Cairo, Egypt (1979–2020)

- Type: Daily newspaper
- Owner: Egyptian Islamic Labour Party
- Founded: 1979
- Ceased publication: May 2000
- Language: Arabic
- Headquarters: Cairo

Al Shaab (in Arabic الشعب meaning The People) was the official newspaper of the Egyptian Islamic Labour Party (formerly known as the Socialist Labour Party). The paper existed between 1979 and 2000.

== History and profile ==
Al Shaab was started in 1979, and the first issue appeared on 1 May 1979. The paper initially advocated a mix of socialism and pan-Arabism-nationalism similar to that advocated by Nasser. Al Shaab considered the stay of the former Iranian ruler, Shah Mohammad Reza Pahlavi, in Egypt in 1979 as having negative consequences for Egypt's national interests.

From 1985 to 1993, the paper was edited by Adel Hussein, a Marxist turned political Islamist. In May 1993 Adel Hussein resigned from the editorship to become general secretary of the Socialist Labour Party, and was succeeded as editor by his nephew Magdi Hussein.

The newspaper's oppositional Islamism repeatedly brought it into confrontation with government authorities in Egypt. In 1993 Abd Al-Munim Gamal Al-Din Abd Al-Munim from Al Shaab was jailed for several years under indefinite detention for "insulting religion" and "publishing indecent photographs". Shortly afterwards the newspaper's military correspondent Abdel-Sattar Abu Hussein was held in a military prison for allegedly publishing "top secret information", Hilmi Murad was held overnight in a police station for criticising a cabinet minister, and Adel Hussein spent 25 days in police custody after anti-government literature was supposed to have been found on his plane seat. On 24 February 1998, the editor-in-chief and a cartoonist of the paper was sentenced to one year in prison at hard labor due to libeling the sons of a former interior minister, Hassan Al Alfi.

In 2000 Al Shaab printed a hostile review of Haidar Haidar's book A Banquet for Seaweed, which had been reissued by the Ministry of Culture as part of its Modern Arab Classics series. Criticising the government for thereby promoting "rank atheism and blasphemy", the review helped spark a riot at Al-Azhar University, and the newspaper kept up pressure by denouncing secular literary figures including Tayeb Salih. The government responded by arresting some junior Ministry of Culture figures for "assaulting revealed religion", shutting down Al Shaab, and banning Haidar's book. On 29 May 2000 the paper was again closed down following the freezing of the activities of the Socialist Labour Party.

== See also ==
- List of newspapers in Egypt
