= Rahat (supermarket) =

Supermarket chain

RAHAT
- Type: Private
- Industry: Retail
- Founded: 2009; 17 years ago
- Headquarters: Azerbaijan
- Key people: Samir Abdullayev
- Products: Supermarkets
- Owner: “ANC GROUP” MMC
- Website: https://www.rahatmarket.az/

RAHAT is a supermarket chain operating in Azerbaijan.

== History ==
Established in 2009 as part of "ANC GROUP" LLC, the Rahat supermarket chain operates with a constant focus on enhancing customer satisfaction and improving service quality. The company's primary goal is to provide high-level customer service and offer quality products at affordable prices. "ANC GROUP" LLC, which includes the Rahat supermarkets, also actively works to improve the financial and social well-being of its employees, enhance working conditions, develop future plans, and invest in promising young talents.

In addition to Rahat Supermarkets, the company has also introduced “Port Baku Bazar”, Azerbaijan’s first premium segment store, and the specially designed “Rahat Gourmet Markets”, which offer high-quality products tailored for true gourmets.

All branches are equipped with the latest technological equipment, including next-generation self-service checkout systems – a first in Azerbaijan.

Continuously embracing innovation and shaping its development strategy according to market demands, the Rahat supermarket chain operates a modern logistics center located on Baku Ring Road in the Garadagh district, serving nearly 200,000 customers daily.

== Number of stores ==
The Rahat supermarket chain operates with 110 stores across various regions, including the capital city Baku and surrounding villages, as well as Khirdalan, Barda, Yevlakh, Tovuz, Ismayilli, Sheki, Aghdam, Khankendi, Zangilan, Lachin, Lankaran, Masalli, Hajigabul, and others.
