= Ibrahim Shoukry =

Egyptian politician (1916–2008)

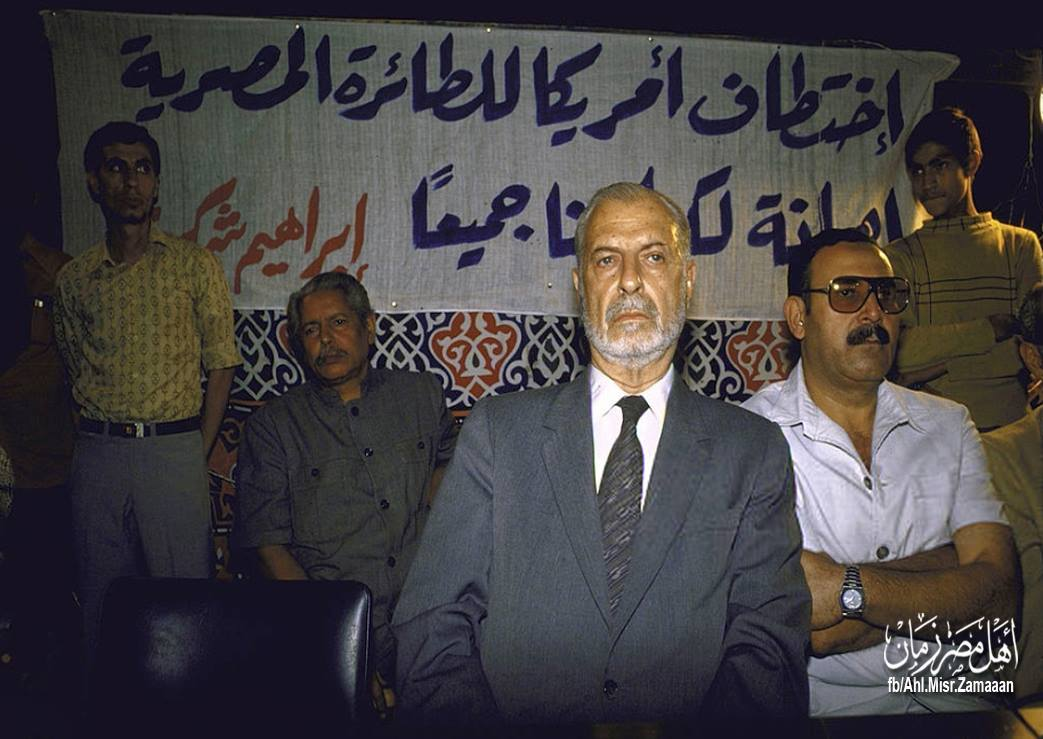
Ibrahim Shoukry and the Egyptian Labour party demonstration in 1985

Ibrahim Shoukry (22 September 1916 – 5 August 2008) was an Egyptian politician. He established the Socialist Labour Party in 1978.

== Early life and education ==
Shoukry was born on September 22, 1916, in Cairo to a wealthy well-reputed Egyptian family, son of Mahmoud Shoukry.

He graduated from the Faculty of Agriculture at Cairo University in 1937.

== Military service ==
He fought against the British occupation of Egypt and was named the alive martyr Al Shaheed Al Hay as he was wounded among other friends who were killed in the student demonstrations against the British occupiers in 1935.

== Political career ==
He was first elected to parliament in 1945, as the youngest member. Later he was imprisoned for his articles against King Farouk of Egypt in 1952 whilst in parliament. In July 1952 members of the Egyptian army ousted Farouk, and Shoukry was freed to continue his journey in public service.

He was re-elected to Parliament and proposed the laws of agricultural reform to benefit deprived farmers, giving away acres of land that he owned himself. He was a pioneer of cultivating desert land expanding Egypt's agricultural activity from the confines of the narrow Nile Delta and valley.

In 1974 he was appointed as Governor of Al Wadi Al Gadeed (the New Valley Governorate). He was Minister of Agriculture and Cultivation until his resignation in 1978 to found the Socialist Labour Party.

He was elected to parliament in 1978, 1984 and 1987, where he led the coalition of opposition parties against the ruling National Democratic Party headed by the then Egyptian President Hosni Mubarak. Shoukry remained Head of the Labour Party until the Egyptian Government, supported by emergency law imposed since the beginning of Mubarak's rule in 1981, suspended the party and its official newspaper Al-Shaab (The People) in 2000 because of its fierce opposition of Mubarak's policies.

== Personal life and death ==
Shoukry gradually retreated from public life because of ill health until his death on 5 August 2008 at the age of 92.
