= Egyptian Islamic Labour Party =

Labour Party حزب العمل Hizb al-ʿamal
- Founder: Ahmed Hussein; Ibrahim Shoukry
- Founded: 1978
- Preceded by: Young Egypt Party
- Headquarters: Cairo
- Newspaper: Al Shaab (currently suspended)
- Ideology: Before 1986: Democratic Socialism; Socialism; After 1986: Islamic socialism Islamism
- Political position: Left-wing
- National affiliation: Anti-Coup Alliance
- Colors: Green; Blue
- Slogan: God... the People الله... الشعب
- House of Representatives: 0 / 568

The Islamic Labour Party (Arabic: حزب العمل الإسلامي, romanized: Ḥizb al-ʿamal al-islāmī), previously the Socialist Labour Party (Arabic: حزب العمل الإشتراكي, romanized: Ḥizb al-ʿamal al-ishtirākī), Commonly known in Egypt as just the Labour Party, is an Egyptian Socialist-turned Islamist-political party.

The party was suspended in 2000, but later joined the Democratic Alliance for Egypt during the 2011-2012 parliamentary election; it gained one seat in the People's Assembly of Egypt.

== History and ideology ==
The party established on 9 September 1978 by Ibrahim Shoukry and others. It was originally a socialist party. The party is the successor of the Masr Al Fattah Movement, which was founded by Ahmad Hussain in 1933.

Initially established as a Left-wing Socialist party, but ever since 1986 the party has undergone a major ideological change turning into an Islamist party. In 1987 the party formed an alliance, called Tahaluf, with the Muslim Brotherhood and the Liberal Socialists Party. This change was first demonstrated in the party's fifth conference in 1989 which was entitled "Reform from an Islamic perspective".

The party platform calls for:

- Establishing an economic system based on the Islamic Shari'ah.
- Protecting the national industries.
- Equal distribution of investments among the Egyptian governorates.
- Achieving unity between Egypt, Sudan and Libya.
- Liberating the occupied Palestinian lands.
- Promoting ties with developing countries.

=== Sadat's suppression of the party ===
Before the party was anti-Mubarak, it opposed Anwar Sadat heavily through its newspaper and constant protests; this led to most of the head of the party being arrested, which in turn triggered the party's fall in the 1980s.

=== 1990 elections ===
The party and a few others abstained from the election because of an amendment to the 1972 Electoral Law forbidding unified lists, with the Socialist Labour Party attempting to combine with the Muslim Brotherhood in hope to change the Muslim Brotherhood's view on Islam in a more leftist way, but this plan failed when they were suspended in 2000. The Muslim Brotherhood and the Labour Party still remain great allies.

=== 2000 suspension ===
On 20 May 2000, the Egyptian committee for political parties' affairs (the committee responsible for authorizing the formation of political parties in Egypt) decided to freeze the activities of the Labor Party and suspend its newspaper al Shaab. The committee referred to Article 17 of the political parties law, which enables it to suspend the activities of a party, as a means of stopping any decision or act by a party that is contrary to the higher interests of the country. The committee attributed its decision to the split within the party ranks, with one group led by Hamdi Ahmad, a member of the party’s executive committee, and the other led by Ahmad Idris. The committee, in its decision, referred to the official complaint brought by those members concerning the selection of a new party chair. The two party members also asked for Al-Shaab to be suspended from publication and a freeze to be put on the party’s bank account. Labor Party chairman Ibrahim Shoukry described these demands as illegal.

=== The split ===
The Islamic Labour Party was split in June 2011 when some of the leaders of the party created the Arab Unification Party in June 2011.

=== 2011–present ===
The party allied with the Democratic Alliance for Egypt ahead of the 2011–12 Egyptian parliamentary election and gained one seat.

It became part of the Anti-Coup Alliance following the 2013 Egyptian coup d'état.

=== Lawsuit against Islamic parties ===
The Egyptian Islamic Labour Party is one of the eleven Islamic parties targeted by a lawsuit in November 2014, when an organization named Popular Front for opposing the Brotherhoodization of Egypt sought to dissolve all political parties established "on a religious basis." The Alexandria Urgent Matters Court however ruled on 26 November 2014 that it lacked jurisdiction.

== Electoral history ==
=== People's Assembly elections ===
Election	Seats	+/–
2011–12 (as part of Democratic Alliance for Egypt)	1 / 596	▲1

== See also ==
- List of Islamic political parties
