= Akhbar al-Youm =

Akhbar al-Youm (also transliterated Akhbar al-Yom and Akhbar Alyoum) is a newspaper in Sudan. It is the largest Arabic-language daily in the country. It had strong links to the government and distributed 30,000 to 35,000 copies per day as of 2011.
