= Ahmed Rifaat (judge) =

Egyptian judge

Ahmed Rifaat is the presiding judge of the Trials of Hosni, Alaa and Gamal Mubarak following the 2011 Egyptian revolution. He also always says in the details of any case, “I judge based on evidence, documents, and proof, and public opinion will not absolve me when I meet my Lord.”
