= Young Egypt Party =

Political party in Egypt

Young Egypt Party حزب مصر الفتاة Hizb Misr El-Fatah
- Chairman: Abdul Hakim Abdul Majid Khalil
- Founded: 12 October 1989
- Preceded by: Young Egypt Party (not legal predecessor)
- Merged into: Conference Party
- Headquarters: Cairo
- Ideology: Islamic socialism Pan-Arabism
- Religion: Sunni Islam
- House of Representatives: 0 / 568

The Young Egypt Party (Arabic: حزب مصر الفتاة Ḥizb Miṣr al-Fatāh) is an Egyptian political party.

== History and profile ==
The party was established on 12 October 1989. It was legalized in 1990.

The party platform calls for:

- Establishing a parliamentary/presidential ruling system.
- Enhancing the Egyptian-Arab ties.
- Achieving integration with African countries.
- Adopting non-alignment policies.
- Establishing the socialist Islamic economic system and boosting the role of the private sector.

The party fielded seven candidates to run for the 2000 legislative elections.
