= Young Egypt Party (1933) =

Nationalist political party in Egypt (1933–1953)

Young Egypt Party حزب مصر الفتاة
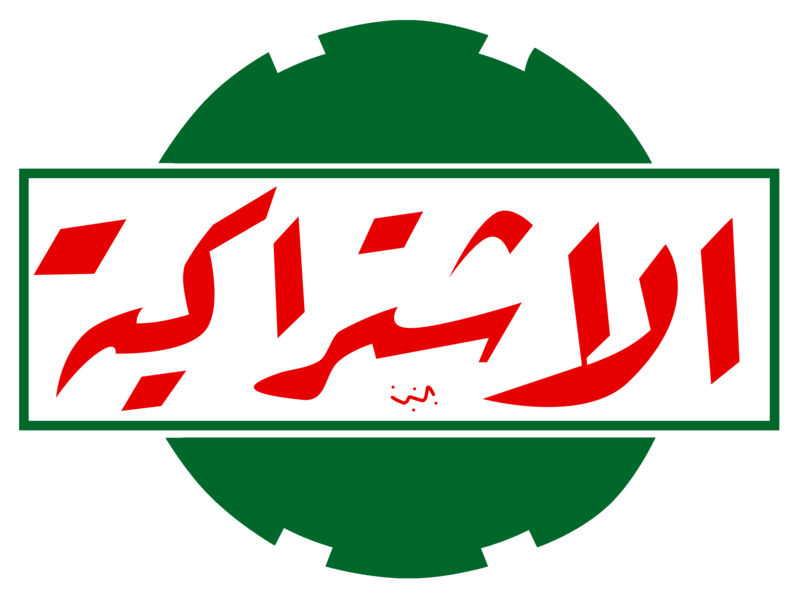
- Chairperson: Ahmed Hussein
- Founded: October 1933 (as organization); 1936 (as political party)
- Dissolved: 1953
- Preceded by: Mashrue al-Qarsh
- Succeeded by: Nationalist Islamic Party
- Headquarters: Cairo
- Newspaper: Al-Sha'ab
- Paramilitary wing: Green Shirts
- Ideology: Fascism; Egyptian ultranationalism Secularism; Agrarianism; Anti-colonialism; Anti-capitalism; Anticommunism; Antisemitism; Anti-Masonry
- Political position: Far-right
- Colours: Green
- Anthem: "To you Egypt, I'll give my Youth"; Arabic: لك يا مصر شبابي

Party flag

The Young Egypt Party (Arabic: حزب مصر الفتاة, Masr El-Fatah) also known as the Green Shirts (Arabic: القمصان الخضراء, el-Komsan el-Khadra) was a fascist Egyptian nationalist political party. It is notable for counting a young Anwar Sadat as a member.

== Historical context ==
in the 19th century, Egypt underwent massive modernization and Westernization, including the construction of the Suez Canal. The Egyptian Khedive, Ismail Pasha, went so far as to say, "My country is no longer in Africa; we are now part of Europe." However, Egypt accumulated an unpayable amount of debt to European creditors, eventually having to create the Caisse de la Dette Publique ("Public Debt Commission") to supervise payments. The growing political influence of the commission angered Ahmed Urabi, an Egyptian officer who led an uprising against the government. It was during this revolt that the famous nationalist phrase, "Egypt for the Egyptians!" was coined. After Egypt's defeat in the 1882 Anglo-Egyptian War, Britain governed Egypt as a "veiled protectorate," with British officials like Evelyn Baring serving as the de facto rulers of Egypt.

During this time, the Egyptian state was morphed into a de facto British colony. Foreigners in Egypt were not subject to Egyptian law, but a separate legal system called the Capitulations. During this time, a new generation of Egyptian nationalists, such as Muhammad Farid and Mustafa Kamil, organized the new liberal nationalist movement in Egypt. A new generation of variably-educated Egyptian nationalists, called the effendi, emerged as the new social class to march Egypt into the modern world. During the 1919 Egyptian revolution, Egyptian nationalists formed the Wafd Party, a liberal nationalist party that dominated the post-1923 constitution Kingdom of Egypt. Major cities like Alexandria and Cairo experienced a major explosion in progressive art and values. Art decos, dancers, movies and nightclubs were established. Women activists like Rose al Yusuf, Safiya Zaghloul, Nabawiyya Musa, Saiza Nabarawi and Doria Shafik fought for women's rights in the socially conservative environment of Egypt. As an example, the Egyptian Feminist Union was founded by Huda Sha'arawi in 1923. Alexanderia and Cairo had large populations of French, Greeks and Italians who contributed to the cosmopolitan atmosphere and culture of the big cities.

However, the new constitution did not turn Egypt into a completely independent nation. The Unilateral Declaration of Egyptian Independence gave Britain several special legal rights in Egypt, including the right to station troops in Egypt, the right to govern the Sudan, and the right to administer the Suez Canal. Britain was still the real power behind the throne. Politically, Egypt was divided between the conservative palace led by the king and his allies and the liberal nationalists led by the Wafd and their allies, with the British acting as the tie breaker. Political parties at the time were not organizations separated by ideology, but political cliques set run by members of the political elite. As the Egyptian writer Tawfiq al-Hakim, said:

"In Egypt there is no party in the true sense of the word, a party as the word is understood and used in genuine democratic regimes. Rather, in Egypt there are separatist factions called parties. None of these factions has a goal other than dividing up the seats in parliament, obtaining government office, and managing election campaigns through passing out ballots. But as for any program, none of them even thinks about it!"

=== Early 1930s ===
The 1929 Great Depression revealed the stark economic disparities between the peasants, the majority underbelly of Egyptian society, and the well-off land-owning elite, motivating social unrest in Egypt.

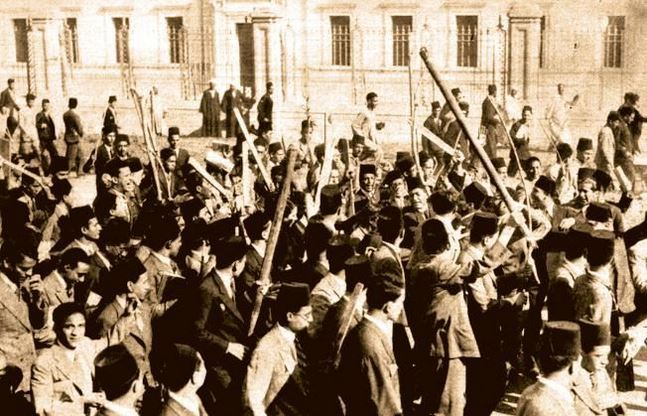
Protesters demanding the retraction of the Constitution of 1930

In 1930, prime minister Ismail Sidqi formed his cabinet. His first major change was the creation of a new constitution, which granted the executive – the King – more powers over the democratically elected parliament. The king had the sole power to propose financial bills, had the power to appoint three-fifths – the majority – of the Senate, and had the power to appoint the leaders of major religious institutions such as the Shiekh of al-Azhar, while the parliament was weaken, such as the lowering of a minimum of parliamentary session to five months instead of six, and the requiring of an absolute majority for ten days for a no-confidence vote to be passed. Opponents of Sidqi, the Wafdist Mustofa el-Nahhas and the Liberal Constitutionalist Muhammed Mahmud, were vehemently opposed to the new constitution, organizing protests against this move. The British backed the 1930 constitution, believing that the re-instatement of the 1923 constitution would bring the Wafd back into power. During the 1935–36 protests in Egypt, the opposition agreed to enter negotiations with Britain, specifically regarding the lack of an Egyptian military, British troop presence, and the Mixed Courts. On 12 December 1935, the new government led by Mohammed Nasim reinstated the 1923 Constitution.

It was during this time in the early 1930s that the local youth leaders organized nationalist outbursts against foreign domination. Local Wafdists demanded the boycott of British good and the encouragement of local industry. On 3 March 1931, a manifesto was published arguing for local industrialists to product Egyptian made products. In 1930, Salama Musa formed the "Society of the Egyptians for Egypt", urging Egyptians to buy Egyptian made products for a re-awakening of the nation's economic consciousness.

== History ==
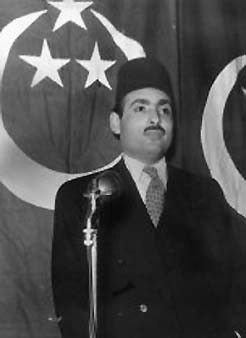
Ahmed Hussein during the inauguration of Young Egypt in 1933

=== Beginning of the party ===
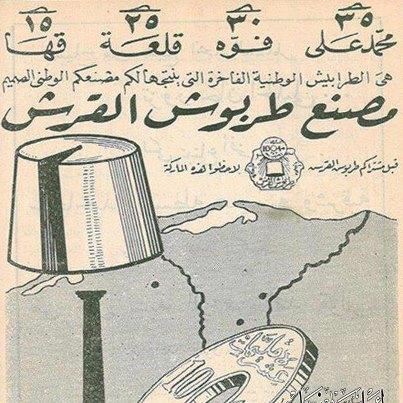
Poster about the Egyptian Fez Factory Project

In late 1931, a committee of students headed by Ahmad Hussein formed the Piastre Plan, which was a drive to raise funds for developing Egyptian industry, using the funds to establish a local fez factory. This was after discovering that the famous Egyptian headdress was produced in a foreign country. Hussein had been a supporter of the Liberal Constitutional Party's leader Muhammed Mahmud Pasha during his last year in secondary school. One of the principles of the party was buying only Egyptian-made products. The party was formed on 12 October 1933 as a nationalist party with "religious elements," by Ahmed Hussein. Its aim was to pursue a more nationalist anti-British policy than the established Egyptian parties. Its name was similar to the nationalist Young Italy and Young Turks parties. Young Egypt emerged as a student organization that existed outside of the control of the traditional Egyptian parties.

=== Involvement in Egyptian politics ===
On 5 December 1935, the party founders Ahmed Hussein and Fathi Radwan left Egypt for Great Britain, where they met with British politicians, spreading the message of Egypt's case against Great Britain, later returning to Egypt as heroes. Young Egypt played a major role in the 1935–36 Egyptian protests. It was during this time that future Egyptian president Gamal Abdel Nasser joined these protests, though whether he was a formal member is debated among historians. Members mostly engaged in street demonstrations, with the most committed wearing a green shirt, the party uniform. The paper – Al-Sarkha – would publish letters to officials and collect signatures in petitions for publicity. In late 1933 Hussein sent an open letter to the British Prime Minister demanding the complete independence of Egypt and the removal of British troops from Egypt and the Sudan; in 1934 Young Egypt collected signatures for a petition to the king demanding the abolition of the Capitulation system and the Mixed Courts of Egypt.

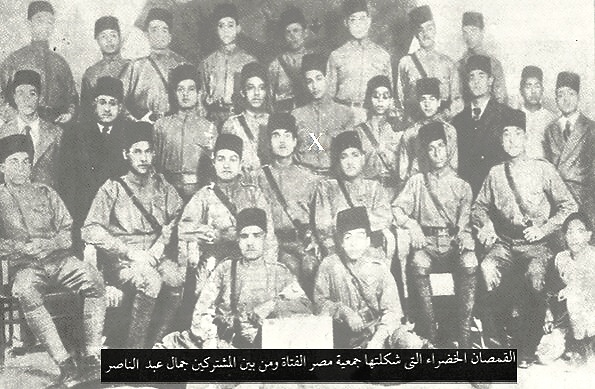
Green Shirts of Young Egypt party, including future Egyptian president Gamal Abdel Nasser, in the 1930s

One of the main issues of the time was to settle the exact relationship between Egypt and Britain, especially regarding the Mixed Courts, the Suez Canal and the stationing of British troops in Egypt. The nationalist slogan had long been "No Negotiation Except After Evacuation!", so when the Wafd Party agreed to seek a compromise with Britain, Hussein wrote "There is no way for us to achieve all except by means of force, physical force". Young Egypt opposed the Anglo-Egyptian Treaty of 1936, because it allowed British troops to be stationed in Egypt for 20 years, in effect legitimizing British domination over Egypt. During the Montreux negotiations of 1937 for the abolition of the capitulatory system in Egypt, Hussein wrote:

"If he [Nahas] had a spark of patriotism, he would prefer to remain in his own house, strong, and to invite the foreigners to come to him. The Capitulations must be abolished. The Mixed Courts must be abolished. But their abolition should occur in Egypt, not in Switzerland, because Egypt is the competent authority, the deciding element, the master in its own house."

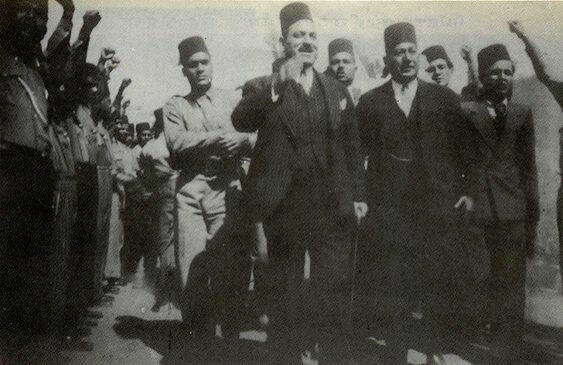
Blue Shirts. Mohammed Bilal and Mustafa al-Nahas (Wafd party).

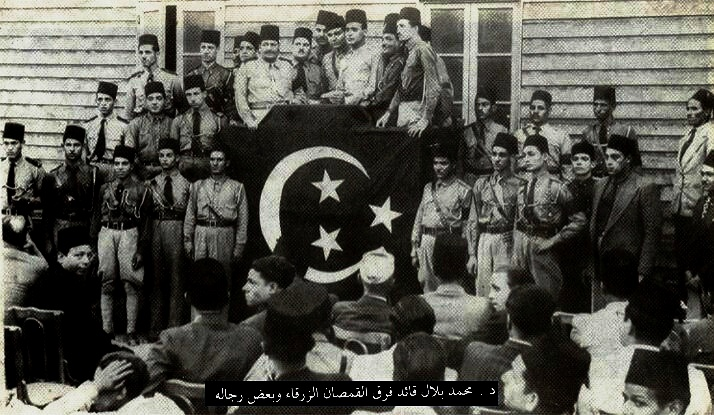
Muhummad Bilal and the Wafd's Blue Shirts

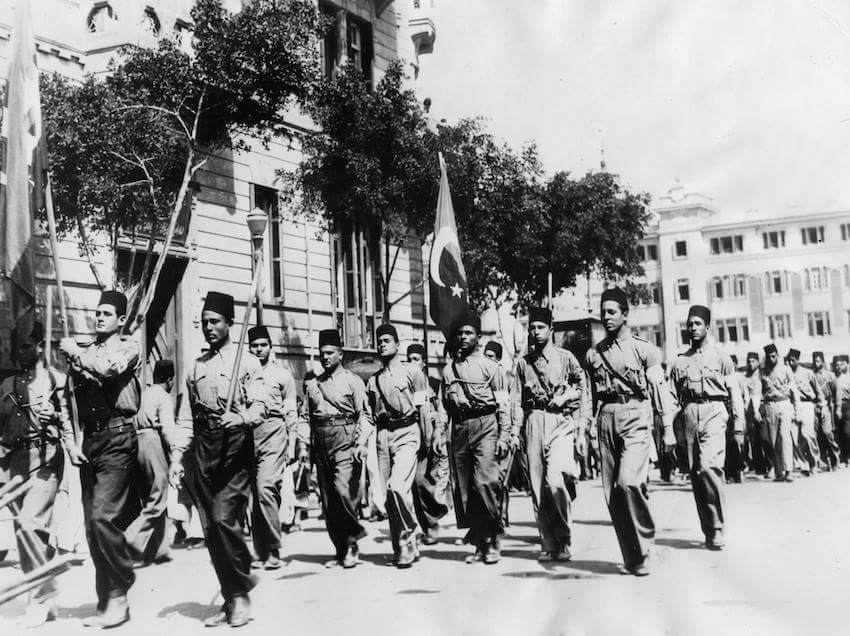
Blue Shirts (Wafd party) Abdeen Palace Parade 1936

The Wafd Party, the mainstream liberal party, viewed Young Egypt with suspicion, believing it to be controlled opposition sponsored by the king. After the Wafd's victory in the 1936 elections, the Wafdist leader Mostafa el-Nahas accused Young Egypt with collaborating with a foreign power, implying Italy. This incited a series of street battles between the Green Shirts and the Blue Shirts – the Blue Shirts being the Wafdist youth branch. Frequent clashes took place between the Green Shirts of Young Egypt and the Blue Shirts of the Wafd, culminating in an unsuccessful attempt on the life of el-Nahas by a member of Young Egypt on 28 November 1937. While there are similarities between the Green Shirts and the fascist paramilitaries of the Italian Blackshirts and Nazi Brownshirts, a key distinction is that Young Egypt's fighters were college students fighting with clubs and bricks – not demobilized, brutally experienced and disillusioned World War I veterans. These "shirt" organizations would participate in marches and street brawls. After numerous incidents of violence between militant students, Egypt banned paramilitary organizations in March 1938.

Despite being formally founded as a party in 1936, Young Egypt never sent representatives to the Egyptian parliament. Until its wartime ban in 1941, the only parliamentary election it could have participated in was in 1938, but none of its members met the minimum age of 30 to run for office. Young Egypt claimed to have almost 2,000 members, though the historian James Jankowski claims that the true number was around one thousand at its peak. It was around this time that Young Egypt began to decline, due to the Wafdist government ordering crackdowns such as preventing meetings and issues fines and arrests for members, ironically under the government of Muhammed Mahmud Pasha, whom Hussein had supported before founding Young Egypt.

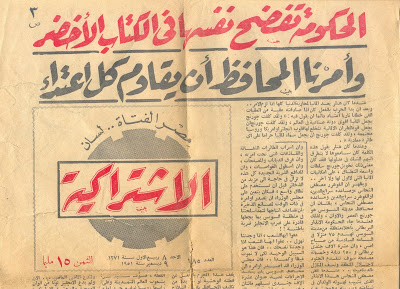
Al-Ishtrakeyia Journal (Young Egypt party)

The group was renamed the Nationalist Islamic Party in 1940, when it took on a more religious, as well as anti-British tone. After the war it was renamed yet again, now the Socialist Party of Egypt. The group's one electoral success came when it sent Ibrahim Shukri, its vice-president, to parliament in 1951. However, it was disbanded, along with all other parties, in 1953 following the 1952 military coup d'état.

After political parties were allowed again in Egypt, Ibrahim Shoukry formed a group, the Socialist Labor Party in 1978, which despite its name look much like the social nationalistic ideology of Young Egypt. It consists of members from different economic and social levels.

=== Ideology ===
Young Egypt espoused the most extreme Egyptian nationalism of the time, going further than any other existing party. It believed in the complete rejection of foreign influence. One of its Ten Principles was to "cling steadfastly to your nationality, making it an obsession." Ahmed Hussein saw in his vision of Egypt a country that has only been recently held back by foreigners, and that should return to its former glory, saying:

"I will tell you, gentlemen, a reality which I discovered in Europe. It is that most of its peoples are close to the primitive, primal stages of life. The only thing responsible for their progress in life is the great amount of learning which they receive all over Europe. Their knowledge, their character, their virtues, their peculiarities – all of these have been acquired by striving and only by that. This means that if you strip from them this learning and this knowledge which they have won through striving and study, you will find Europeans close to the barbarism of prehistoric times."

Hussein believed that while Europe had abandoned religion for "godless, materialist principles", modern Egypt's religious culture made it superior. This was in stark contrast to the Wafd, who were secularists. Young Egypt railed against foreign-owned factories, "anti-Islamic" entertainment, gambling, cinemas and alcohol. Young Egypt combined the religious values of the Egyptian urban worker with the nationalist values of the modern Egyptian student.

== Bibliography ==
- Abdalla, Ahmed (1985). The Student Movement and national politics in Egypt: 1923–1973. London: Al Saqi books. ISBN 9780863561177.
- Deeb, Marius (1979). Party Politics in Egypt: the Wafd & its rivals 1919–1939. Ithaca Press : London: The Middle East Centre St Antony’s College Oxford. ISBN 9780903729406.
- Erlich, Haggai (1989). Students and University in 20th Century Egyptian Politics. Routledge. ISBN 9781135778989.
- Hengshuo, Zhang (2024). "A Study of the Establishment and Development of the Young Egypt Association". Journal of Sociology and Ethnology. 6 (1): 158–163. doi:10.23977/jsoce.2024.060121.
- Jankowski, James; Gershoni, Israel (2010). "The Young Egypt Movement: An Egyptian Version of Fascism?". Confronting Fascism in Egypt : Dictatorship Versus Democracy in the 1930s. Stanford University Press. ISBN 978-0-8047-6343-1.
- Jankowski, James; Gershoni, Israel (1995). Redefining the Egyptian nation, 1930–1945. Cambridge Middle East Studies. ISBN 9780521475358.
- Jankowski, James P. (1975). Egypt's Young Rebels: 'Young Egypt': 1933–1952. Hoover Institution Press. ISBN 9780817914516.
- Jankowski, James P. (1970). "The Egyptian Blue Shirts and the Egyptian Wafd, 1935–1938". Middle Eastern Studies. 6 (1): 77–95. doi:10.1080/00263207008700139. JSTOR 4282308.
- Jankowski, James P. (1967). The Young Egypt party and Egyptian nationalism, 1933–1945 (Thesis). OCLC 9355034. ProQuest 302267635.
- Landau, Jacob (June 1949). Parliamentary institutions and political parties in Egypt, 1866-1924 (Thesis). University of London.
- Tachau, Frank (1994). Political Parties of the Middle East and North Africa (1st ed.). Greenwood. pp. 130–131. ISBN 978-0313266492.
- Vatikiotis, P.J. (1978). Nasser and his Generation. Billing & Sons Ltd, Guildford, London and Worcester. ISBN 9780856644337.
