= Arab Christians =

Arabs who adhere to Christianity

الْمَسِيحِيُّون الْعَرَب
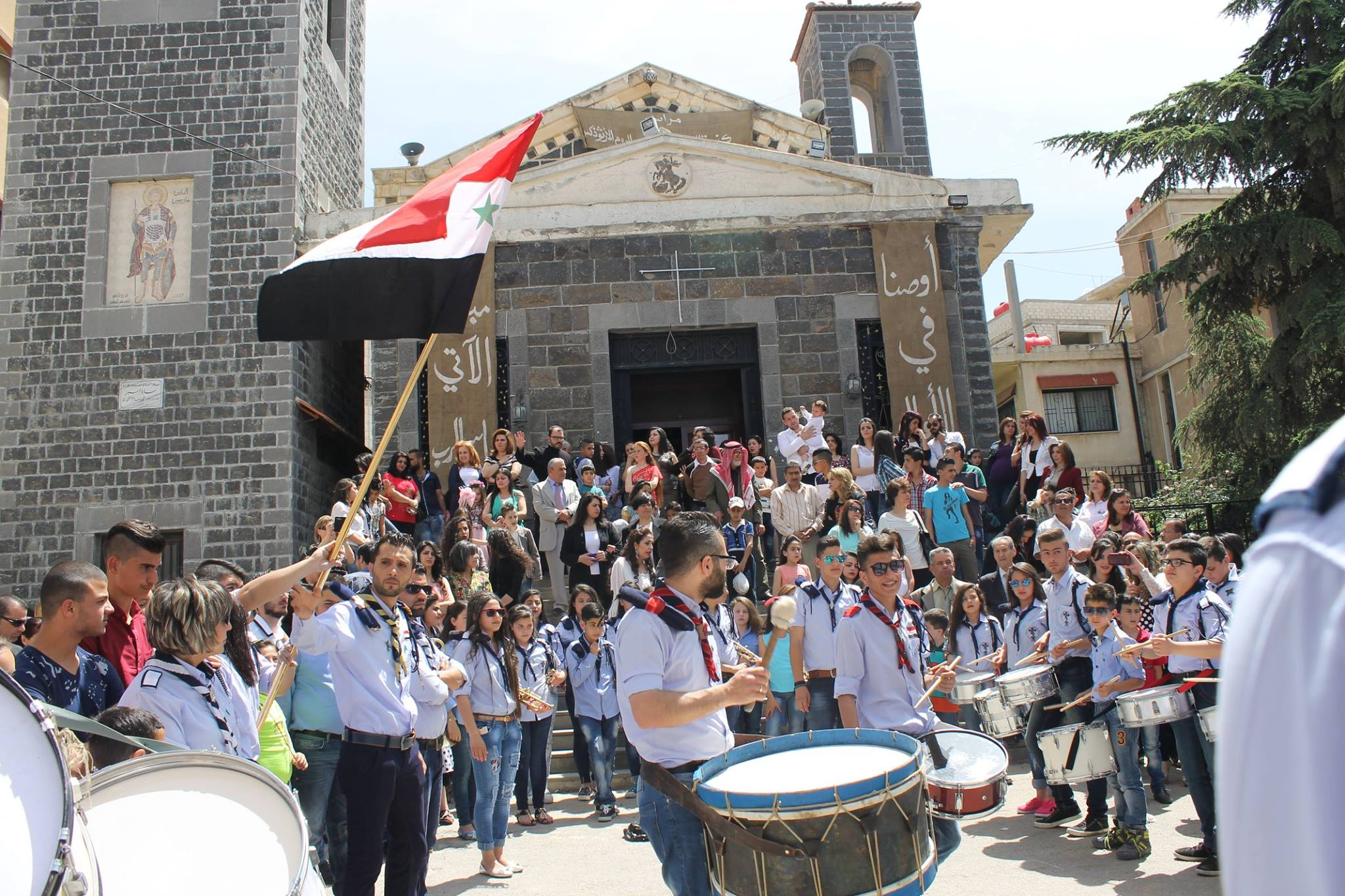
- Greek Orthodox Easter in Suwayda, Syria

Total population
- 10–15+ million

Regions with significant populations
- Lebanon: 1,150,000–1,200,000
- Jordan: 250,000–400,000
- Syria: 300,000 (Number was around 1,200,000-1,500,000 pre-Syrian civil war)
- Israel: 133,130
- Sudan: 100,000 excluding 500,000 Copts
- Iraq: 50,000 excluding 1,500,000 Assyrians
- Palestine: 50,000 excluding disputed territories
- Algeria: 45,000–380,000
- Morocco: 40,000–150,000
- Tunisia: 23,500
- Turkey: 18,000
- Egypt: 10,000–350,000 excluding 6–11 million Copts
- Libya: 1,500
- Bahrain: 1,000
- Yemen: 400
- Kuwait: 259–400

Languages
- Arabic; Liturgical: Coptic, Koine Greek, Latin, Classical Syriac, Classical Arabic

Religion
- Greek Orthodox Church: (Antioch; Jerusalem; Alexandria); Catholic Church: (Melkite Greek Catholic Church; Latin Church; Maronite Church; Syriac Catholic Church; Chaldean Catholic Church; Armenian Catholic Church; Coptic Catholic Church); Oriental Orthodox Church: (Armenian Apostolic Church; Cilician Orthodox Church; Coptic Orthodox Church; Syriac Orthodox Church); Nestorianism: (Assyrian Church of the East; Ancient Church of the East); Protestantism; Restorationism

Related ethnic groups
- Rum Arabs; Maronites; Copts; Chaldean Catholics; Assyrians; Armenians; Latin Levantines; Saint Thomas Christians

Arab Christians (Arabic: الْمَسِيحِيُّون الْعَرَب, romanized: al-Masīḥiyyūn al-ʿArab) are the Arabs who adhere to Christianity. The number of Arab Christians who live in the Middle East was estimated in 2012 to be between 10 and 15 million. Arab Christian communities can be found throughout the Arab world, but are concentrated in the Eastern Mediterranean region of Syria and Egypt, with smaller communities present throughout the Arabian Peninsula and North Africa.

The history of Arab Christians begins with the history of Christianity in pre-Islamic Arabia, which coincides with the history of Eastern Christianity and the history of the Arabic language. Arab Christian communities either result from pre-existing Christian communities adopting the Arabic language, or from pre-existing Arabic-speaking communities adopting Christianity. The jurisdictions of three of the five patriarchates of the Pentarchy primarily became Arabic-speaking after the early Muslim conquests – the Church of Alexandria, the Church of Antioch and the Church of Jerusalem – and over time many of their adherents adopted the Arabic language and culture. Separately, a number of early Arab kingdoms and tribes adopted Christianity, including the Nabataeans, Lakhmids, Salihids, Tanukhids, Ibadis of al-Hira, and the Ghassanids.

In modern times, Arab Christians have played important roles in the Nahda movement, and they have significantly influenced and contributed to the fields of literature, politics, business, philosophy, music, theatre and cinema, medicine, and science. Today Arab Christians still play important roles in the Arab world, and are relatively wealthy, well educated, and politically moderate. Emigrants from Arab Christian communities also make up a significant proportion of the Middle Eastern diaspora, with sizable population concentrations across the Americas, most notably in Brazil, Argentina, Venezuela, Colombia, and the US. However those emigrants to the Americas, especially from the first wave of emigration, have often not passed the Arabic language to their descendants, having integrated into the majority-Christian communities to which they emigrated.

The concept of an Arab Christian identity remains contentious, with some Arabic-speaking Christian groups in the Middle East, such as Assyrians, Armenians, Greeks and others, rejecting an Arab identity. Individuals from Egypt's Coptic Christian community and Lebanon's Maronite community sometimes assume a non-Arab identity.

== History ==
The history of Arab Christians coincides with the history of Christianity and the history of the Arabic language; Arab Christian communities result either from pre-existing Christian communities adopting the Arabic language, or from pre-existing Arabic-speaking communities adopting Christianity. Arab Christians include the indigenous Christian communities of Western Asia who became majority Arabic-speaking after the consequent seventh-century Muslim conquests in the Fertile Crescent. The Christian Arab presence predates the early Muslim conquests, and there were many Arab tribes that converted to Christianity, beginning in the 1st century.

The interests of the Arabs before the 9th century A.D. were focused primarily on the recording and translating of pre-Islamic poetry. The early Arab Christians recorded Syriac hymns, Arabic poetry, ecclesiastical melodies, proverbs, and ḥikam (rules of governance). They did not otherwise record religion, which gave way to conflicting accounts and sparse evidence for specific practices over several centuries.

From classical antiquity to modern times, Arab Christians have played important roles contributing to the culture of the Mashriq, in particular those in the Levant, Egypt and Iraq.

=== Pre-Islamic period ===
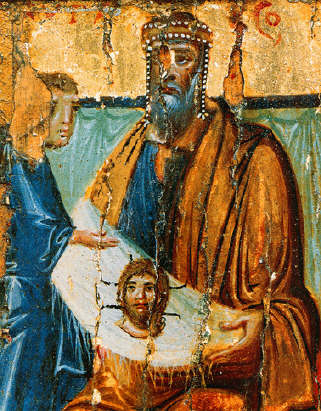
One of the first Christian kings in history, Abgar V of Osroene, belonged to the Nabataean Arab Abgarid dynasty

The New Testament has a biblical account of Arab conversion to Christianity recorded in the Book of Acts. When Saint Peter preaches to the people of Jerusalem, they ask,

And how hear we every man in our own tongue, wherein we were born?
[...] Arabians, we do hear them speak in our tongues the wonderful works of God. (Acts 2:8, 11 KJV)

The first mention of Christianity in Arabia occurs in the New Testament as the Apostle Paul references his journey to Arabia following his conversion (Galatians 1: 15–17). Later, Eusebius discusses a bishop named Beryllus in the see of Bostra, the site of a synod c. 240 AD and two Councils of Arabia. The New Testament signals an early entry of Christianity among the Arabs; in addition to what was narrated by al-Tabari, Abu al-Fida, al-Maqrizi, Ibn Khaldun and al-Masoudi, the disciples of Christ (including Matthew, Bartholomew and Thaddeus) were the ones who went to Arabia as preachers of the religion. Sozomen of Gaza said that the Arabs converted to Christianity through the efforts of priests and monks who spread to Arab regions, and the strength of Christianity increased with the conversion of the major tribes. The religion was organised in many dioceses controlled by bishops and archbishops. The Arab bishops were divided into types: urban bishops residing in cities, and “tent bishops” who resided in tents and moved with their tribes from one place to another. The number of Arab bishops among the Nabataeans alone reached forty according to Ibn Durayd. The first Arab bishop of the Arabs, Saint Moses, spent many years in the 4th century as a hermit between Syria and Egypt. His piety impressed Mawiyya, Arab warrior-queen of the Tanukhids, and she made his consecration as a bishop over her people a condition to any truce with Rome.

The Ghassanid Kingdom (220–638 AD)

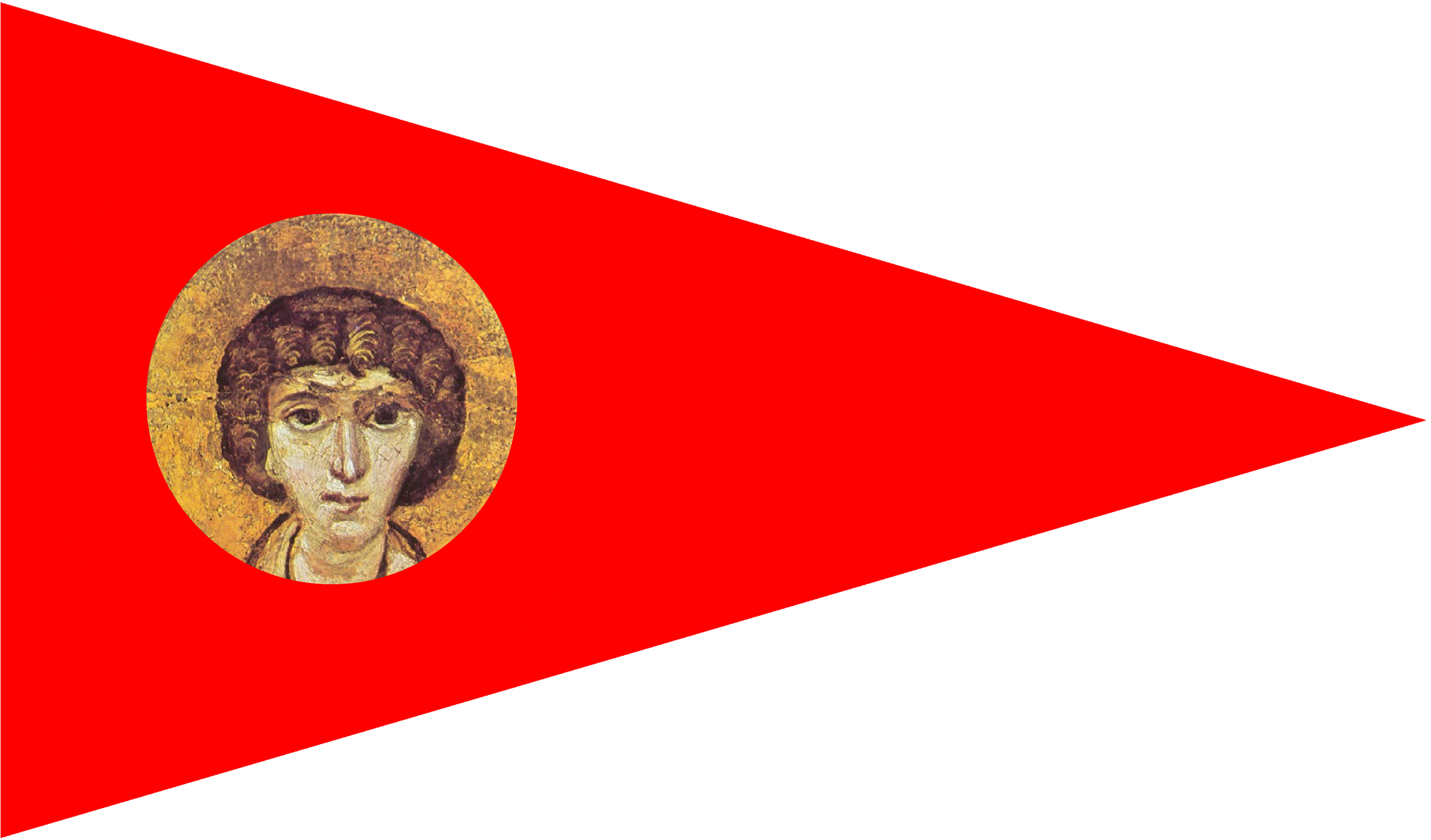
The war banner of the Ghassanids, bearing the picture of Saint Sergius

Map of the Ghassanid Kingdom under al-Mundhir III ibn al-Harith

The Jordan Valley and the Balqa was under Arab Christian rule by the second century AD. The Nabataeans, natives of the southern Levant, also converted to Christianity in the Late Roman Period. In Palmyra and near al-Qaryatayn there are Christian monuments and the remains of churches and inscriptions that indicate the spread of the religion into Syria proper. The administration of Jordan under Roman rule was given to the Quda'a tribe. This tribe had embraced Christianity according to Ya'qubi, and were later succeeded by the Christian Salihids and Ghassanid Kingdom. There are poetic verses by the pre-Islamic poet al-Nabigha in which he praises the kings of Ghassan, congratulating them on Palm Sunday. Bordering Syria, the Sinai was administratively affiliated with the Egyptian Church based in Alexandria. There are documents from the late third century of Dionysius, Pope of Alexandria, in which he mentions his Arab Christian subjects in the Sinai and the persecution they faced during the days of the pagan Roman emperor Diocletian. Later, forty martyrs fell in 309 in Mount Sinai during a raid by pagan Arabs on their hermitages. The monks fortified their new monasteries, and the most fortified is still in use today, Saint Catherine's Monastery, built by the commission of Roman emperor Justinian in 565. It has hosted a number of Church bishops and theologians, Ghassanid and Lakhmid kings, and pre-Islamic poets.

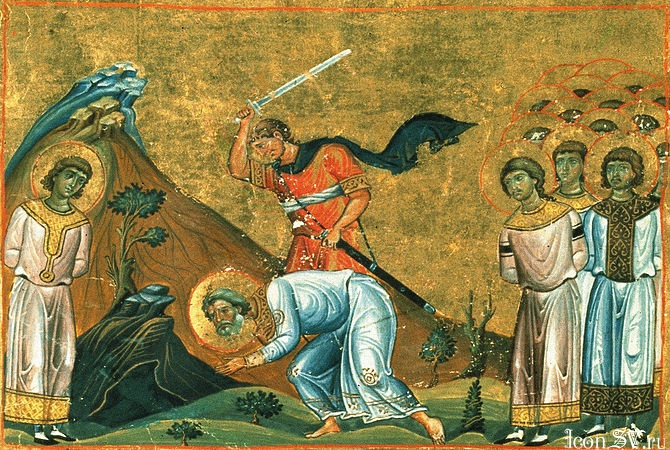
The Martyrs of Najran, Menologion of Basil II

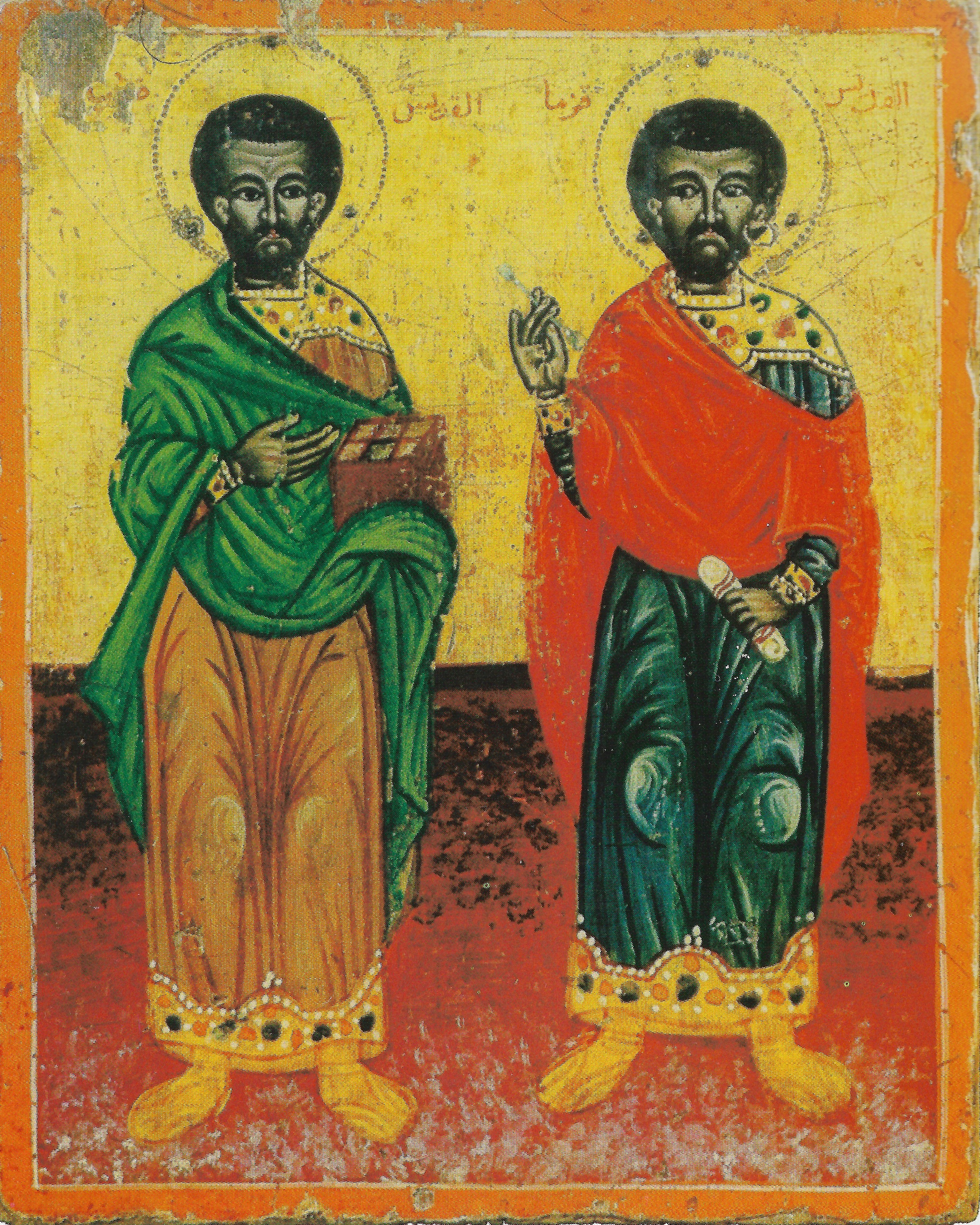
Saints Cosmas and Damian were born in Arabia c. 3rd-century AD

The southern Arabian city of Najran was made famous by the religious persecution of Christians by one of the kings of Yemen, Dhu Nuwas, who was an enthusiastic convert to Judaism. The leader of the Arabs of Najran during the period, al-Ḥārith, was canonized by the Catholic Church as Arethas. Aretas was the leader of the Christians of Najran in the early 6th century and was executed during the massacre of Christians by the king in 523. Ibn Khaldun, Ibn Hisham and Yaqut al-Hamawi mentioned that Najran was entirely Christian when Dhu al-Nawas converted to Judaism, and that the people of Najran refused to convert to his faith, so he massacred them. The victims were mentioned by Ibn Ishaq and named in the Quran as the "People of the Ditch". The Byzantine emperor Justin I was enraged and encouraged Kaleb of Axum to occupy Yemen and eliminate the Jewish king. Dhu al-Nawas was later deposed and killed, prompting Kaleb to appoint a native Christian Himyarite, Sumyafa Ashwa, as his viceroy. The Aksumites thus conquered Himyar and their rule lasted until 575. The Abyssinians spread Christianity and their rulers built an extravagant building in honor of the Martyrs of Najran. It was known by its contemporaries for its beauty, adorned with ornaments, jewels, and prominent archways. Arabs called it the “Kaaba of Najran”. The Yemenis later rebelled against the Abyssinians and demanded independence. History records Christian influence from Ethiopia to Arab lands in pre-Islamic times, and some Ethiopian Christians may have lived in Mecca.

Yemen had an important share in ancient Christianity. In the second century, the Greek theologian Pantaenus left Alexandria and headed towards Yemen as a missionary after his conversion. Historians such as Rufinus and Orosius mentioned that Matthew the Apostle was the missionary of Yemen and Abyssinia. A special relationship developed between the people of Yemen and the Syrian Church, as inferred by the works of Ephrem the Syrian, the biography of Simeon Stylites, and the historian Philostorgius, who said that some villages and settlements established in Yemen were Syriac-speaking. The famous Al-Qalis Church in Sana'a was built to serve aderents and to attract pilgrims travelling to the Kaaba of Mecca and Ghamdan Palace. On the organizational level, the Archbishop of Yemen held the title "Catholicos" which follows the "Patriarch" in rank. The spread of Christianity amongst Arabs reached Upper Mesopotamia, where Banu Bakr and Banu Mudar lived, both famous for their staunch Christian beliefs and for honoring Sergius the Military Saint. Ibn Khallikan mentioned that all the Yemeni Arabs in Iraq converted to Christianity, including Taym al-Lat, Kalb, Lakhm and Tanukh, and many had moved towards Bahrain by the fourth century.

In Medina there was a Christian sect that was rejected by the official church and considered heretical. They deified the Virgin Mary and gave her offerings. This sect was mentioned by a number of historians, including Epiphanius and Ibn Taymiyya, who called them "The Marians" (Al-Maryamiyyun). Likewise, al-Zamakhshari and al-Baydawi referred to this sect in their interpretation of the Qur’an. Another sect called "The Davidians" (Al-Dāwudiyyūn) were known for their exaggerations in honoring King David. Some contemporary historians classified it as a Judeo-Christian heresy. In Mecca, the Banu Jurhum embraced Christianity at the hands of their sixth king, Abd al-Masih ibn Baqia, and supervised the service of the Haram for a period of time. Banu Azd and Banu Khuza’a became Christians with them according to Abu al-Faraj al-Isfahani. The earliest indications of Christianity in Mecca is the Christian cemetery outside the Medina towards the well of 'Anbasa, confirmed by al-Maqdisi, as well as the conversion to Christianity by some members of the Quraysh.

=== Islamic era ===
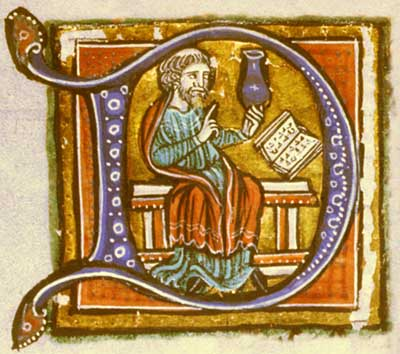
Hunayn ibn Ishaq (809–873 AD) was an influential Nestorian translator, scholar, physician and scientist of the Islamic Golden Age

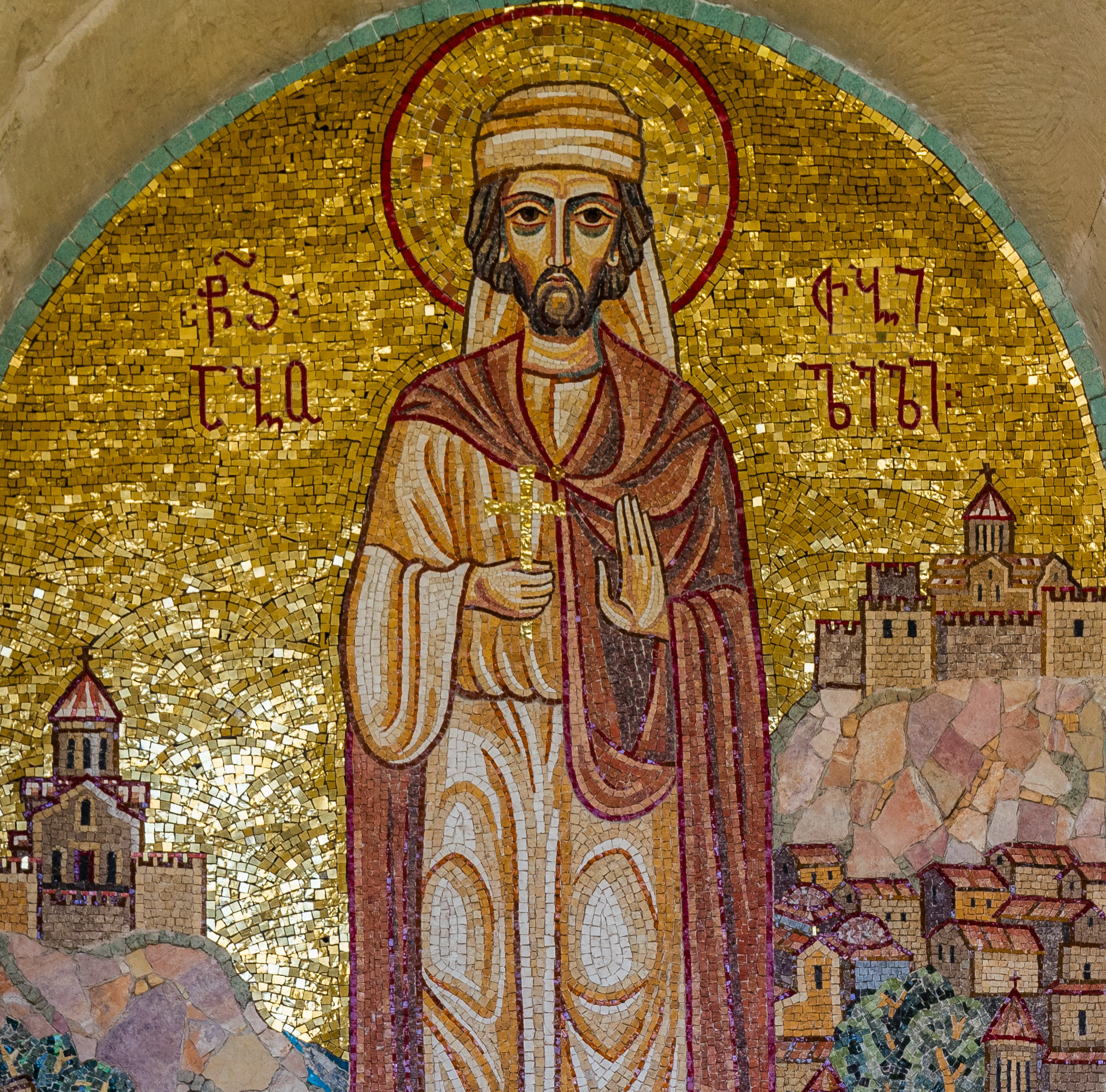
Saint Abo of Tiflis (756–786 AD), martyred for his faith in Georgia

Following the fall of large portions of former Byzantine and Sasanian provinces to the Arab armies, a large indigenous Christian population of varying ethnicities came under Arab Muslim dominance. Historically, a number of minority Christian sects were persecuted as heretic under Byzantine rule (such as non-Chalcedonians). The Islamic conquests set forth two processes affecting these Christian communities: the process of Arabization, causing them gradually to adopt Arabic as a spoken, literary, and liturgical language (often alongside their ancestral tongues), and the much slower, yet persistent process of Islamization. As Muslim army commanders expanded their empire and attacked countries in Asia, North Africa and southern Europe, they would offer three conditions to their enemies: convert to Islam, pay jizya (tax) every year, or face war to death. Those who refused war and refused to convert were deemed to have agreed to pay jizya.

As "People of the Book", Islamic law accorded Christians the right to practice their religion (including having Christian law used for rulings, settlements or sentences in court). In contrast to Muslims, who paid the zakat, they paid the jizya capitation tax. The jizya was not levied on slaves, women, children, monks, the old, the sick, hermits, or the very poor. In return, non-Muslim citizens were permitted to practice their faith, to enjoy a measure of communal autonomy, to be entitled to Muslim state's protection from outside aggression, to be exempted from military service, and to be exempted from the zakat. Like Arab Muslims, Arab Christians refer to God as "Allah". As with the Christians of Malta, this practice is distinguished from the Islamic use of the word "Allah" which refers to the personal name of God in that faith. The use of the term Allah in Arab churches predates Islam.

During the Islamic Golden Age, Christians contributed to the Islamic civilization in various fields, and the institution known as the House of Wisdom employed Christian scholars to translate works into Arabic and to develop new knowledge.

=== Modern and contemporary era ===
Arab Christians have always been the go-between the Islamic world and the Christian West due to their shared religious affinity. The Greek Orthodox share Orthodox ties with Russia and Greece; whilst Melkites and Maronites share Catholic bonds with Italy, Vatican and France. Scholars and intellectuals agree Christians in the Arab world have made significant contributions to Arab civilization since the introduction of Islam, and they have had a notable impact contributing the culture of the Mashriq. Many Arab Christians today are physicians, entertainers, philosophers, government officials and people of literature.

==== Role in the Nahda ====
The Nahda (meaning "the Awakening" or "the Renaissance") was a cultural renaissance of the Arabs in the late 19th and early 20th centuries. It began in the wake of the exit of Muhammad Ali of Egypt from the Levant in 1840. Beirut, Cairo, Damascus and Aleppo were the main centers of the renaissance and this led to the establishment of schools, universities, theater and printing presses. This awakening led to the emergence of a politically active movement known as the "association" that was accompanied by the birth of Arab nationalism and the demand for reformation in the Ottoman Empire. This led to the calling of the establishment of modern states based on Europe. It was during this stage that the first compound of the Arabic language was introduced along with the printing of it in letters, and later the movement influenced the fields of music, sculpture, history, humanities, economics and human rights.

This cultural renaissance during the late Ottoman rule was a quantum leap for Arabs in the post-industrial revolution, and is not limited to the individual fields of cultural renaissance in the nineteenth century, as the Nahda only extended to include the spectrum of society and the fields as a whole. Christian colleges (accepting of all faiths) like Saint Joseph University, American University of Beirut (Syrian Protestant College until 1920) and Al-Hikma University in Baghdad amongst others played a prominent role in the development of Arab culture. It is agreed amongst historians the importance the roles played by the Arab Christians in this renaissance, and their role in the prosperity through participation in the diaspora. Given this role in politics and culture, Ottoman ministers began to include them in their governments. In the economic sphere, a number of Christian families like the Greek Orthodox Sursock family became prominent. Thus, the Nahda led the Muslims and Christians to a cultural renaissance and national general despotism. This solidified Arab Christians as one of the pillars of the region and not a minority on the fringes.

The Lebanese writer and scholar Butrus al-Bustani is considered to have been the first Syrian nationalist. Syrian writers include scholar Francis Marrash. The tradition of women's literary salons and societies in the Arab world was revived during the Nahda by Maryana Marrash.

Notable academics in the modern era include the Syrian philologist Ibrahim al-Yaziji (1847–1906), whose Bible translations were among the first in the modern Arabic language, and Anastase-Marie al-Karmali (1866–1947), Iraqi Catholic priest and Discalced Carmelite friar best known for his contributions to Arabic lexicology, lexicography and philology.

Notable Arab Christians of the Nahda

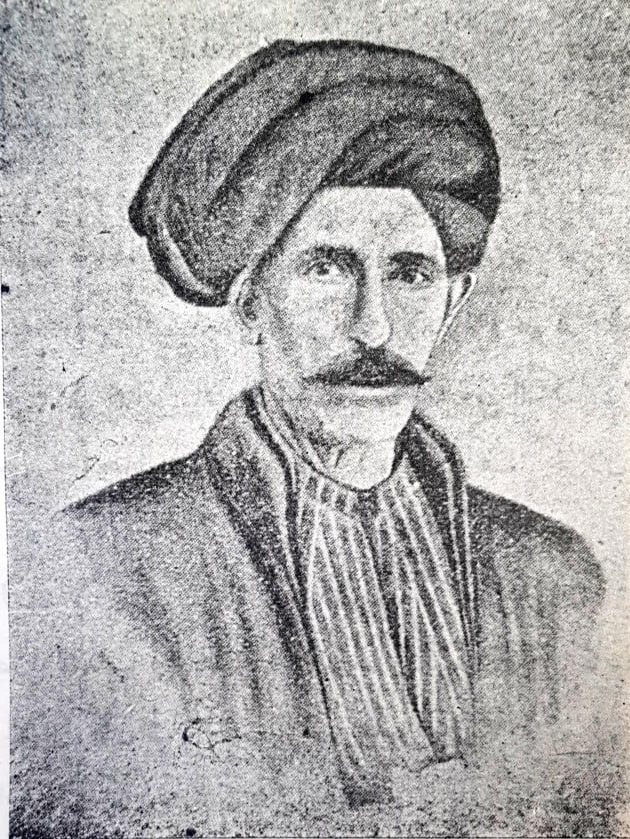
Nasif al-Yaziji
(1800–1871),
Lebanese author, poet and key figure of the Nahda

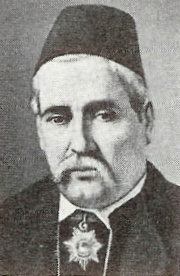
Butrus al-Bustani
(1819–1883),
Lebanese writer scholar, lexicographer, periodical editor, translator

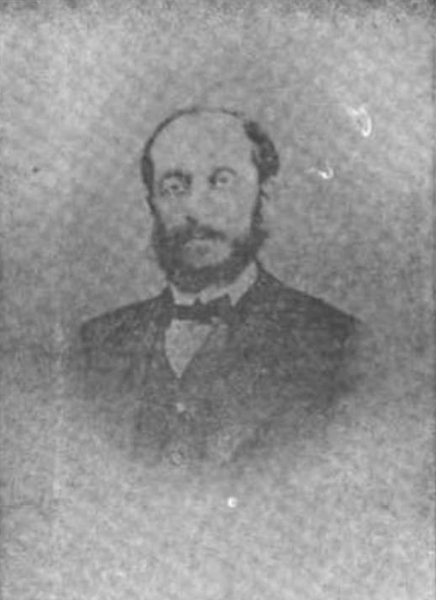
Francis Marrash
(June 1836 – 1874),
Syrian scholar, publicist, writer and poet

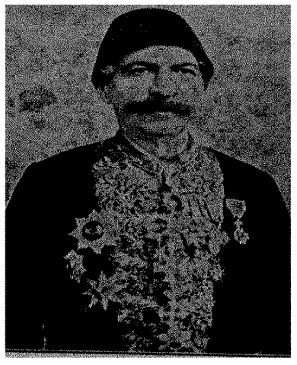
Khalil al-Khuri
(Oct 1836 – 1907),
Lebanese newspaper owner and writer

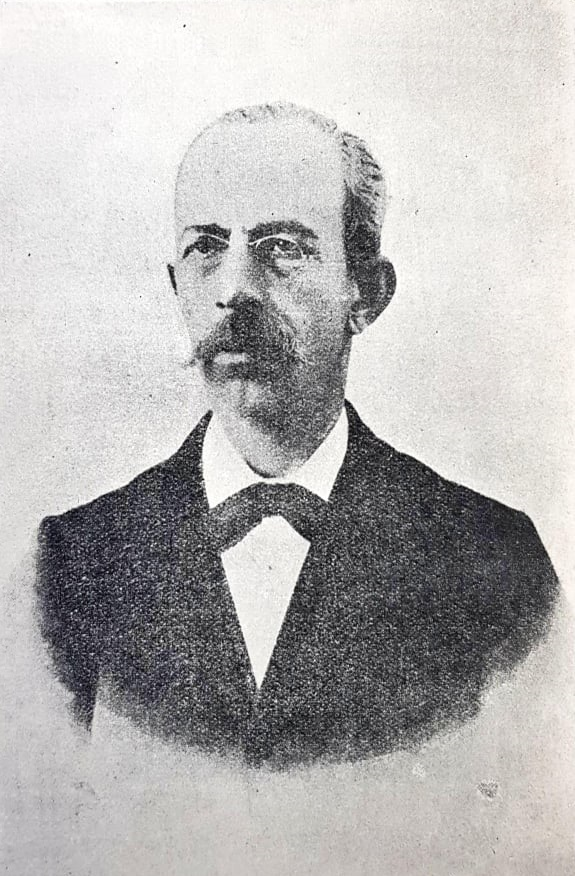
Ibrahim al-Yaziji
(1847–1906),
Lebanese intellectual

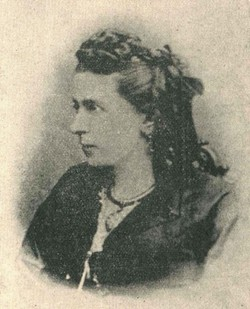
Maryana Marrash
(1848–1919),
Syrian writer and poet, the reviver of women's literary salons and the first Syrian woman to publish a collection of poetry

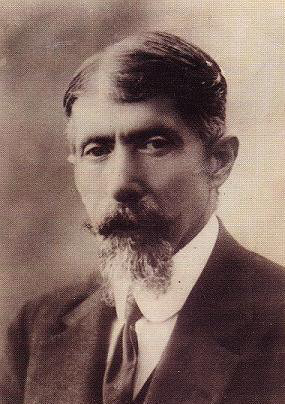
Qustaki al-Himsi
(1858–1941),
Syrian intellectual who was the founder of modern Arabic literary criticism

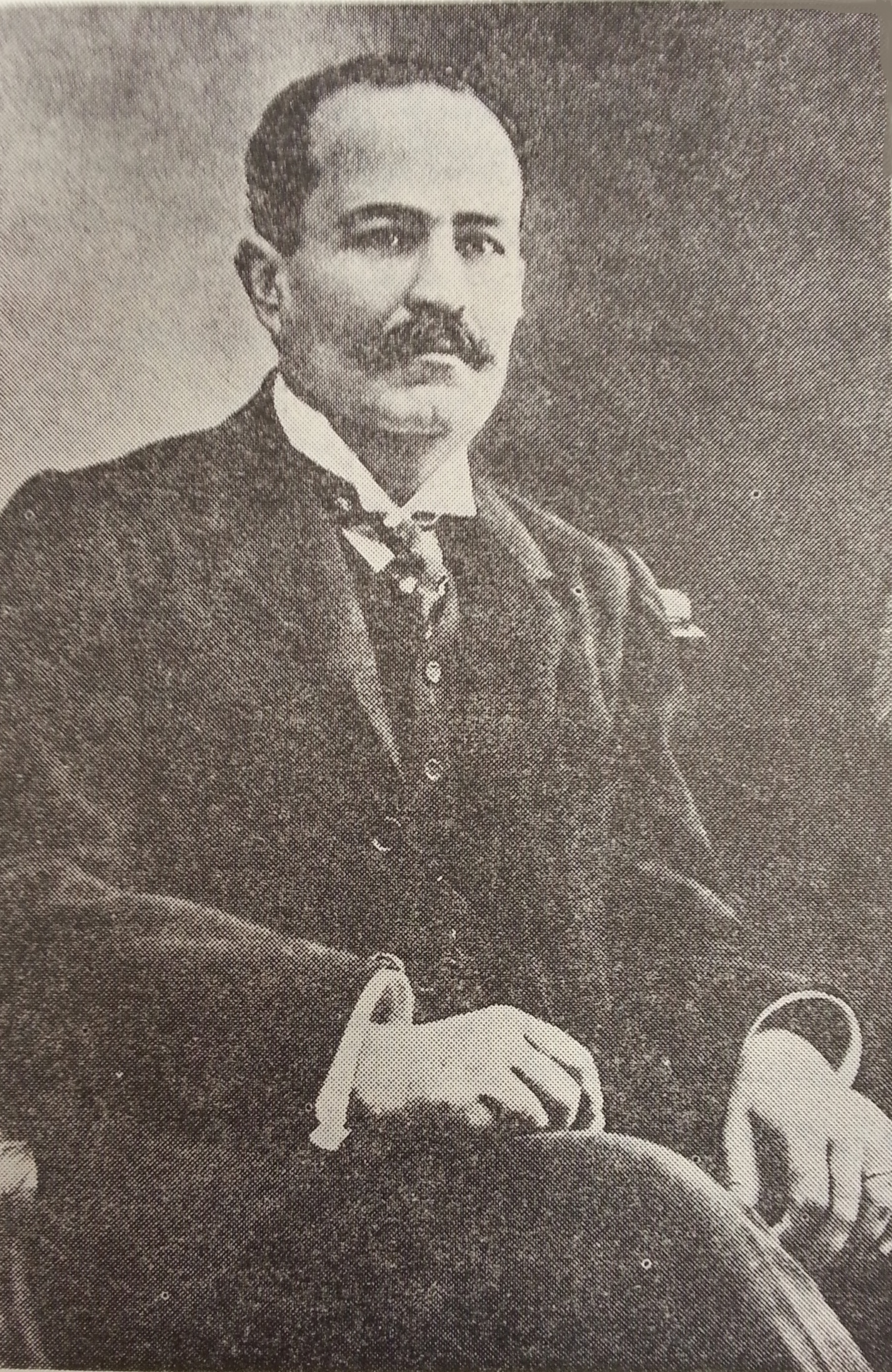
Jurji Zaydan
(1861–1914),
Lebanese novelist and journalist

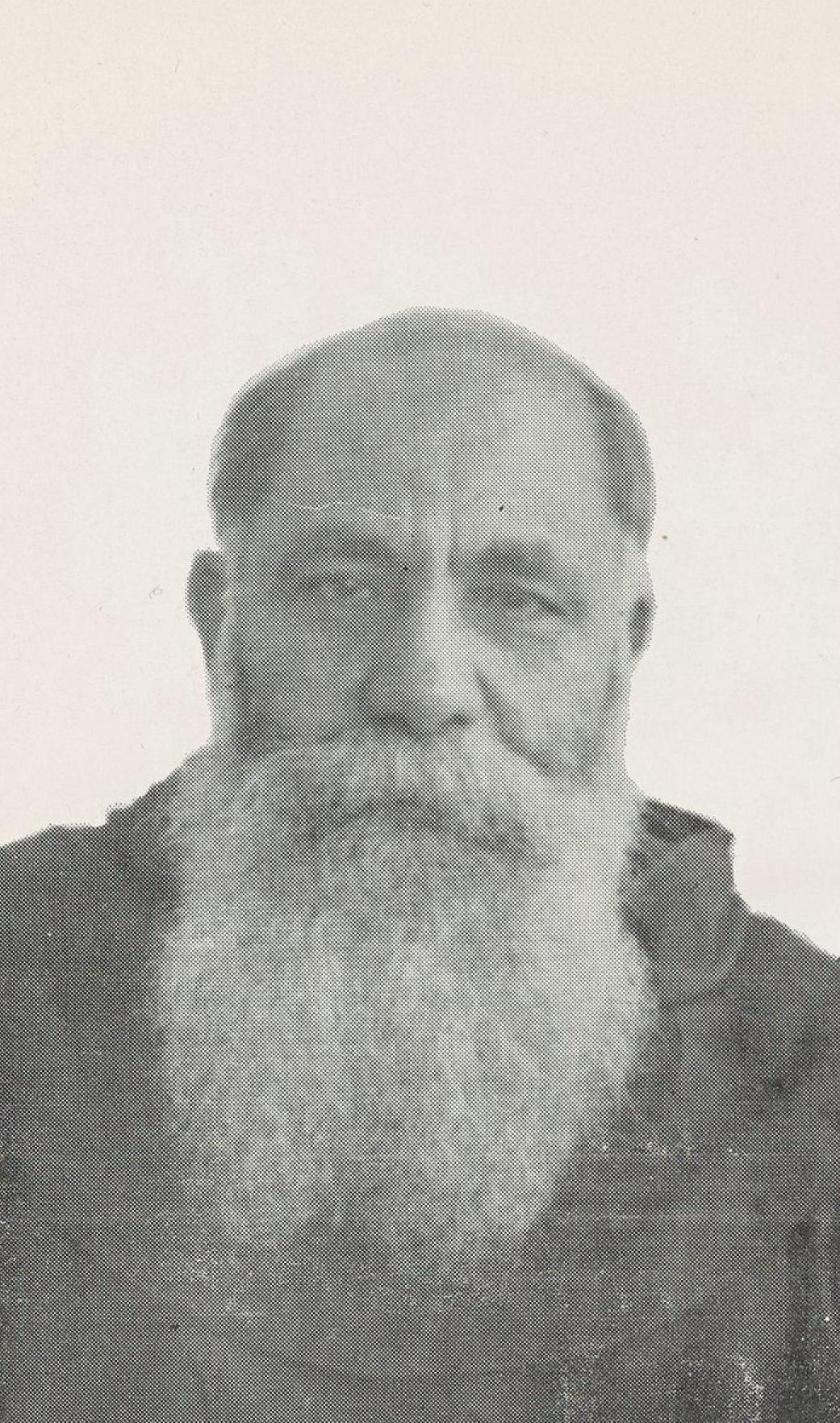
Anastase-Marie al-Karmali
(1866–1947),
Iraqi Catholic priest and Discalced Carmelite friar, lexicologist, lexicographer and philologist of the Arabic language

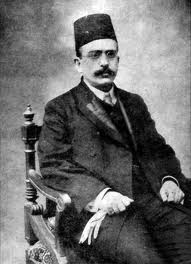
Abd al-Masih al-Antaki
(1874–1923),
Syrian intellectual, journalist and political activist

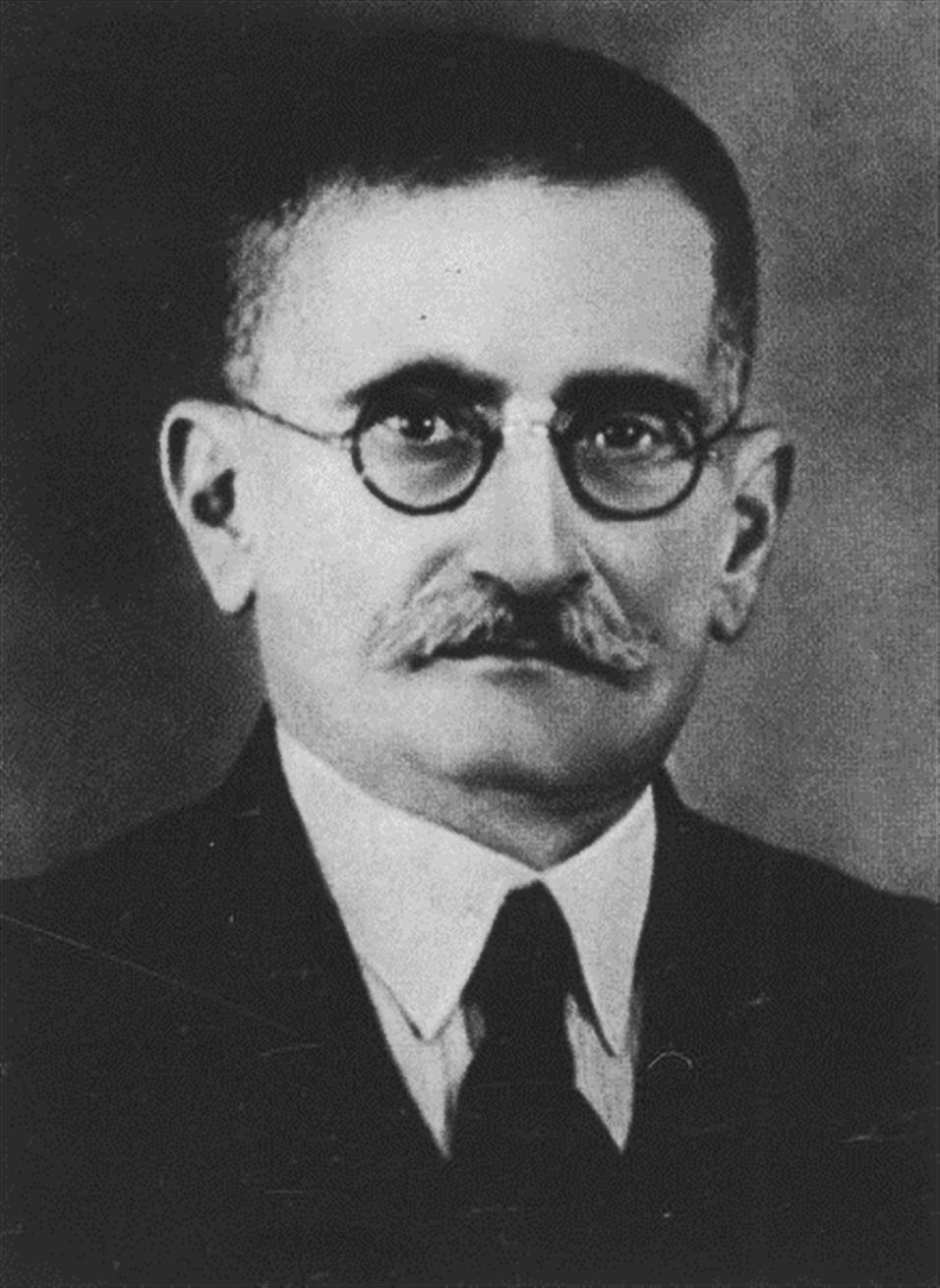
Khalil Beidas
(1874–1949),
Palestinian scholar, translator, educator and novelist

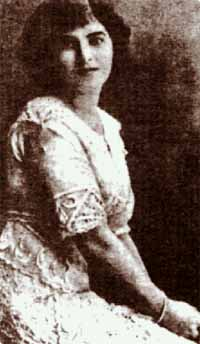
May Ziadeh
(1886–1941),
Lebanese-Palestinian poet and pioneer of Oriental feminism

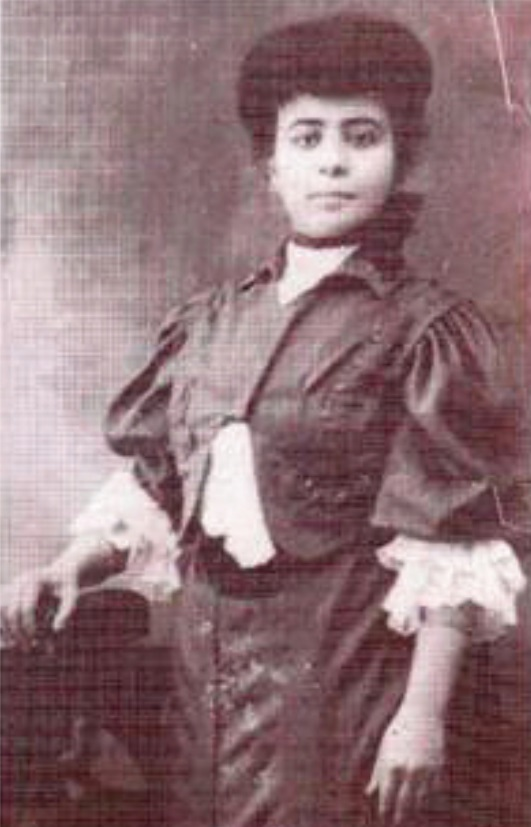
Mary Ajami
(1888–1965),
Syrian writer who launched the first women's newspaper in the Arab world

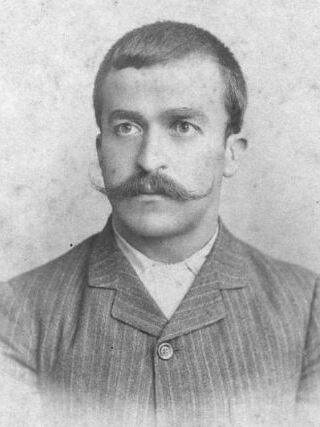
Khalil Sakakini (1878 – 1953), Palestinian teacher, scholar and poet

==== Religious persecution ====
The Massacre of Aleppo of 1850, often referred to simply as The Events, was a riot perpetrated by Muslim residents of Aleppo, largely from the eastern quarters of the city, against Christian residents, largely located in the northern suburbs of the predominantly Christian neighbourhood Judayde (Jdeideh) and Salibeh. The Events are considered by historians to be particularly important in Aleppian history, for they represent the first time disturbances pitted Muslims against Christians in the region. The patriarch of the Syriac Catholic Church, Peter VII Jarweh, was fatally wounded in the attacks and died a year later. 20–70 people died from rioting and 5,000 died as a result of bombardment.

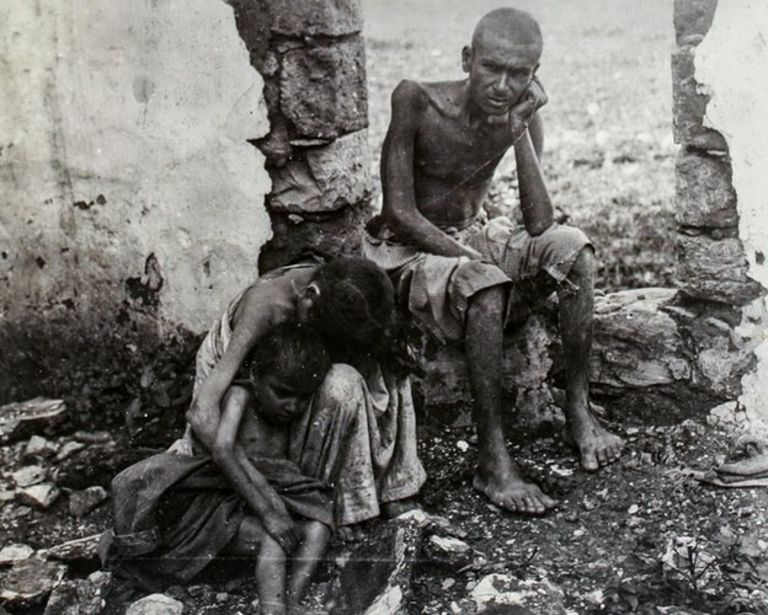
Starving man and children in Mount Lebanon during the Great Famine, 1915–18

The 1860 civil conflict in Mount Lebanon and Damascus was a civil conflict and later massacre during Ottoman rule, started by skirmishes occurring between the Maronites and the Druze of Mount Lebanon. Following decisive victories and massacres against Christians, the conflict spilled over into other parts of Ottoman Syria, particularly the city Damascus, where over ten thousand Christian residents of various denominations were killed by Druze and Muslim militiamen. With the connivance of the military authorities and Turkish soldiers, Druze and allied paramilitary groups organised pogroms in Damascus which lasted three days (9–11 July). By the war's end, around 20,000 Christians had been killed, and many villages and churches were destroyed. The Christian quarter of old Damascus was destroyed and houses were plundered. Historian Mikhail Mishaqa's memoir of the massacre is valuable to historians, as it is the only account written by a survivor of a mob attack. Emir Abdelkader al-Jazairi, the exiled Algerian Muslim military leader, ordered his sons and soldiers to protect and shelter Damascene Christians from impending interpersonal violence that was spreading throughout the city, thereby saving thousands, preserving this ancient community from complete devastation.

Melkite Greek Catholic and Maronite Christians suffered negligence from the Ottoman authorities and an Allied blockade of the Eastern Mediterranean, resulting in the Great Famine of Mount Lebanon (1915–1918) during World War I, which ran in conjunction with the Armenian genocide, the Assyrian genocide and the Greek genocide. The Mount Lebanon famine caused the highest fatality rate by population during World War I. Around 200,000 people starved to death when the population of Mount Lebanon was estimated to be 400,000 people. The Lebanese diaspora in Egypt funded the shipping of food supplies to Mount Lebanon, sent via the Syrian Island town of Arwad. On 26 May 1916, Lebanese-American writer Kahlil Gibran wrote a letter to Mary Haskell that read:

The famine in Mount Lebanon has been planned and instigated by the Turkish government. Already 80,000 have succumbed to starvation and thousands are dying every single day. The same process happened with the Christian Armenians and applied to the Christians in Mount Lebanon.

==== Politics (20th century – present) ====
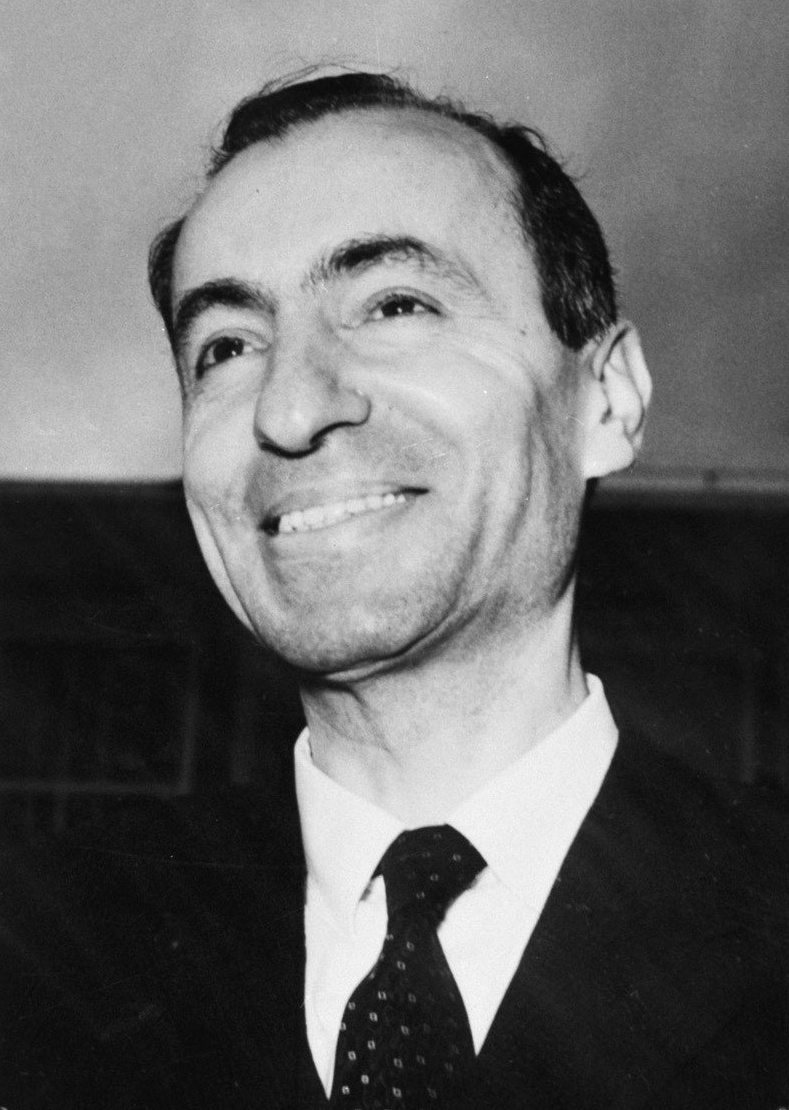
Michel Aflaq, Syrian philosopher, sociologist and co-founder of Ba'athism

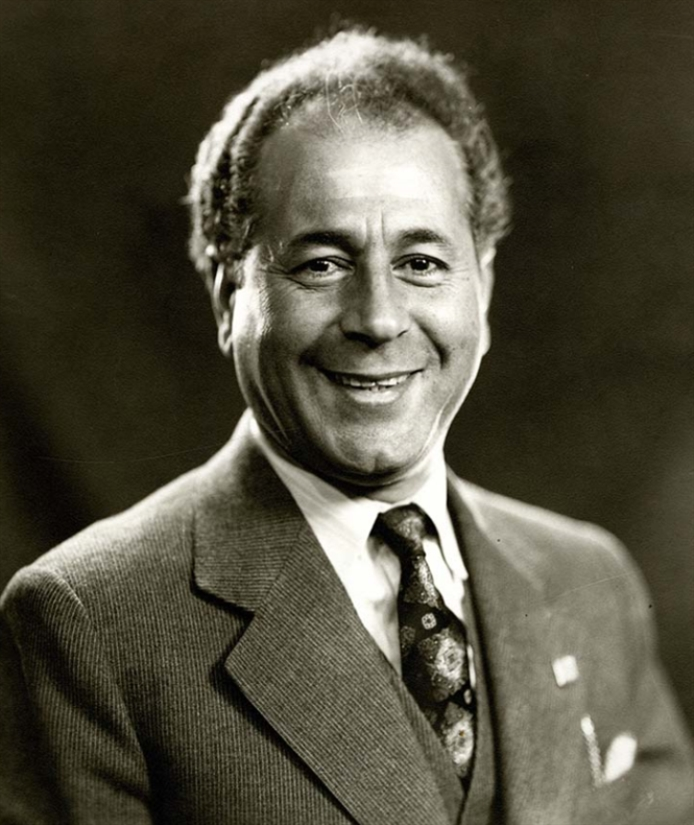
Antoun Saadeh was a Lebanese philosopher, politician and founder of the SSNP– the second biggest political party in Syria today

Arab Christians had been among the first Arab nationalists. As early as 1877, the Maronite leader Youssef Bey Karam had proposed to Emir Abdelkader the separation of the Arabic-speaking provinces from the Ottoman Empire using the terms al-gins al-'arabi ("Arab race") and gaba'il al-arabiya ("Arab tribes"). In the early 20th century, many prominent Arab nationalists were Christians, like the Syrian intellectual Constantin Zureiq, Ba'athism proponent Michel Aflaq, and Jurji Zaydan, who was reputed to be the first Arab nationalist. Khalil al-Sakakini, a prominent Palestinian Jerusalemite, was Arab Orthodox, as was George Antonius, Lebanese author of The Arab Awakening. Grégoire Haddad, known as the "Red Bishop of Beirut", founded the "Lebanese Social Movement" with Shiite Imam Musa al-Sadr in 1960, and promoted in the following years Islamic-Christian dialogue. The first Syrian nationalists were also Christian. Although Lebanese, Antoun Saadeh was the founder behind the Syrian Social Nationalist Party. Sa'adeh rejected Pan-Arabism and argued instead for the creation of a "United Syrian Nation" or "Natural Syria". George Habash, founder of the Popular Front for the Liberation of Palestine was Arab Orthodox, and so was Wadie Haddad, the leader of the PFLP's armed wing. Influential Palestinian Christians such as Tawfik Toubi, Daud Turki, Emile Touma and Emile Habibi became leaders of the Israeli and Palestinian communist party. Nayif Hawatmeh is the founder and leader of the Democratic Front for the Liberation of Palestine, and Kamal Nasser and Hanan Ashrawi were members of the PLO Executive Committee.

==== Regional conflicts ====
During the 1948 Arab–Israeli War, a number of Palestinian Greek Orthodox and Melkite communities were ethnically cleansed and driven out of their towns, including al-Bassa, Ramla, Lod, Safed, Kafr Bir'im, Iqrit, Tarbikha, Eilabun and Haifa. Many Christian towns or neighborhoods were ethnically cleansed and destroyed during the period between 1948 and 1953. All the Christian residents of Safed, Beisan, Tiberias were removed, and a big percentage displaced in Haifa, Jaffa, Lydda and Ramleh. Arab Christian Constantin Zureiq was the first to coin the term "Nakba" in reference to the 1948 Palestinian exodus.

In 1975, the Lebanese Civil War occurred between two broad camps, the mainly Christian 'rightist' Lebanese Front consisting of Maronites and Melkites, and the mainly Muslim and Arab nationalist 'leftist' National Movement, supported by the Druze, Greek Orthodox and the Palestinian community. The war was characterized by the kidnap, rape and massacre of those caught in the wrong place as each side eliminated 'enemy' enclaves – mainly Christian or Muslim low-income areas. In Lebanon, Maronites and Melkites looked to France and the Mediterranean world, whereas most Muslims and Greek Orthodox Christians looked to the Arab hinterland as their political lodestar. In 1982 Israel invaded Lebanon with the aim of destroying the PLO, which it besieged in West Beirut. Israel was later obliged to withdraw as a result of multiple guerrilla attacks by the Lebanese National Resistance Front and increasing hostility across all forces in Lebanon to their presence.

With the events of the Arab Spring, the Syrian Arab Christian community was heavily hit in line with other Christian communities of Syria, being victimized by the war and specifically targeted as a minority by Jihadist forces. Many Christians, including Arab Christians, were displaced or fled Syria over the course of the Syrian Civil War. When the conflict in Syria began, it was reported that Christians were cautious and avoided taking sides, but that due to the increased violence and ISIL's growth, Arab Christians showed support for Assad, fearing that if Assad was overthrown, they would be targeted. Christians supported the Assad regime based on the fear that the end of the current government could lead to instability. The Carnegie Middle East Center stated that the majority of Christians were more in support of the regime because they feared a chaotic situation or to be under the control of the Islamist Western and Turkish backed armed groups.

==== Academia ====
Arab Christians throughout history have been noted for their impact on academia and literature. Arabic-speaking Christian scholars wrote extensive theological and philosophical works and treatises in Arabic in which they not only responded to the polemics of their Muslim adversaries, but also provided systematic apologetic discussions of the Christian faith and practice. There are many New Testament translations or portions into regional colloquial forms of Arabic. In the 20th century, the noted Palestinian physician and ethnographer Tawfiq Canaan's academic work serves as valuable resources to researchers of Palestinian history. Jordanian historian Suleiman Mousa was the only author to write about Lawrence of Arabia and show the Arab perspective. Mousa noted that there were many books written to praise Lawrence, and all of them exaggerated his part in the Arab Revolt and failed to do justice to the Arabs themselves. Syrian writer Hanna Mina has been described in Literature from the "Axis of Evil" as the country's most prominent.

==== Media ====
Christians developed Arabic-speaking Christian media, including various newspapers, radio stations, and television networks such as Télé Lumière, Aghapy TV, CTV, and SAT-7, which is a Christian broadcasting network that was founded in 1995; it targets primarily Arab Christians in North Africa and the Middle East. These media networks produce dozens of Arabic-language Christian films, musical works, as well as radio and television programs.

Syro-Lebanese Melkite Saleem Takla and his brother Beshara founded the Al-Ahram newspaper in 1875 in Alexandria; now the most widely circulated Egyptian daily newspaper. Similarly, Lebanese Protestant Faris Nimr co-founded Al Muqattam in 1888, a leading Cairo-based newspaper in circulation until 1954. In Palestine, Najib Nassar's newspaper Al-Karmil was the first anti-Zionist weekly newspaper. It appeared in Haifa in 1908 and was shut down by the British in the 1940s. Likewise, the Arab Orthodox El-Issa family from Jaffa founded the Falastin newspaper in 1911. The paper was Palestine's most consistent critic of the early Zionist movement. In Lebanon, the influential Greek Orthodox Tueni family founded the An-Nahar newspaper in 1933, also one of the leading newspapers today. Shireen Abu Akleh worked as a reporter for the Arabic-language channel Al Jazeera for 25 years.

Popular Lebanese singer Fairuz has over 150 million records sold worldwide, making her the highest selling Middle-Eastern artist of all time. Other Lebanese singers include Majida El Roumi, legendary folk veteran Wadih El Safi, and "Queen of Arab pop" Nancy Ajram. Syrian notables include George Wassouf and Nassif Zeytoun. Palestinians include Lina Makhul, Fadee Andrawos, and Israeli singer Mira Awad.

=== Arab Christian diaspora ===
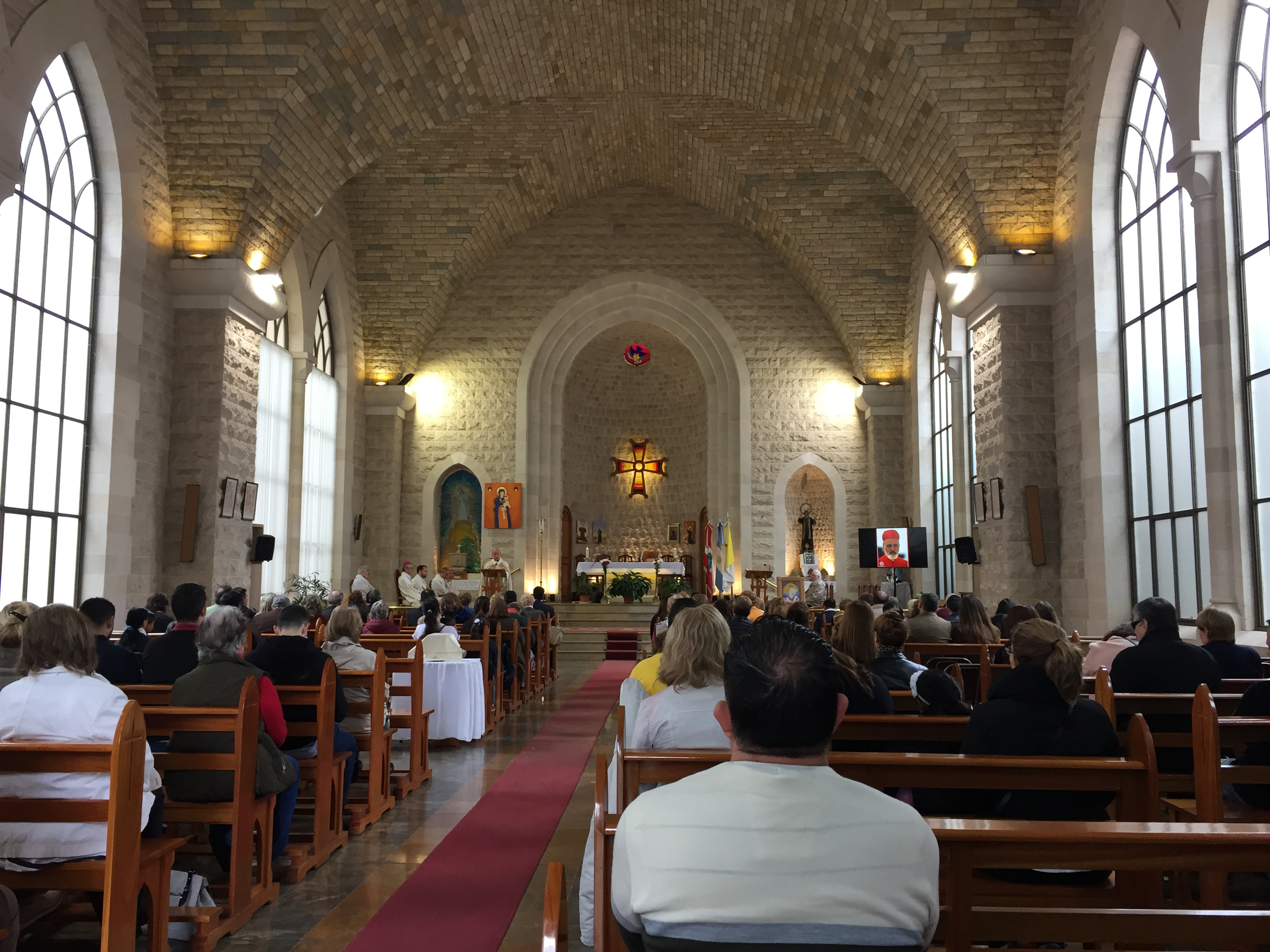
The St. Maron's Cathedral in Buenos Aires, of Maronite origin.

Millions of people are descended from Arab Christians and live outside the Middle East, in the Arab diaspora. They mainly reside in the Americas, but many people of Arab Christian descent also reside in Europe, Africa and Oceania. Among them, one million Palestinian Christians live in the Palestinian diaspora and 6–7 million Brazilians are estimated to have Lebanese ancestry. Mass Arab immigration started in the 1890s as Lebanese and Syrian people fled from the political and economic instability which was caused by the collapse of the Ottoman Empire. These early immigrants were known as Syro-Lebanese, Lebanese and Palestinians, or Turks. According to the United States census, there were at least 3.5 million Arabs living in the United States in the year 2000, with around 40% of them originating from Lebanon. The majority of them are members of the Christian faith, making up 63% of the overall Arab American population.

Historical events that caused the mass-emigration of Arab Christians include: the 1860 civil conflict in Mount Lebanon and Damascus, the 1915–1918 Great Famine of Mount Lebanon, the 1948 Palestinian expulsion and flight, the 1956–57 exodus and expulsions from Egypt, the Lebanese civil war, and the Iraq war.

==== Role in the Mahjar ====
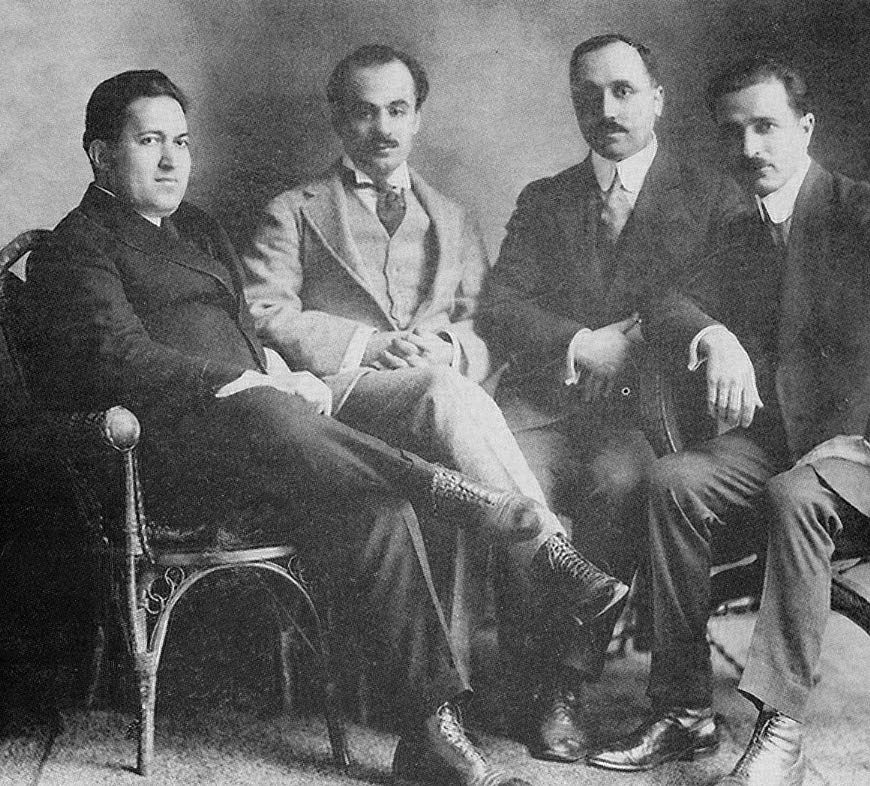
A 1920 photograph of four prominent members of The Pen League (from left to right): Nasib Arida, Kahlil Gibran, Abd al-Masih Haddad, and Mikhail Naimy

The Mahjar (one of its more literal meanings being "the Arab diaspora") was a literary movement that succeeded the Nahda movement. It was started by Christian Arabic-speaking writers who had emigrated to America from Lebanon, Syria and Palestine at the turn of the 20th century. The writers of the Mahjar movement were stimulated by their personal encounter with the Western world and participated in the renewal of Arabic literature, hence their proponents referred to as writers of the "late Nahda".

The Pen League was the first Arabic-language literary society in North America, formed initially by Syrians Nasib Arida and Abd al-Masih Haddad. Members of the Pen League included: Kahlil Gibran, Elia Abu Madi, Mikhail Naimy, and Ameen Rihani. Eight out of the ten members were Greek Orthodox and two were Maronite Christians. The league dissolved following Gibran's death in 1931 and Mikhail Naimy's return to Lebanon in 1932. Naimy was made famous internationally for his spiritual writings, most notably The Book of Mirdad.

==== Notable Arab Christians ====
Notable diaspora figures include Swiss businessman of Lebanese Greek Orthodox descent Nicolas Hayek, and Mexican business magnate of Maronite descent, Carlos Slim. From 2010 to 2013, Slim was ranked as the richest person in the world by the Forbes magazine. Figures in entertainment include actors Omar Sharif (Melkite-born), Jamie Farr, Salma Hayek, Tony Shalhoub, Vince Vaughn, Danny Thomas, Oscar award winner F. Murray Abraham and film director Youssef Chahine. Figures in academics include plant biologist Joanne Chory, scholar Nassim Nicholas Taleb, cardiac and vascular surgeon Michael DeBakey, inventor of the iPod and co-inventor of the iPhone Tony Fadell, mathematician Michael Atiyah, professor Charles Elachi, intellectual Edward Said, and Nobel Prize winner in Chemistry Elias James Corey and Nobel Prize winner in Physiology or Medicine Peter Medawar. Other notables include White House reporter Helen Thomas, activist and presidential candidate Ralph Nader, judge Rosemary Barkett, and US governor and academic administrator Mitch Daniels.

== Identity ==
=== Denominations ===
Arab Christians mainly belong to the Greek Orthodox Church of Jerusalem, Greek Orthodox Church of Antioch, Melkite Greek Catholic Church, Maronite Church, and Oriental Orthodox Churches, though some are also members of other churches, including the Catholic Latin Church and Protestant Churches, such as the Lutheran, Anglican, and Reformed traditions. Some memberships are mixed, not by co-identification, but by including two or more members of multiple ethnicities (Arab and otherwise).

List of churches based in the Arab world, including self-identification of adherents
| Denomination | Communion | Members | Membership primarily subscribes to Arab identity? | Alternative identities claimed | Headquarters | Liturgical language | Area |
|---|---|---|---|---|---|---|---|
| Coptic Orthodox Church | Oriental Orthodox | 10 million | Mixed | Coptic, including Pharaonism | Ancient: Alexandria Modern: Saint Mark's Coptic Orthodox Cathedral, Cairo, Egypt | Coptic, Arabic | Egypt |
| Maronite Catholic Church | Catholic | 3.5 million | Mixed | Maronite, Phoenician and Aramean | Ancient: Antioch Modern: Bkerké, Lebanon | Arabic, Syriac | Lebanon (approximately one third), Syria, Israel, Cyprus, Jordan |
| Greek Orthodox Church of Antioch | Eastern Orthodox | 2.5 million | Yes | Greek and Byzantine | Ancient: Antioch Modern: Mariamite Cathedral, Damascus, Syria | Arabic, Greek | Syria, Lebanon, Turkey, Jordan, Palestine, Israel, Iraq |
| Syriac Orthodox Church | Oriental Orthodox | 1.7 million | No | Assyrian and Aramean | Ancient: Antioch Modern: Cathedral of Saint George, Damascus, Syria; (historically Mor Hananyo Monastery, Tur Abdin) | Syriac | Syria, Lebanon, Jordan, Iraq, Turkey |
| Melkite Greek Catholic Church | Catholic | 1.6 million | Mixed | Greek and Byzantine | Ancient: Antioch Modern: Cathedral of Our Lady of the Dormition, Damascus, Syria | Arabic, Greek | Egypt, Palestine, Israel, Jordan, Lebanon, Sudan, Syria, Iraq |
| Chaldean Catholic Church | Catholic | 0.6 million | Mixed | Chaldean, Assyrian, Arab | Ancient: Seleucia-Ctesiphon Modern: Cathedral of Mary Mother of Sorrows, Baghdad, Iraq | Syriac, Arabic | Iraq, Iran, Turkey, Syria |
| Greek Orthodox Church of Alexandria | Eastern Orthodox | 0.5 – 2.9 million | Mixed | Greek and Byzantine | Ancient: Alexandria Modern: Cathedral of Evangelismos, Alexandria, Egypt | Arabic, Greek | Africa |
| Assyrian Church of the East | Church of the East | 0.5 million | No | Nestorian, Assyrian and Aramean | Ancient: Seleucia-Ctesiphon Modern: Ankawa, Erbil, Iraq | Syriac | Iraq, Iran, Syria |
| Syriac Catholic Church | Catholic | 0.2 million | Mixed | Assyrian or Aramean | Ancient: Antioch Modern: Syriac Catholic Cathedral of Saint Paul, Damascus, Syria | Syriac | Lebanon, Syria, Iraq, Turkey |
| Coptic Catholic Church | Catholic | 0.2 million | Mixed | Coptic, including Pharaonism | Ancient: Alexandria Modern: Cathedral of Our Lady of Egypt, Cairo, Egypt | Coptic, Arabic | Egypt |
| Greek Orthodox Church of Jerusalem | Eastern Orthodox | 0.2 million | Yes | Arab | Ancient: Jerusalem Modern: Church of the Holy Sepulchre, Jerusalem | Arabic, Greek | Palestine, Israel, Jordan |
| Ancient Church of the East | Church of the East | 0.1 million | No | Nestorian, Assyrian | Ancient: Seleucia-Ctesiphon Modern: Baghdad, Iraq | Syriac | Iraq |

=== Self-identification ===
Key schisms in Middle Eastern Christian denominations.

The issue of self-identification arises regarding specific Christian communities across the Arab world. A significant proportion of Maronites claim descent from the Phoenicians, whilst a significant proportion of Copts claim that they descend from the Ancient Egyptians.

==== Arab ====
The designation "Greek" in the Greek Orthodox Church and Melkite Greek Catholic Church refers to the use of Koine Greek in liturgy, used today alongside Arabic. As a result, the Greek dominated clergy was commonplace serving the Arabic speaking Christians, the majority who couldn't speak Greek. Some viewed Greek rule as cultural imperialism and demanded emancipation from Greek control, as well as the abolishment of the centralized structure of the institution via Arab inclusion in decision-making processes.

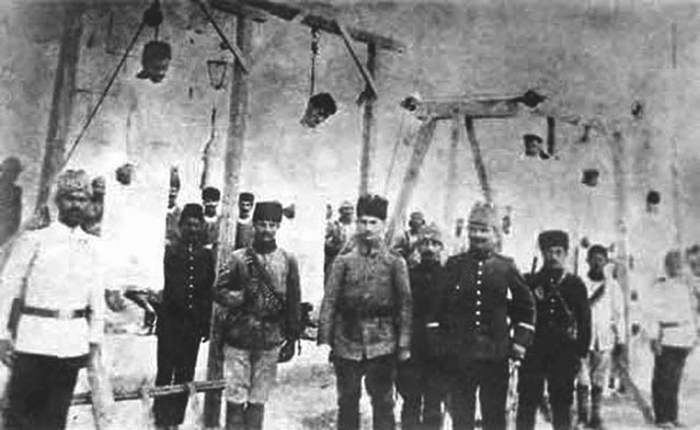
Djemal Pasha publicly executed Arab nationalists–many Christian–who espoused anti-Ottoman views in Syria and Lebanon (Ottoman Syria)

The struggle for the Arabization of the Eastern Orthodox Church against the Greek clerical hegemony in Palestine led Orthodox Christian intellectuals to rebel against the Church's Greek dominated hierarchy. The rebellion was divided between those who sought a common Ottoman cause against European intrusions and those who identified with Arab nationalism against pan-Turkic (Ottoman) nationalism. Its main advocates were well known community leaders and writers in Palestine, such as Ya'qub Farraj, Khalil al-Sakakini, Yusuf al-Bandak (publisher of Sawtal-Sha'b) and cousins Yousef and Issa El-Issa (founders of Falastin). The cousins were among the first to elucidate the Arab struggle against the Greek clerical hegemony of the Church of Jerusalem. Both Sakakini and El-Issa argued that the Palestinian and the Syrian (Antiochian) community constituted an oppressed majority, controlled and manipulated by a minority Greek clergy.

There have been numerous disputes between the Arab and the Greek leadership of the church in Jerusalem from the Mandate onwards. Jordan encouraged the Greeks to open the Brotherhood to Arab members of the community between 1948 and 1967 when the West Bank was under Jordanian rule. Land and political disputes have been common since 1967, with the Greek priests portrayed as collaborators with Israel. Land disputes include the sale of St. John's property in the Christian quarter, the transfer of fifty dunams near Mar Elias Monastery, and the sale of two hotels and twenty-seven stores on Omar Bin Al-Khattab square near the Church of the Holy Sepulchre. A dispute between the Palestinian Authority and the Greek Patriarch Irenaios led to the Patriarch being dismissed and demoted because of accusations of a real estate deal with Israel. It was later ruled uncanonical by Patriarch Bartholomew.

==== Rūm ====
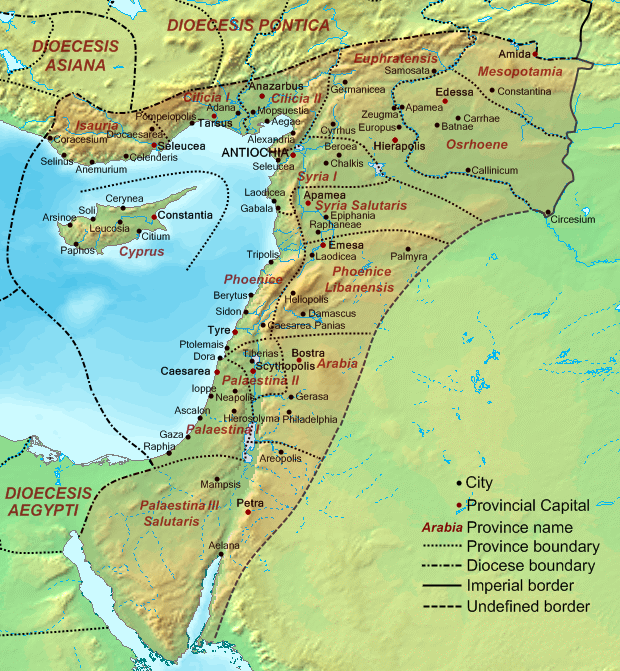
Map of the Diocese of the East 400 AD, homeland of the Christian Rūm; showing modern day Lebanon, Syria, Turkey, Israel, Palestine and Jordan

The homeland of the Antiochian Greek Christians, known as the Diocese of the East, was one of the major commercial, agricultural, religious, and intellectual areas of the Roman Empire, and its strategic location facing the Persian Sassanid Empire gave it exceptional military importance. They are either members of the Greek Orthodox Church of Antioch or the Melkite Greek Catholic Church, and they have ancient roots in the Levant; more specifically, the territories of Syria, Lebanon, Jordan and Hatay, which includes the city of Antakya (ancient Antioch). Antiochian Greeks constitute a multi-national group of people and thus construct their identity in relation to specific historical moments. Analyzing cultural identity as a conscious construction is more helpful than a simple labelling of ethnicity, thus the identity is assumed to accentuate the separate origin unique to the Christian Rūm (literally "Eastern Romans") of the Levant. Some members of the community also call themselves Melkite, which means "monarchists" or "supporters of the emperor" (a reference to their past allegiance to Macedonian and Roman imperial rule) although in the modern era, that term tends to be more commonly used by followers of the Melkite Greek Catholic Church.

The Orthodox Christian congregation was included in an ethno-religious community, Rum Millet ("Roman nation"), during the Ottoman Empire. Its name was derived from the former Eastern Roman (Byzantine) subjects of the Ottoman Empire, but all Orthodox Greeks, Bulgarians, Albanians, Aromanians, Megleno-Romanians and Serbs, as well as Georgians and Middle Eastern Christians, were considered part of the same millet in spite of their differences in ethnicity and language. Belonging to this Orthodox commonwealth became more important to the common people than their ethnic origins.

==== Chaldean ====
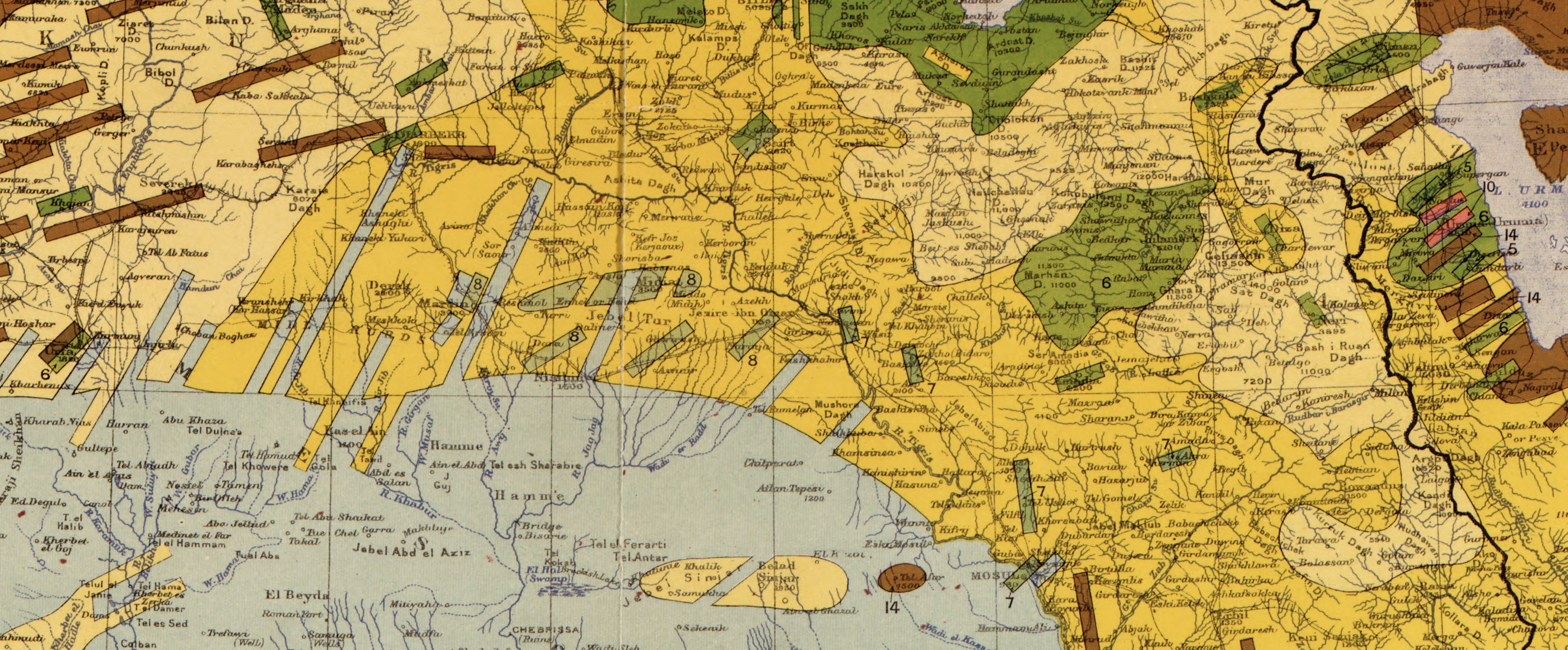
Maunsell's map, a Pre-World War I British Ethnographical Map of the Middle East showing "Nestorians" (6), "Chaldeans" (7) and "Jacobites" (8).

The Chaldean Church, which had been part of the Nestorian Church, or Church of the East, until 1552–3, began in earnest to distance itself from the Nestorians who were now seen as the 'uncouth Assyrians'. During this period, many Chaldeans began identifying themselves solely by their religious community, and later as Iraqis, Iraqi Christians, or Arab Christians, rather than with the Assyrian community as a whole. The first split for the two groups came in 431, when they broke away from what was to become the Catholic Church over a theological dispute. The reverberation of religious animosity between these communities still continues today, a testament to the machinations of power politics in the nation-building of the Middle East. The Iraqi Chaldeans positioned themselves deliberately as a religious group within the Arab Iraqi nation. The Arab identity of the state was not only acceptable to them, but was even staunchly endorsed. The Arab nationalism they supported did not discriminate according to religion and was therefore also acceptable to them. Today, due to both forced and accepted Arabization, many Chaldeans identify themselves situationally as Arabs.

The Assyrians form the majority of Christians in Iraq, northeast Syria, south-east Turkey and north-west Iran. They are specifically defined as non-Arab indigenous ethnic group, including by the governments of Iraq, Lebanon, Iran, Syria, Israel, and Turkey.

== Culture ==
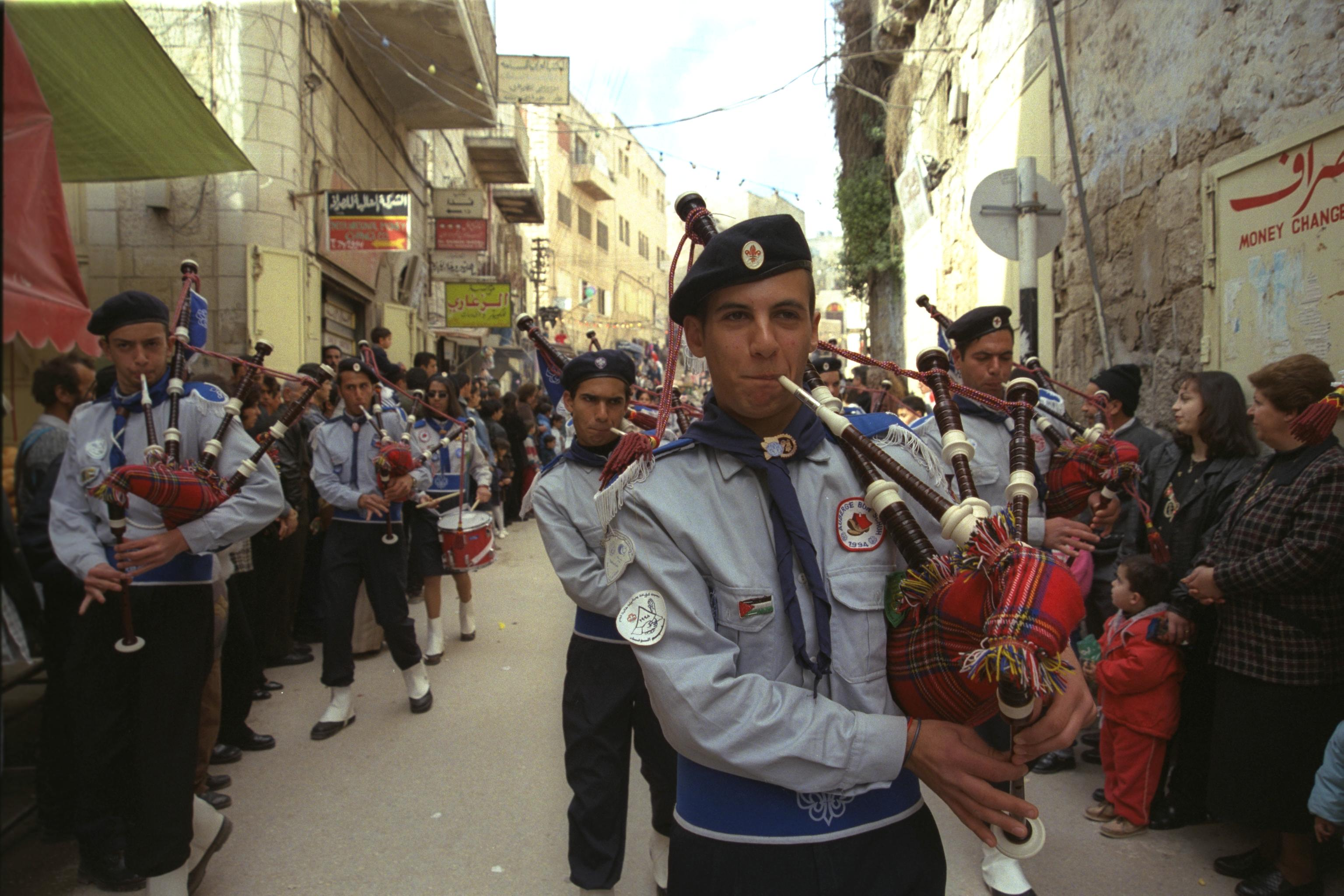
Greek Orthodox Christmas procession in Bethlehem

Christianity in the Middle East represents a large part of the region's diverse culture mosaic. The region includes the oldest Christian monuments in addition to the liturgy and hymns that have spread since the second century AD throughout the region. Translations of the Bible into Arabic are known from the early Christian churches in the Levant, Egypt, Mesopotamia, Malta, the Maghreb, and Al-Andalus. Christians produced hundreds of manuscripts containing portions of the Bible in Arabic. Christian Arabs celebrate various holy days, including the Feast of the Cross, Eid il-Burbara, Christmas, the Feast of St. George, and the Feast of the Prophet Elijah. In Christian traditions, Sergius and Bacchus are considered the patron saints of Arabs.

There are no major cultural differences between Christian Arabs and the general Arab environment. Some differences arise from religious differences, for example, customs and traditions related to marriage or burial. Also, in social events in which the participants are Christians, alcoholic beverages are often served (apart from those denominations that encourage teetotalism), unlike what is prevalent in most Arab societies because Islamic law forbids strong drink. Christian cuisine is similar to other Middle Eastern cuisines; unlike in Jewish cuisine and Islamic cuisines in the region, pork is allowed among Arab Christians, though it is not widely consumed. Male circumcision is near-universal among Christian Arabs, and they practice it shortly after birth as part of a rite of passage, though the practice of circumcision was dropped in the New Testament, meaning that the mainstream Churches do not oblige their followers to do so. In some Eastern Christian denominations, such as Coptic Christianity, male circumcision is an established practice, and require that their male members undergo circumcision shortly after birth as part of a rite of passage.

== Demographics ==
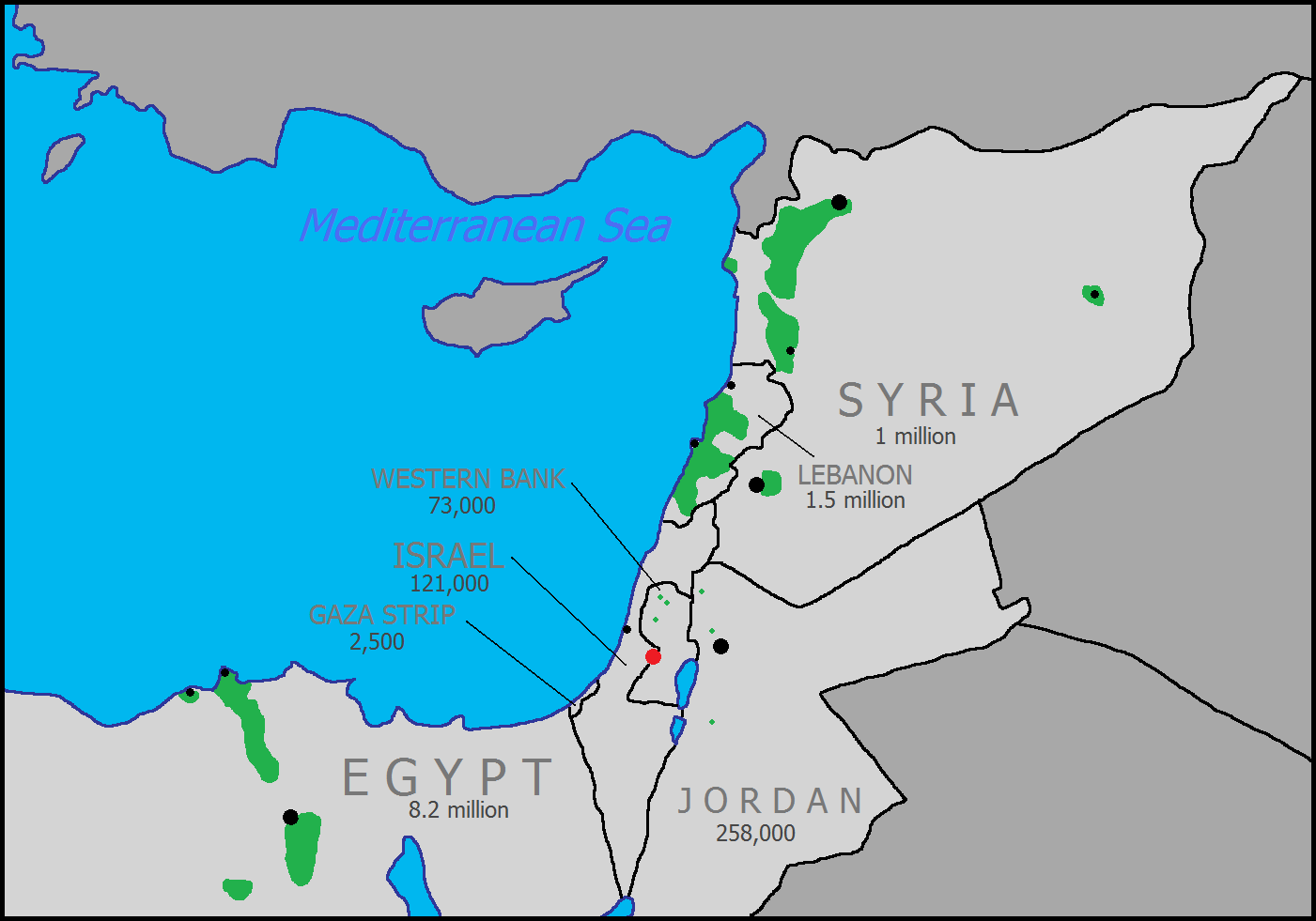
Arab Christian majority areas

Arab Christian communities can be found throughout the Arab world.

=== Algeria ===
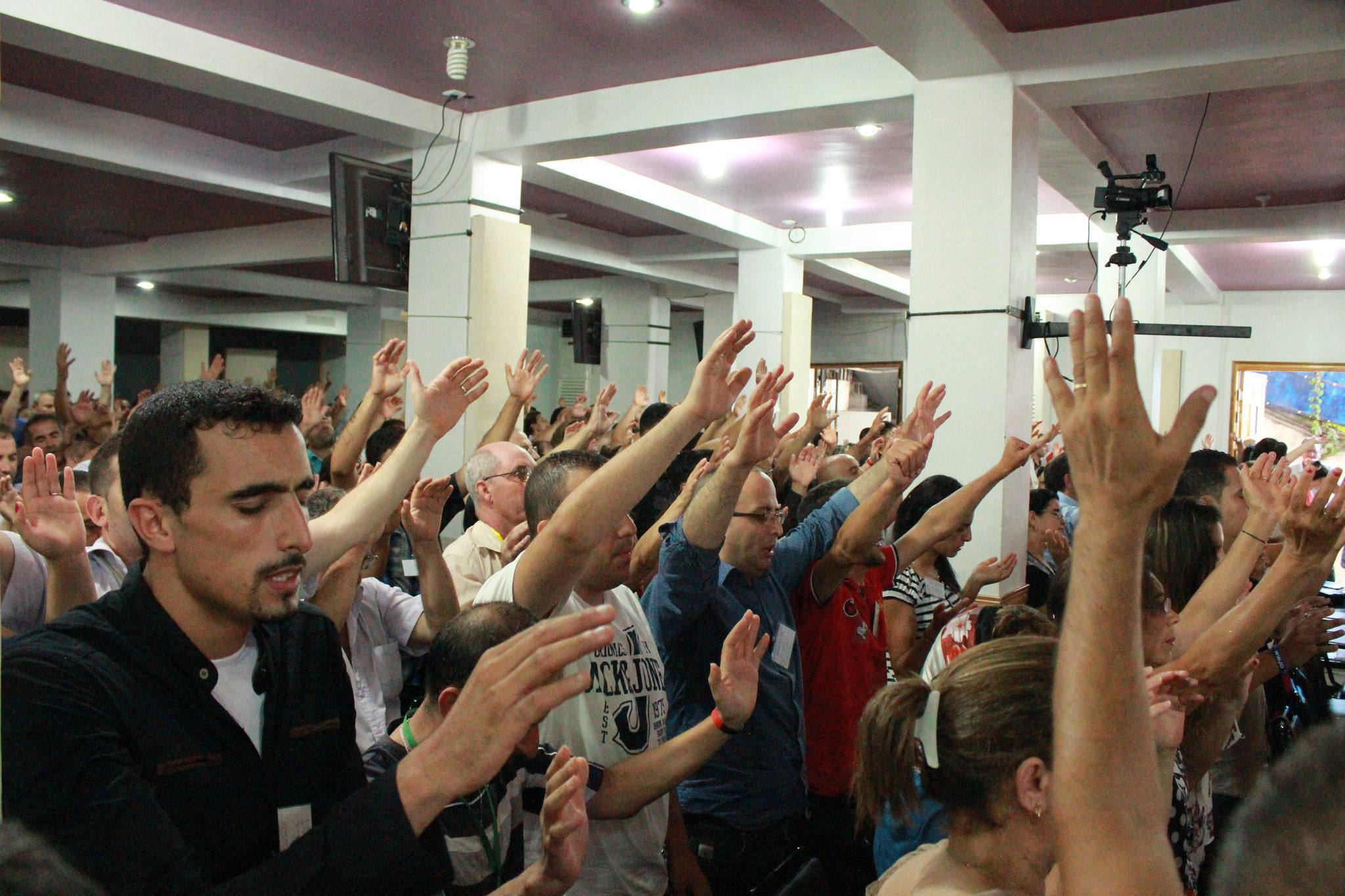
Kabyle Christians from Algeria

Christianity came to Algeria in the Roman era, and declined after the arrival of Islam in the 7th century. A notable Berber Christian of Algeria was Saint Augustine and his mother Saint Monica, important saints in Christianity. Prior to independence from France in 1962, Algeria was home to 1.4 million pieds-noirs (ethnic Europeans who were mostly Catholic). Arguably, many more Maghrebi Christians live in France than in North Africa, due to the exodus of the pieds-noirs in the 1960s.

In 2009, the percentage of Christians in Algeria was less than 2%. In this same survey, the United Nations counted 100,000 Catholics and 45,000 Protestants in the country. A 2015 study estimates 380,000 Muslims converted to Christianity in Algeria. Conversions have been most common in the region of Kabylie. Charles de Foucauld was renowned for his missions in Algeria among Muslims, including Arabs.

=== Bahrain ===
Native Christians who hold Bahraini citizenship number approximately 1,000. The majority of Christians are originally from Iraq, Palestine and Jordan, with a small minority having lived in Bahrain for many centuries; the majority have been living as Bahraini citizens for less than a century. There are also smaller numbers of native Christians who originally hail from Lebanon, Syria, and India. The majority of Christian Bahraini citizens tend to be Orthodox Christians, with the largest church by membership being the Greek Orthodox Church. They enjoy many equal religious and social freedoms. Bahrain has Christian members in the Bahraini government.

=== Egypt ===
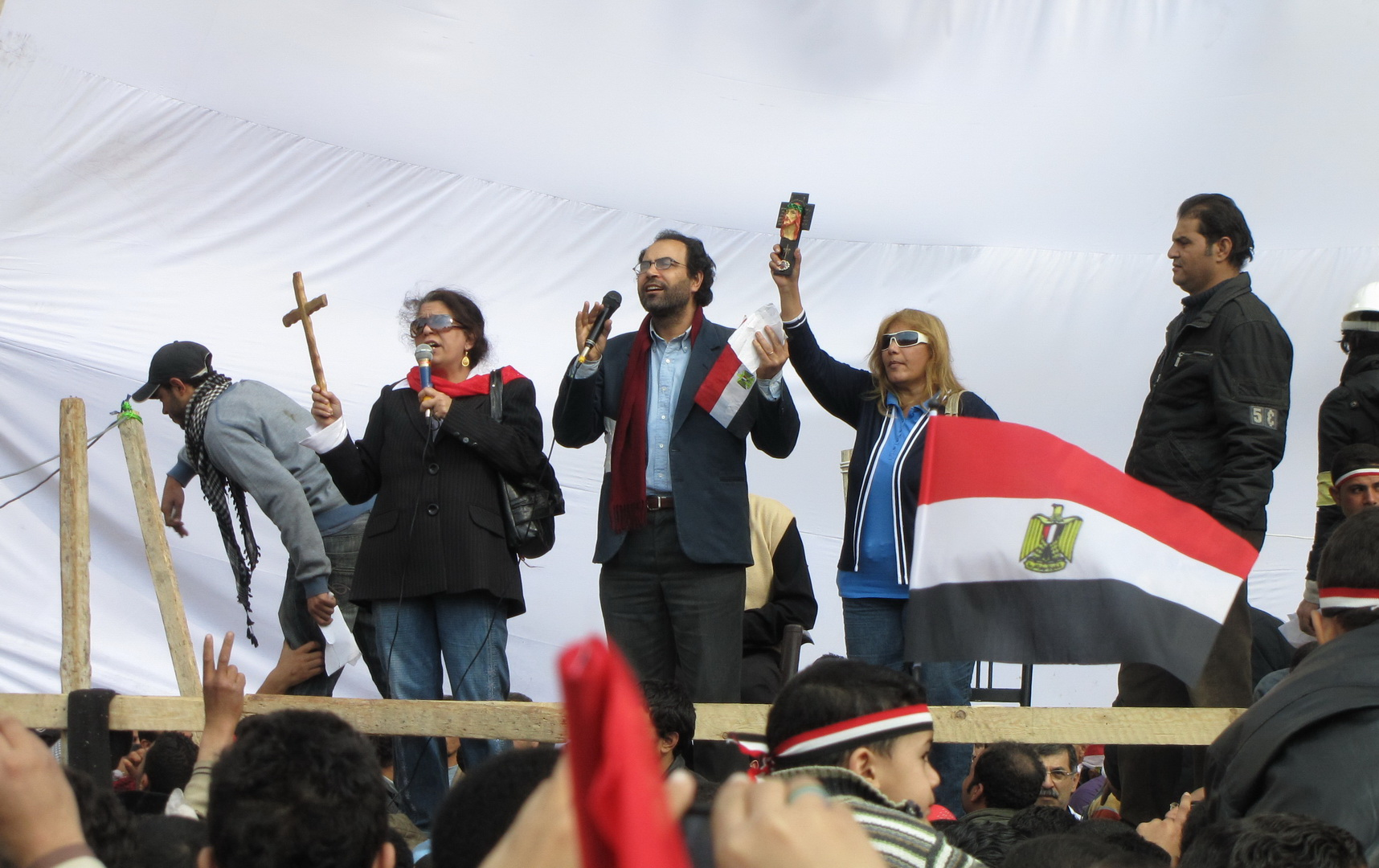
Copts praying in Tahrir

The Copts in Egypt constitute the largest Christian community in the Middle East, as well as the largest religious minority in the region, accounting for an estimated 10% of Egyptian population.

Since antiquity, there has always been a Levantine presence in Egypt, however they started becoming a distinctive minority in Egypt around the early 18th century. The Syro-Lebanese Christians of Egypt were highly influenced by European culture and established churches, printing houses and businesses across Egypt. Their aggregate wealth was reckoned at one and a half billion francs, 10% of the Egyptian GDP at the end of the 20th century. They took advantage of the Egyptian constitution that established the juridical equality of all citizens and granted the Syro-Lebanese Christians the fullness of civil rights, prior to the Nasser reforms.

=== Iraq ===
The Arab Christian community in Iraq is relatively small, and further dwindled due to the Iraq War to just several hundred thousand. Most Arab Christians in Iraq belong traditionally to Greek Orthodox and Catholic Churches and are concentrated in major cities such as Baghdad, Basra and Mosul. The vast majority of the remaining 450,000 to 900,000 Christians in Iraq are Assyrians.

Significant persecution of Iraqi Christians in Mosul and other areas held by ISIS occurred from 2014 onwards, with Christian houses identified as "N" for "Nasrani" (Christian).

=== Israel ===
In December 2009, 122,000 Arab Christians lived in Israel, as Arab citizens of Israel, out of a total of 151,700 Christian citizens. According to the Central Bureau of Statistics, on the eve of Christmas 2013, there were approximately 161,000 Christians in Israel, about 2 percent of the general population in Israel. 80% of the Christians are Arab with smaller Christian communities of ethnic Russians, Ukrainians, Greeks, Armenians, and Assyrians. As of 2014 the Melkite Greek Catholic Church was the largest Christian community in Israel, where about 60% of Israeli Christians belonged to the Melkite Greek Catholic Church, while around 30% of Israeli Christians belonged to the Greek Orthodox Church of Jerusalem. The Christian communities in Israel run numerous schools, colleges, hospitals, clinics, orphanages, homes for the elderly, dormitories, family and youth centers, hotels, and guesthouses.

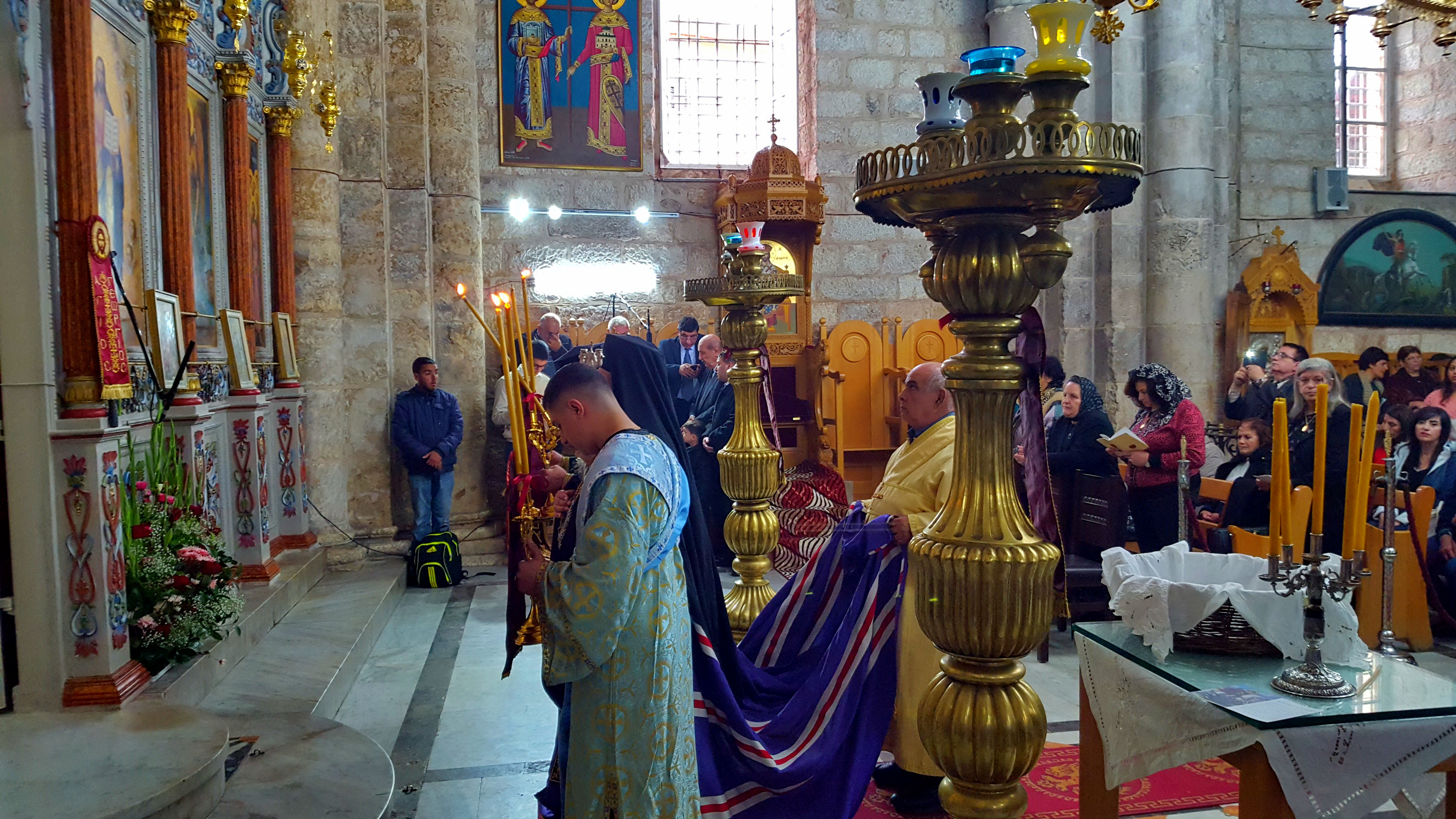
Christians worshipping the Divine Liturgy St George Church in the city of Lod

The city of Nazareth has the largest Arab Christian community in Israel, followed by the cities of Haifa, Jerusalem and Shefa-Amr. The Christian Arab communities in Nazareth and Haifa tend to be wealthier and better educated than Arabs elsewhere in Israel. Christians live in a number of other towns in Galilee either singly or mixed with Muslims and Druze, such as Abu Snan, Arraba, Bi'ina, Daliyat al-Karmel, Deir Hanna, Eilabun, Hurfeish, I'billin, Isfiya, Jadeidi-Makr, Jish, Kafr Kanna, Kafr Yasif, Kisra-Sumei, Maghar, Mazra'a, Muqeible, Peki'in, Rameh, Ras al-Ein, Reineh, Sakhnin, Shefa-Amr, Tur'an, Yafa an-Naseriyye and others have a presence of Arab Christian communities too as do other mixed cities, especially Jerusalem and Tel Aviv-Jaffa, Ramleh, Lod, Acre, Nof HaGalil, and Ma'alot Tarshiha. It is reported that all the inhabitants of Fassuta and Mi'ilya are Melkite Christians.

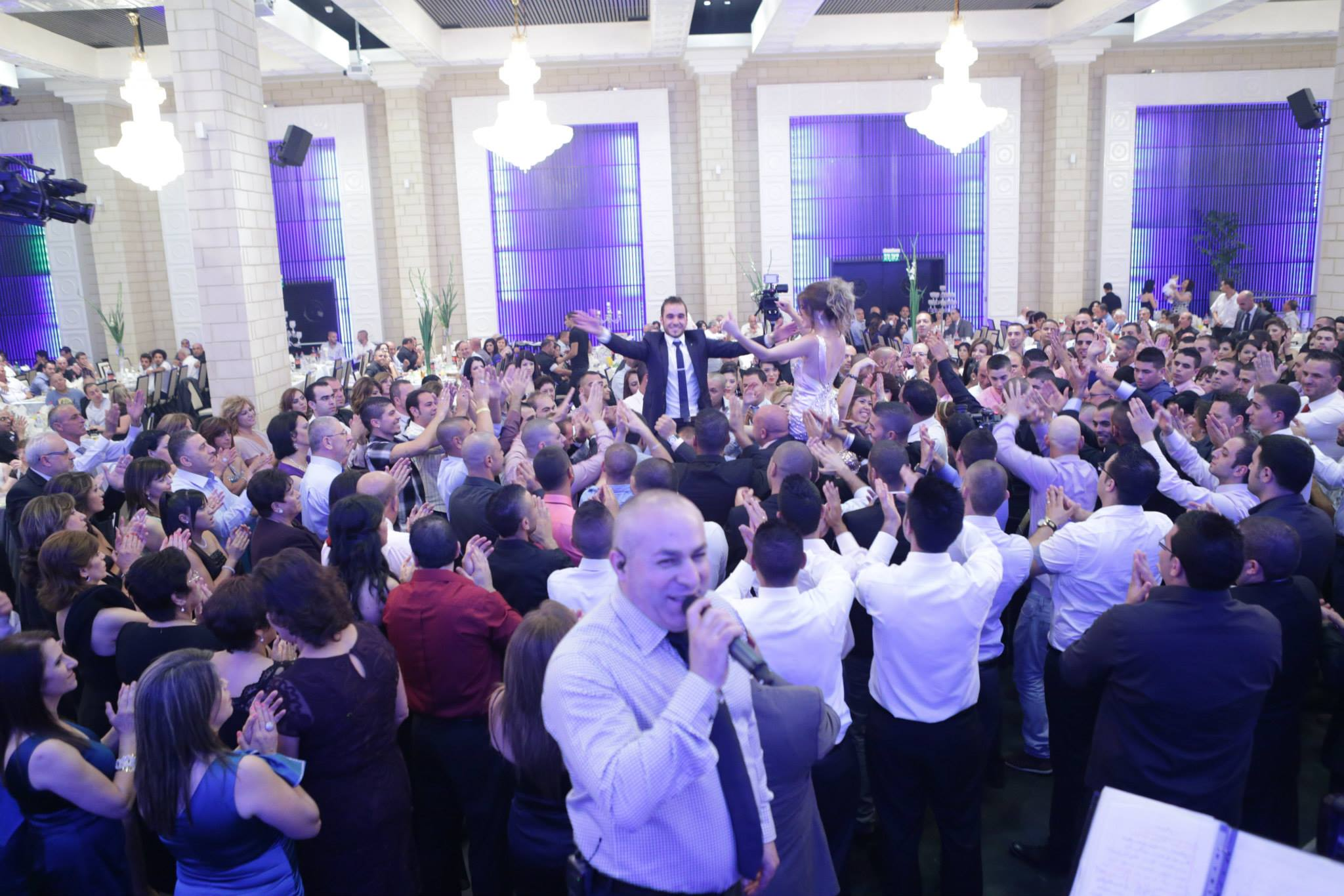
Arab Christian wedding in Galilee

Arab Christians are one of the most educated groups in Israel. Maariv has described the Christian Arab sectors as "the most successful in the education system". Statistically, Christian Arabs in Israel have the highest rates of educational attainment among all religious communities. According to a data by Israel Central Bureau of Statistics in 2010, 63% of Israeli Christian Arabs have had college or postgraduate education, the highest of any religious and ethno-religious group. Christian Arabs also have one of the highest rates of success in the matriculation examinations per capita, (73.9%) in 2016 both in comparison to Muslims, Druze, Jews and all students in the Israeli education system as a group. Arab Christians were also the vanguard in terms of eligibility for higher education. They have attained a bachelor's degree and academic degree more than Jewish, Muslims and Druze per capita. The rate of students studying in the field of medicine was also higher among the Christian Arab students, compared with all the students from other sectors. Despite the fact that Arab Christians only represent 2.1% of the total Israeli population, in 2014 they accounted for 17.0% of the country's university students, and for 14.4% of its college students. Socio-economically, Arab Christians are closer to the Jewish population than to the Muslim population. They have the lowest incidence of poverty and the lowest percentage of unemployment which is 4.9% compared to 6.5% among Jewish men and women. They have also the highest median household income among Arab citizens of Israel and second highest median household income among the Israeli ethno-religious groups. According to study the majority of Christians in Israel (68.2 per cent) are employed in the service sector, i.e. banks, insurance companies, schools, tourism, hospitals etc. Among Arab Christians in Israel, some emphasize pan-Arabism, whilst a small minority enlists in the Israel Defense Forces.

=== Jordan ===
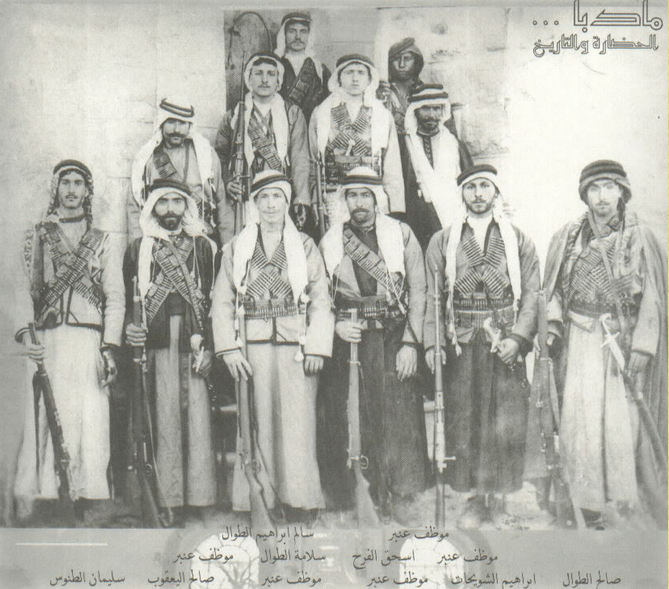
A small percentage of Jordanian Christians are ethnically Bedouin. This picture shows Arab Christian tribalists from the city of Madaba

Jordan contains some of the oldest Christian communities in the world, their presence dating back to the first century AD. Today, Christians make up about 4% of the population, down from 20% in 1930. This is due to high immigration rates of Muslims into Jordan, higher emigration rates of Christians to the west and higher birth rates for Muslims. Christians in Jordan are exceptionally well integrated in the Jordanian society and enjoy a high level of freedom. Christians are allotted nine out of a total of 130 seats in the Parliament of Jordan, and also hold important ministerial portfolios, ambassadorial appointments, and positions of high military rank. All Christian religious ceremonies are publicly celebrated in Jordan.

Jordanian Arab Christians (some have Palestinian roots since 1948) number around 221,000, according to a 2014 estimate by the Orthodox Church. The study excluded minority Christian groups and the thousands of western, Iraqi and Syrian Christians residing in Jordan. Another estimate suggests the Orthodox number 125–300,000, Catholics at 114,000 and Protestants at 30,000 for a total 270–450,000. Most native Christians in Jordan identify themselves as Arab, though there are also significant Assyrian and Armenian populations in the country. There has also been an influx of Christian refugees escaping Daesh, mainly from Mosul, Iraq, numbering about 7000 and 20,000 from Syria. King Abdullah II of Jordan has made firm statements about Arab Christians:

"Let me say once again: Arab Christians are an integral part of my region's past, present, and future."

=== Kuwait ===
Kuwait's native Christian population exists, though is essentially small. There are between 259 and 400 Christian Kuwaiti citizens. Christian Kuwaitis can be divided into two groups. The first group includes the earliest Kuwaiti Christians, who originated from Iraq and Turkey. They have assimilated into Kuwaiti society, like their Muslim counterparts, and tend to speak Arabic with a Kuwaiti dialect; their food and culture are also predominantly Kuwaiti. They makeup roughly a quarter of Kuwait's Christian population. The rest (roughly three-quarters) of Christian Kuwaitis make up the second group. They are more recent arrivals in the 1950s and 1960s, mostly Kuwaitis of Palestinian ancestry who were forced out of Palestine after 1948. There are also smaller numbers who originally hail from Syria and Lebanon. This second group is not as assimilated as the first group, as their food, culture, and Arabic dialect still retain a Levant feel. However, they are just as patriotic as the former group, and tend to be proud of their adopted homeland, with many serving in the army, police, civil, and foreign service. Most of Kuwait's citizen Christians belong to 12 large families, with the Shammas (from Turkey) and the Shuhaibar (from Palestine) families being some of the more prominent ones.

=== Lebanon ===
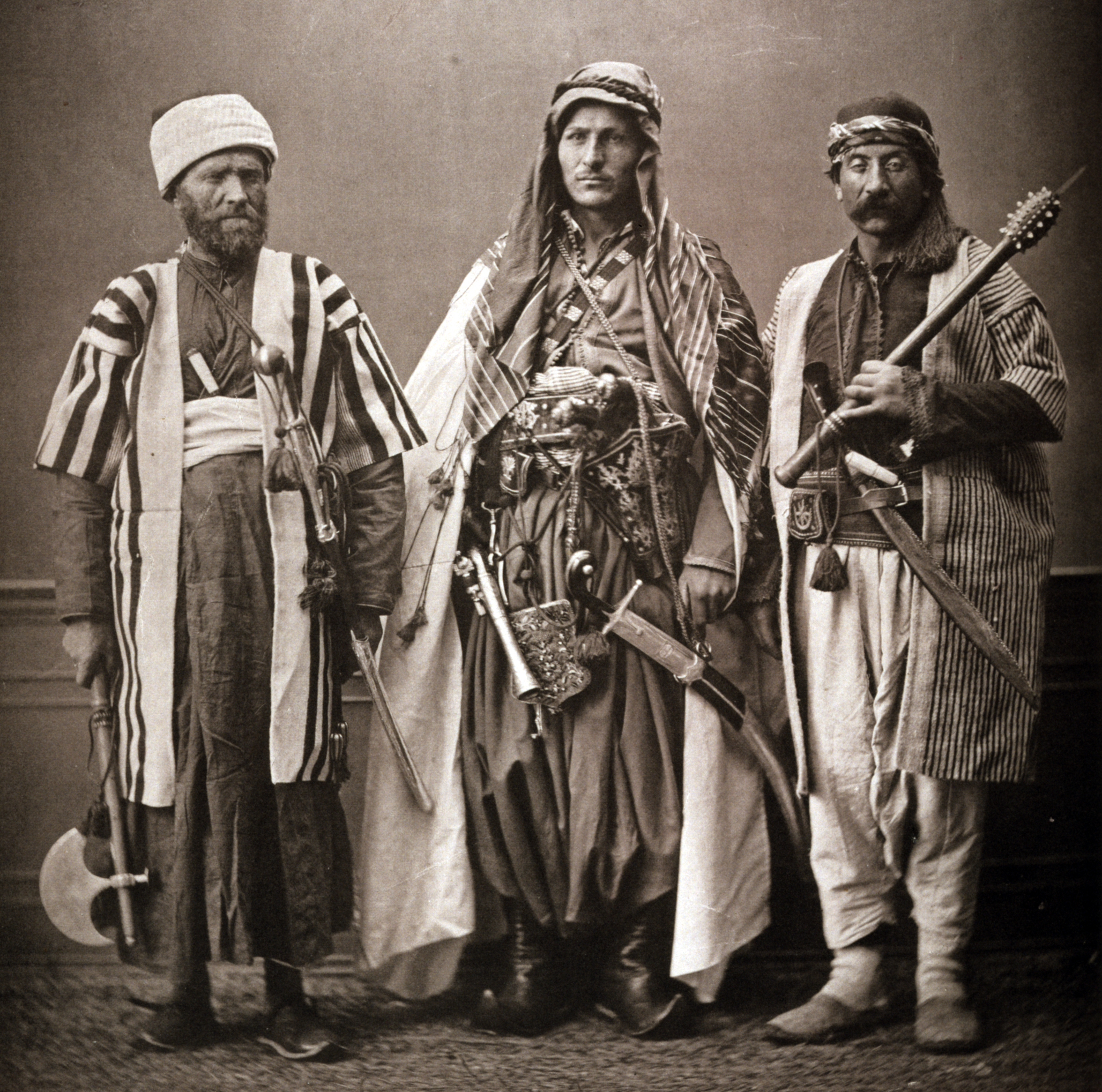
Left to right: Christian mountain dweller from Zahlé, Christian mountain dweller of Zgharta, and a Druze (1873)

Lebanon holds the largest number of Christians in the Arab world proportionally and falls just behind Egypt in absolute numbers. About 350,000–450,000 of Christians in Lebanon are Orthodox and Melkites, while the most dominant group are Maronites with about 1 million population, whose Arab identity is contentiously disputed. Lebanese Christians are the only Christians in the Middle East with a sizable political role in the country. In accordance with the National Pact, the President of Lebanon must be a Maronite Christian, the Deputy Speaker of the Parliament and Deputy Prime Minister a Greek Orthodox Christian and Melkites and Protestants have nine reserved seats in the Parliament of Lebanon. The Maronites and the Druze founded modern Lebanon in the early eighteenth century, through the ruling and social system known as the "Maronite-Druze dualism" in Mount Lebanon Mutasarrifate.

Christians constituted 60% of the population of Lebanon in 1932. The exact number of Christians in modern Lebanon is uncertain because no official census has been made in Lebanon since 1932. Lebanese Christians belong mostly to the Maronite and Greek Orthodox Churches, with sizable minorities belonging to the Melkite Greek Catholic Church and Armenian Apostolic Church. The community of Armenians in Lebanon is politically and demographically significant.

=== Libya ===
Christianity had a presence in Tripolitania and Cyrenaica in Roman times. The Coptic population in Libya is estimated to number 60,000. A 2015 estimates some 1,500 Christian believers from a Muslim background residing in the country.

=== Morocco ===
Christianity in Morocco appeared during the Roman times, when it was practiced by Christian Berbers in Roman Mauretania Tingitana, although it disappeared after the Islamic conquests. Morocco was home to half a million Christian Europeans (mostly of Spanish and French ancestry) prior to Moroccan independence. The U.S. State Department estimates the number of Arab and Berber Christians in Morocco as more than 40,000. Pew-Templeton estimates the number of Moroccan Christians at 20,000. The number of the Moroccans who converted to Christianity (most of them secret worshippers) are estimated between 8,000 and 50,000.

=== Palestine ===
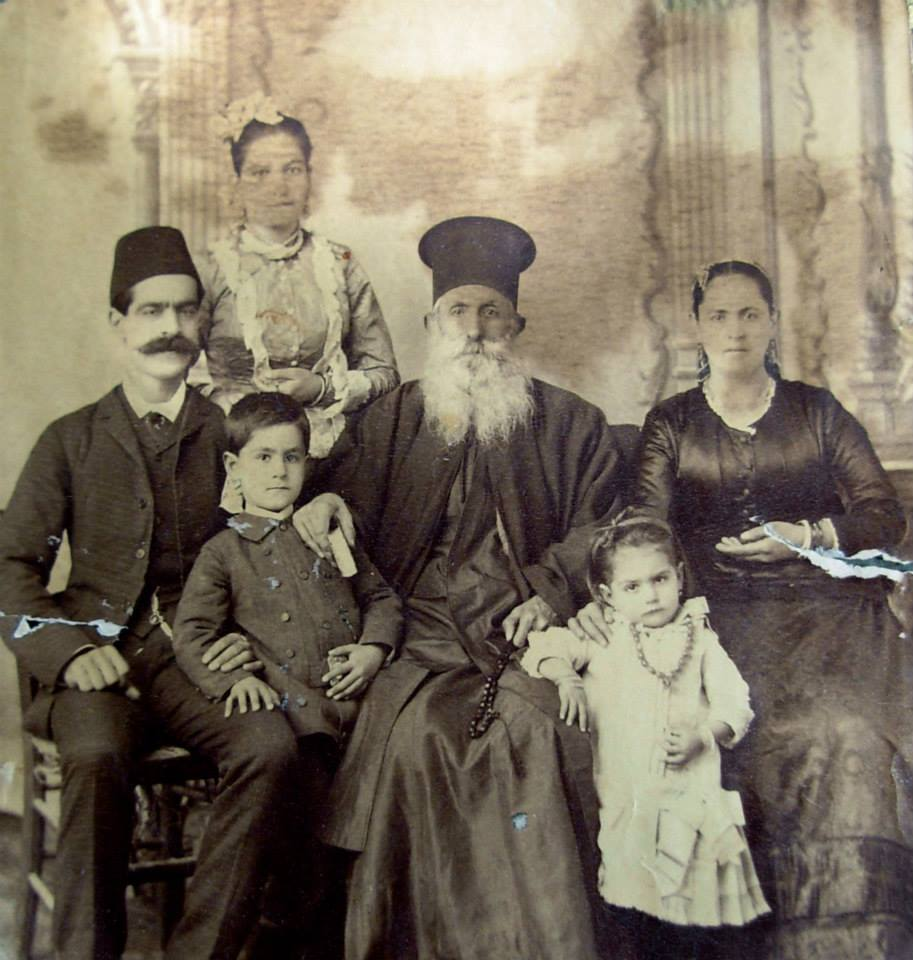
Married Eastern Orthodox priest from Jerusalem with his family (three generations), circa 1893

Most of the Palestinian Christians claim descent from the first Christian converts, Arameans, Ghassanid Arabs and Greeks who settled in the region. Between 36,000 and 50,000 Christians live in Palestine, most of whom belong to the Orthodox (Including Greek, Syriac and Armenian Orthodox), Catholic (Roman and Melchite) churches and Evangelical communities. The majority of Palestinian Christians live in the Bethlehem and Ramallah areas with a less number in other places. In 2007, just before the Hamas takeover of Gaza, there were 3,200 Christians living in the Gaza Strip. Half the Christian community in Gaza fled to the West Bank and abroad after the Hamas take-over in 2007. However, Palestinian Christians in Gaza face restrictions on their freedom of movement by the Israeli blockade, which has been cited as one of the reasons contributing to their dwindling numbers.

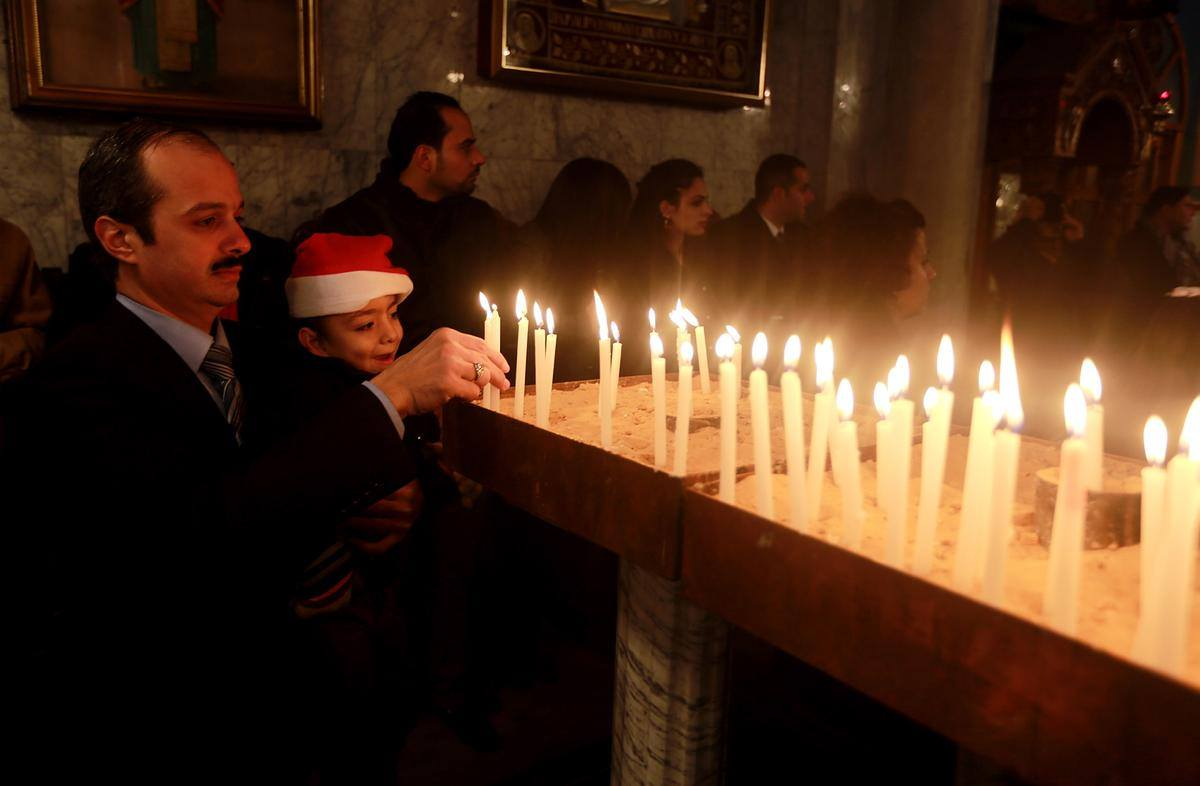
Christians from Gaza

Many Palestinian Christians hold high-ranking positions in Palestinian society, particularly at the political and social levels. They manage the high ranking schools, universities, cultural centers and hospitals, however, Christian communities in the Palestinian Authority and the Gaza Strip have greatly dwindled over the last two decades. The causes of the Palestinian Christian exodus are widely debated and it started since the Ottoman times. Reuters reports that many Palestinian Christians emigrate in pursuit of better living standards. The Vatican saw the Israeli occupation and the general conflict in the Holy Land as the principal reasons for the Christian exodus from the territories. The decline of the Christian community in Palestine follows the trend of Christian emigration from the Muslim-dominated Middle East. Some churches have attempted to ameliorate the rate of emigration of young Christians by building subsidized housing for them and expanding efforts at job training.

=== Saudi Arabia ===
Jubail Church is a 4th-century church building near Jubail. Some parts of modern Saudi Arabia, such as Najran, were predominantly Christian until the 7th to 10th century, when most Christians were expelled, converted to Islam or left the region via the Sea route to Asia, with which merchant trade already existed, others migrated north to Jordan and Syria. Some Arab Christians who remained living as crypto-Christians. Some Arabian tribes, such as Banu Taghlib and Banu Tamim, followed Christianity.

Today, Saudi Arabia's Arab Christian population consists mostly of Lebanese and Syrians living in diaspora.

=== Sudan ===
There were approximately 1.1 million Catholics in Sudan, about 3.2 percent of the total population. Sudan forms one ecclesiastical province, consisting of one archdiocese (the Archdiocese of Khartoum) and one suffragan diocese (the Diocese of El Obeid). The vast majority of Sudan's Catholics ended up in South Sudan after the partition.

=== Syria ===
The Arab Christians of Syria are predominantly Rūm-Orthodox and Melkite-Catholic, with some Roman-Catholics. Non-Arab Syrian Christians include Assyrians (also known as Chaldeans or Syriacs), Greeks and Armenians. Assyrian refugees fled to Syria after the massacres in Turkey and Iraq during World War I, also known as Sayfo in Syriac-Aramaic, and later after the events in Iraq in 2003. Due to the Syrian civil war, a large number of Christians fled the country to Lebanon, Jordan, and Europe. However, a significant portion of the population still resides in Syria, with some being internally displaced. Christian militias fought in the Syrian civil war, including the Khabur Guards and the pro-Assad Guardians of the Dawn. Western Aramaic is spoken by Christian and Muslim Arameans (or Syriacs) alike in remote villages in the Qalamoun mountains, including Maaloula, Jubb'adin and Bakh'a.

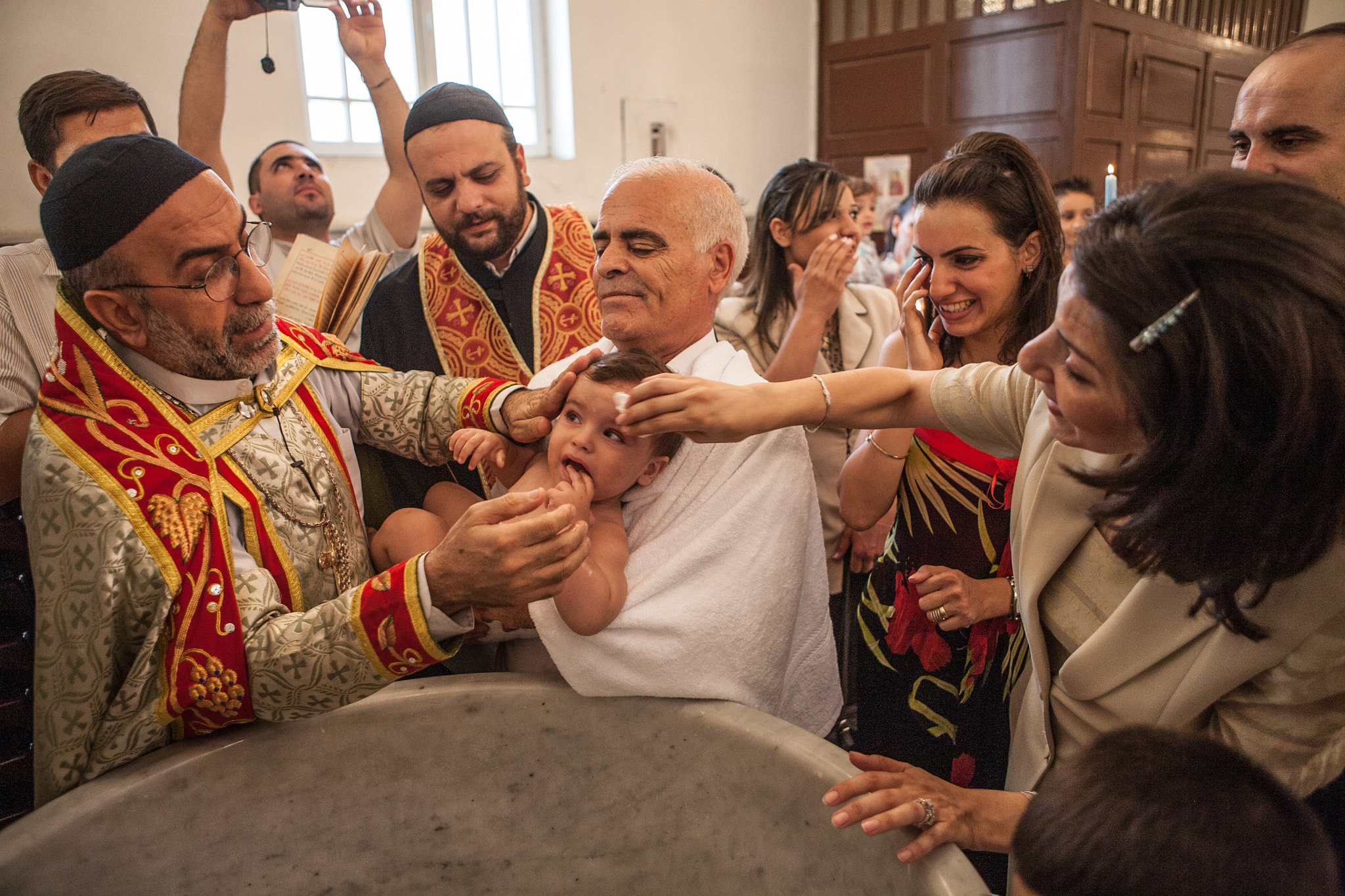
Baptism of a baby in Syria

The largest Christian denomination in Syria is the Greek-Orthodox Church, primarily consisting of Arab Christians, followed by the Syriac-Orthodox Church, whose followers often identify as Assyrian or Syriac. The combined population of Syria and Lebanon in 1910 was estimated at 30% in a population of 3.5 million. According to the 1960 census in Syria which recorded just over 4.5 million inhabitants, Christians formed just under 15% of the population (or 675,000). Since 1960 the population of Syria has increased five-fold, but the Christian population only 3.5 times. Due to political reasons, no newer census has been taken since. Most recent estimates prior to the Syrian civil war suggested that overall Christians were about 10% of the overall population of Syrian 23 million citizens, due to having lower birth rates and higher emigration rates than their Muslim compatriots.

Although religious freedom is allowed in the Syrian Arab Republic, all citizens of Syria including Christians, are subject to the Shari'a-based personal status laws regulating child custody, inheritance, and adoption. For example, in the case of divorce, a woman loses the right to custody of her sons when they reach the age of thirteen and her daughters when they reach the age of fifteen, regardless of religion. Since the fall of the Assad regime, the situation has deteriorated further, with Christians facing increased persecution by armed Islamist groups and constitutional changes affecting their rights.

=== Tunisia ===
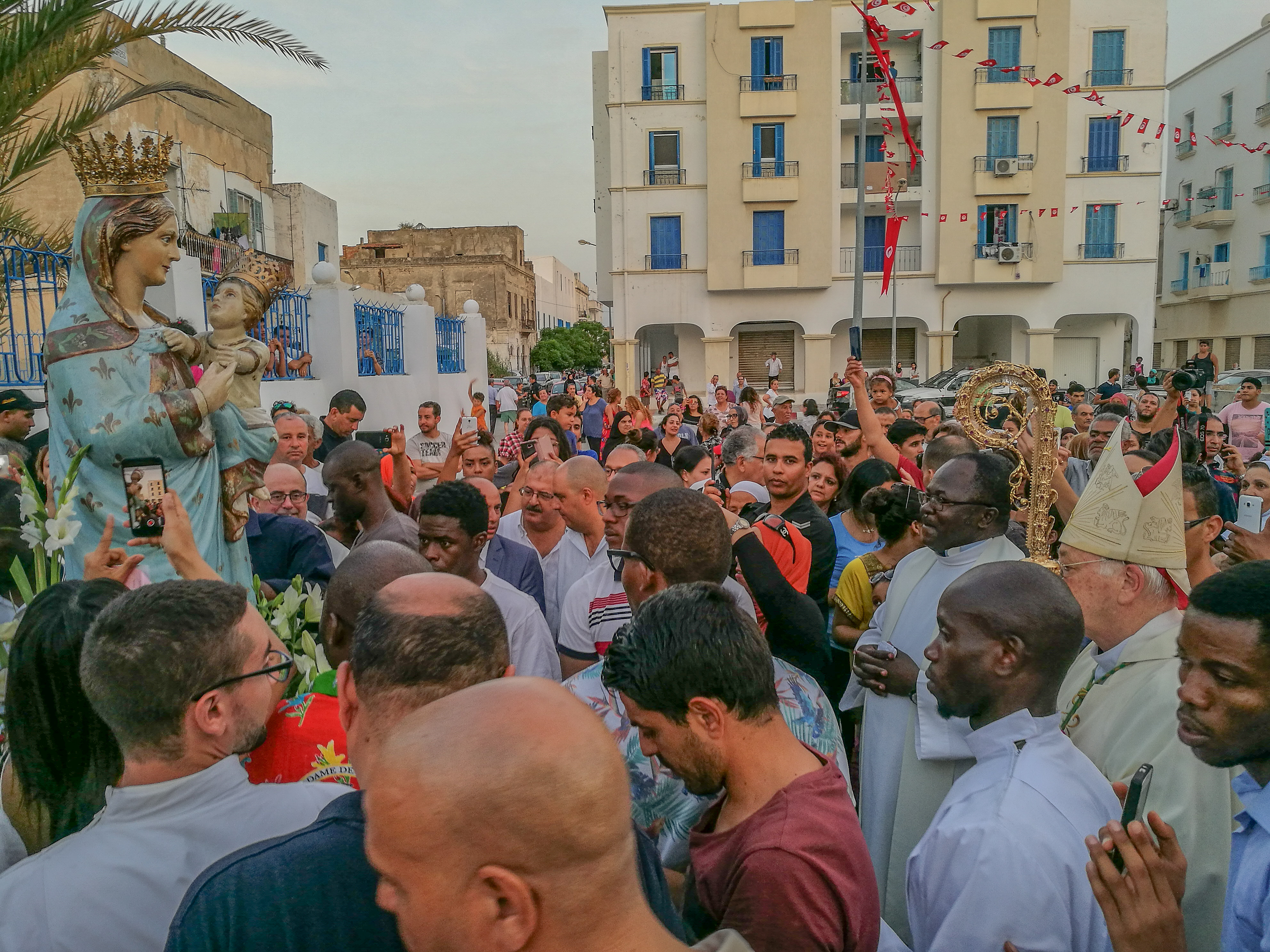
Our Lady of Trapani procession in La Goulette

Christianity came in Tunisia during Roman rule. However, after the arrival of Islam, the population of Christians decreased in the country. Prior to Tunisian independence, Tunisia was home to 255,000 Christian Europeans (mostly of Italian and Maltese ancestry). The International Religious Freedom Report of 2022 reported that the Christian community numbered 50,000 people, 30,000 of whom were Catholics. In the Annuario Pontificio of 2018, the number of Catholics is estimated to have risen to 30,700. However, the number of Tunisian Christians is estimated to be around 23,500.

The Catholic Church in Tunisia operates 12 churches, nine schools and several libraries throughout the country. In addition to holding religious services, the Catholic Church opened a monastery, freely organized cultural activities, and performed charitable work throughout Tunisia. According to church leaders, there are 5,000 practicing Protestant Christians, most of them are Tunisians who converted to Christianity. There is also a small community of Jehovah's Witnesses numbering around 50, only half of which identify as Arab.

=== Turkey ===
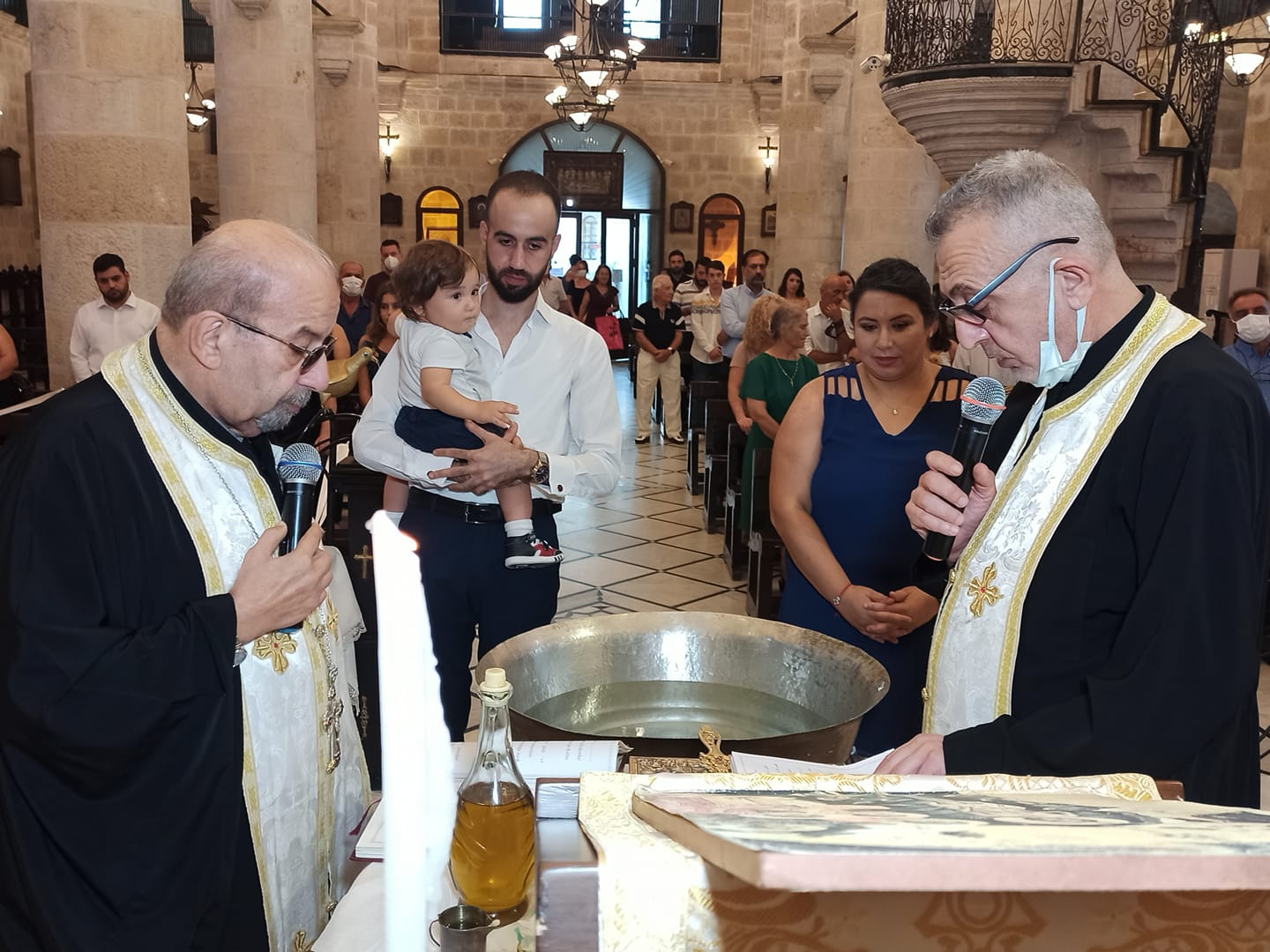
Antiochian Greek Christians from Antakya

Today, there are between 120,000 and 320,000 people of various Christian denominations in Turkey. Antiochian Greek Christians (or Melkites) who mostly live in Hatay Province, are one of the Arabic-speaking communities in Turkey and number approximately 18,000. They are often Rūm-Orthodox, but are sometimes known as "Arab Christians" due to their culture and heritage. Antioch, the capital of Hatay Province, is also the historical center of both the Greek Orthodox Church and Syriac Orthodox Church. Turkey is also home to several non-Arab native minorities, such as Armenians (around 70,000), Greeks (or Hellenes) (around 5,000) and Assyrians in the southeast (around 25,000). The village of Tokaçlı in Altınözü District has an entirely Arab Christian population and is one of the few Christian villages in Turkey.

=== Yemen ===
Christianity was a widespread religion on the territory of contemporary Yemen as early as the sixth century, before the arrival of Islam in Yemen. Today it is a minority religion in Yemen. Prior to the Yemeni Civil War, there were approximately 41,000 Christians in the country, a number which has greatly declined amid the conflict.

== See also ==
- Christianity and Islam
- Christianity in the Middle East
- Christian influences on the Islamic world
- List of Christian terms in Arabic
- Bible translations (Arabic)
- Arab Orthodox Society
- Arab Orthodox Movement
- John of Damascus

== Bibliography ==
- Oehring, Otmar (2017). "Christen in Syrien: Aktuelle Lage und Perspektiven" [Christians in Syria: Current situation and perspectives] (PDF). Analysen und Argumente (in German) (237). Sankt Augustin: Konrad Adenauer Foundation. ISBN 978-3-95721-279-5.
- Baarda, Tijmen C. (2020). "Arabic and the Syriac Christians in Iraq: Three Levels of Loyalty to the Arabist Project (1920–1950)". Arabic and its Alternatives. Brill. pp. 143–170. doi:10.1163/9789004423220_007. ISBN 978-90-04-42322-0. S2CID 216310663. Archived from the original on 20 October 2021.
- Corbon, Jean (1998). "The Churches of the Middle East: Their Origins and Identity, from their Roots in the Past to their Openness to the Present". Christian Communities in the Arab Middle East: The Challenge of the Future. Oxford: Clarendon Press. pp. 92–110. ISBN 978-0-19-829388-0. Archived from the original on 10 March 2021.
- Farag, Lois (2011). "The Middle East". Christianities in Asia. Chichester: John Wiley & Sons. pp. 233–254. ISBN 978-1-4443-9260-9. Archived from the original on 29 October 2021.
- Seth J. Frantzman, The Strength and the Weakness: The Arab Christians in Mandatory Palestine and the 1948 War, unpublished M.A thesis at The Hebrew University of Jerusalem.
- Griffith, Sidney H. (1997). "From Aramaic to Arabic: The Languages of the Monasteries of Palestine in the Byzantine and Early Islamic Periods". Dumbarton Oaks Papers. 51: 11–31. doi:10.2307/1291760. JSTOR 1291760.
- Griffith, Sidney H. (2002). The Beginnings of Christian Theology in Arabic: Muslim-Christian Encounters in the Early Islamic Period. Aldershot: Ashgate. ISBN 978-0-86078-889-8. Archived from the original on 29 October 2021.
- Griffith, Sidney H. (2013). The Bible in Arabic: The Scriptures of the People of the Book in the Language of Islam. Princeton: Princeton University Press. ISBN 978-1-4008-4658-0. Archived from the original on 29 October 2021.
- Jenkins, Philip (2011). "Disciples of All Nations". The Next Christendom: The Coming of Global Christianity (3rd ed.). New York City: Oxford University Press. pp. 21–50. doi:10.1093/0195146166.003.0002. ISBN 978-0-19-976746-5. LCCN 2010046058. OCLC 678924439. Archived from the original on 21 May 2021.
- Itamar Katz and Ruth Kark, 'The Greek Orthodox Patriarchate of Jerusalem and its congregation: dissent over real estate' in The International Journal of Middle East Studies, Vol. 37, 2005.
- Meyendorff, John (1989). Imperial unity and Christian divisions: The Church 450–680 A.D. Crestwood, NY: St. Vladimir's Seminary Press. ISBN 978-0-88141-056-3. Archived from the original on 14 May 2019.
- Trimingham, John Spencer (1979). Christianity Among the Arabs in pre-Islamic Times. London: Longman. ISBN 978-0-582-78081-1. Archived from the original on 29 October 2021.
- Waardenburg, Jean Jacques (2003). "The Earliest Relations of Islam with Other Religions: The Christians in Northern Arabia". Muslims and Others: Relations in Context. Religion and Reason. Vol. 41. Berlin: De Gruyter. pp. 94–109. doi:10.1515/9783110200959. ISBN 978-3-11-017627-8. Archived from the original on 29 October 2021.
- Wilken, Robert Louis (2013). "Arabic-Speaking Christians". The First Thousand Years: A Global History of Christianity. New Haven and London: Yale University Press. pp. 307–315. ISBN 978-0-300-11884-1. JSTOR j.ctt32bd7m.37. LCCN 2012021755. S2CID 160590164. Archived from the original on 13 April 2021.
- Winkler, Dietmar W. (2013). "Christianity in the Middle East: Some historical remarks and preliminary demographic figures". In Winkler, Dietmar W (ed.). Syriac Christianity in the Middle East and India: Contributions and Challenges. Piscataway, NJ: Gorgias Press. pp. 107–125. doi:10.31826/9781463235864-011. ISBN 978-1-4632-3586-4. Archived from the original on 29 October 2021.
