= Al-Asma'i (magazine) =

Arabic language magazine, 1908–1909

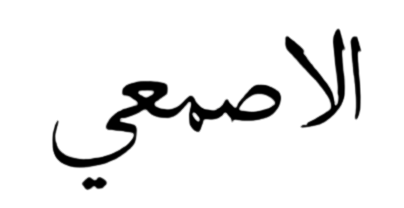

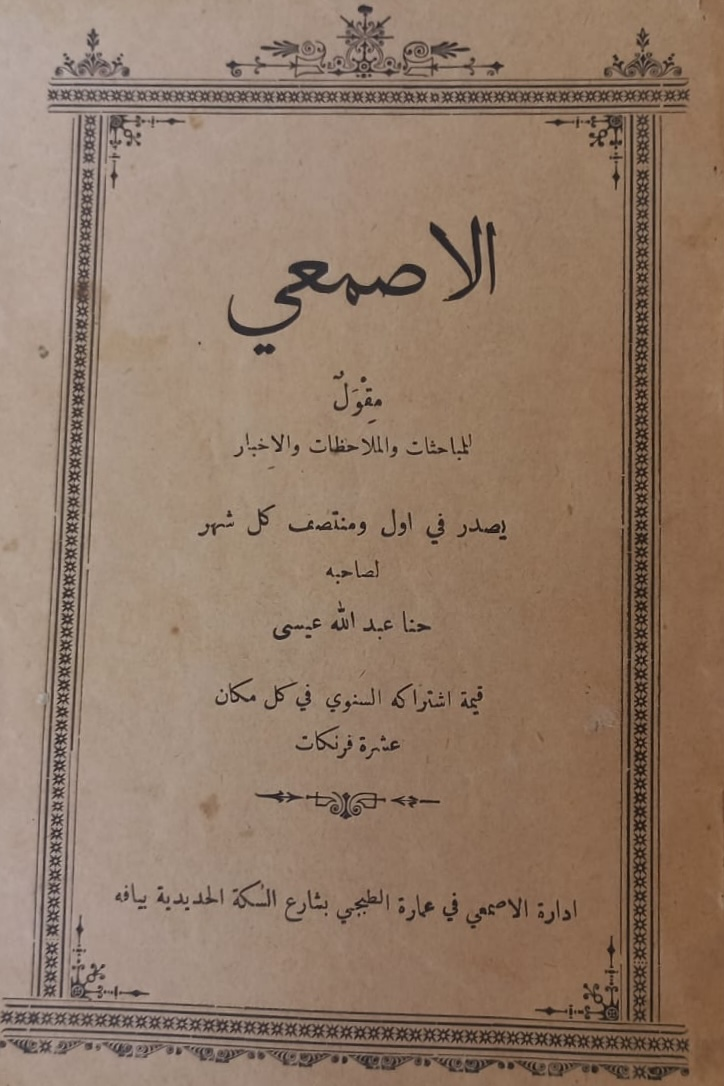
- Cover of the first issue, 1 September 1908
- Editor: Hanna El-Issa
- Editor: Khalil Sakakini
- Editor: Issaf Nashashibi
- Categories: Literary and political
- Frequency: Biweekly
- Founder: Hanna El-Issa
- First issue: 1 September 1908
- Final issue Number: 1 February 1909; 11
- Country: Ottoman Empire
- Based in: Edited in Jaffa, printed and distributed in Jerusalem
- Language: Arabic

Al-Asma'i (Arabic: الأصمعي, romanized: al-Aṣmaʿī, lit. 'The Hearing') was a short-lived Arabic literary and political biweekly magazine published in 1908 and 1909 in Palestine, then part of the Ottoman Empire. The magazine was one of the first publications to emerge in Palestine following the lifting of press censorship. It was printed and distributed in Jerusalem, while the magazine's headquarters and offices were in Jaffa.

The magazine was established by Hanna El-Issa, an Arab Christian businessman from Jaffa, in the wake of the 1908 Young Turk Revolution, which lifted press censorship in the empire. He was intermittently joined by writers including Khalil Sakakini, Isaaf Nashashibi, and Mananah Sidawi. The publication was named after Al-Asmaʿi, an early Arab scholar. The first edition of Al-Asma'i was published on 1 September 1908 and the last one on 1 February 1909, for a total of eleven editions over a period of five months.

Al-Asma'i presented issues facing Palestinian society, describing its difficulties and hardships, as well as conveying its demands. From the start, Al-Asma'i was opposed to and fearful of Zionism, and opposed Jewish immigration to Palestine from a perspective of local patriotism and Arab nationalism. The magazine frequently criticized the Zionist settlers and accused them of unfair competition with Arab craftsmen and traders, resenting the privileges they enjoyed from foreign powers, and considered them a threat to the local population.

It also focused on the Arab laity's struggle against the Greek clergy dominating the Jerusalem Orthodox Patriarchate, known as the Arab Orthodox Movement. It wrote about topics of interests to Arab peasants, such as agricultural development, and promoted women's issues, including the importance of their education. The magazine was discontinued due to the owner Hanna El-Issa's preoccupation with the Arab Orthodox Movement, and his death on 12 September 1909. His brother Yousef El-Issa and cousin Issa El-Issa, later went on to establish Falastin in 1911, which became one of the most influential Palestinian dailies.

== Background ==
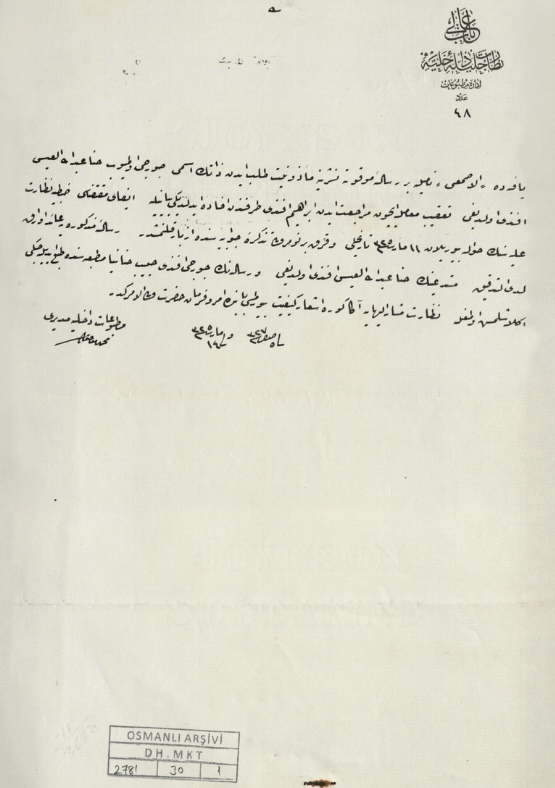
Ottoman licensing approval for Al-Asma'i, 1908

Prior to 1908, the Palestine region of the Ottoman Empire had no Arabic-language press, except for an official gazette published in Jerusalem in both Arabic and Turkish. But after the Young Turk Revolution that year, which lifted press censorship in the empire, fifteen publications emerged in Palestine. Many of these leading publications were edited or published by prominent figures from the Palestinian Arab Christian community, particularly members of the Orthodox Church. Al-Asma'i and the newspaper Al-Quds were among the earliest publications to have emerged in Palestine in 1908.

Al-Asma'i's founder and editor was Hanna El-Issa, an Arab Christian businessman from Jaffa, who was a member of the El-Issa family, which had pioneered newspaper publishing in Palestine. Hanna was the older brother to Yousef El-Issa, and cousin to Issa El-Issa, the two founders of Falastin in 1911, which became one of the most influential Palestinian dailies. Hanna also wrote for the Jerusalem-based newspaper Al-Quds owned by Jurji Habib Hannania, whose equipment he used for the printing of the magazine. Thus Al-Asma'i was printed and distributed in Jerusalem, but its headquarters and offices were in Jaffa.

Its first issue was published on 1 September 1908 and the last one was on 1 February 1909. Being published every two weeks, it had eleven editions published over five months. In addition to Hanna El-Issa, it was intermittently edited by a number of authors including Khalil Sakakini, Isaaf Nashashibi, and Mananah Sidawi. The magazine is often mentioned in Sakakini's memoirs; in one example, he mentions in a 1908 entry: "I washed and exercised, and after breakfast I sat at my desk, smoked my nargilah and proofread the drafts for al-Asma'i."

== Political positions ==
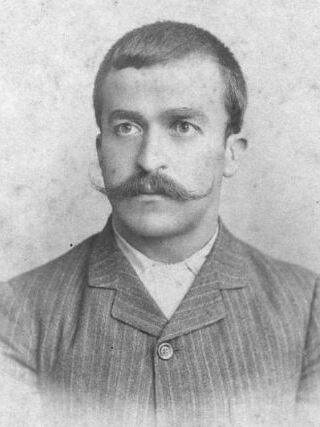
Portrait of Khalil Sakakini, an editor of Al-Asma'i, taken in Jerusalem, 1906

=== Arab Orthodox Movement ===
The Arab Orthodox Movement is a political and social movement dating since the late 19th century that aims for the Arabization of the Greek Orthodox Patriarchate of Jerusalem, which has jurisdiction over the Orthodox communities of the regions of Palestine, and Transjordan, to which most Christians there belong. Both editors Hanna El-Issa and Khalil Sakakini were Arab Christian members of the Orthodox Church and active figures in the movement, which they frequently wrote about in the magazine.

=== Opposition to Zionism ===
From the start, Al-Asma'i was opposed to and fearful of Zionism, and opposed Jewish immigration to Palestine from a perspective of local patriotism and Arab nationalism. Scholar Neville J. Mandel considered that this represented early anti-Zionist tendencies, writing that: "In so doing, they were in advance, sometimes very much in advance, of their readers."

The magazine frequently criticized the Zionist settlers and accused them of unfair competition with Arab craftsmen and traders, resenting the privileges they enjoyed from foreign powers, and considered them a threat to the local population. It cited how their foreign citizenships entailed them exemptions from certain taxes, and how their European skills and culture gave them other advantages. To oppose them, Al-Asma'i proposed various policies, including preference for buying locally produced goods, instead of "foreign", i.e. Jewish ones; and the promotion of industry and commerce by wealthy Arabs. In one article, the magazine lamented about the Jewish immigrants:

They harm the local population and wrong them, by relying on the special rights accorded to foreign powers in the Ottoman Empire and on the corruption and treachery of the local administration. Moreover, they are free from most of the taxes and heavy impositions on Ottoman subjects. Their labour competes with the local population and creates their own means of sustenance. The local population cannot stand up to their competition.

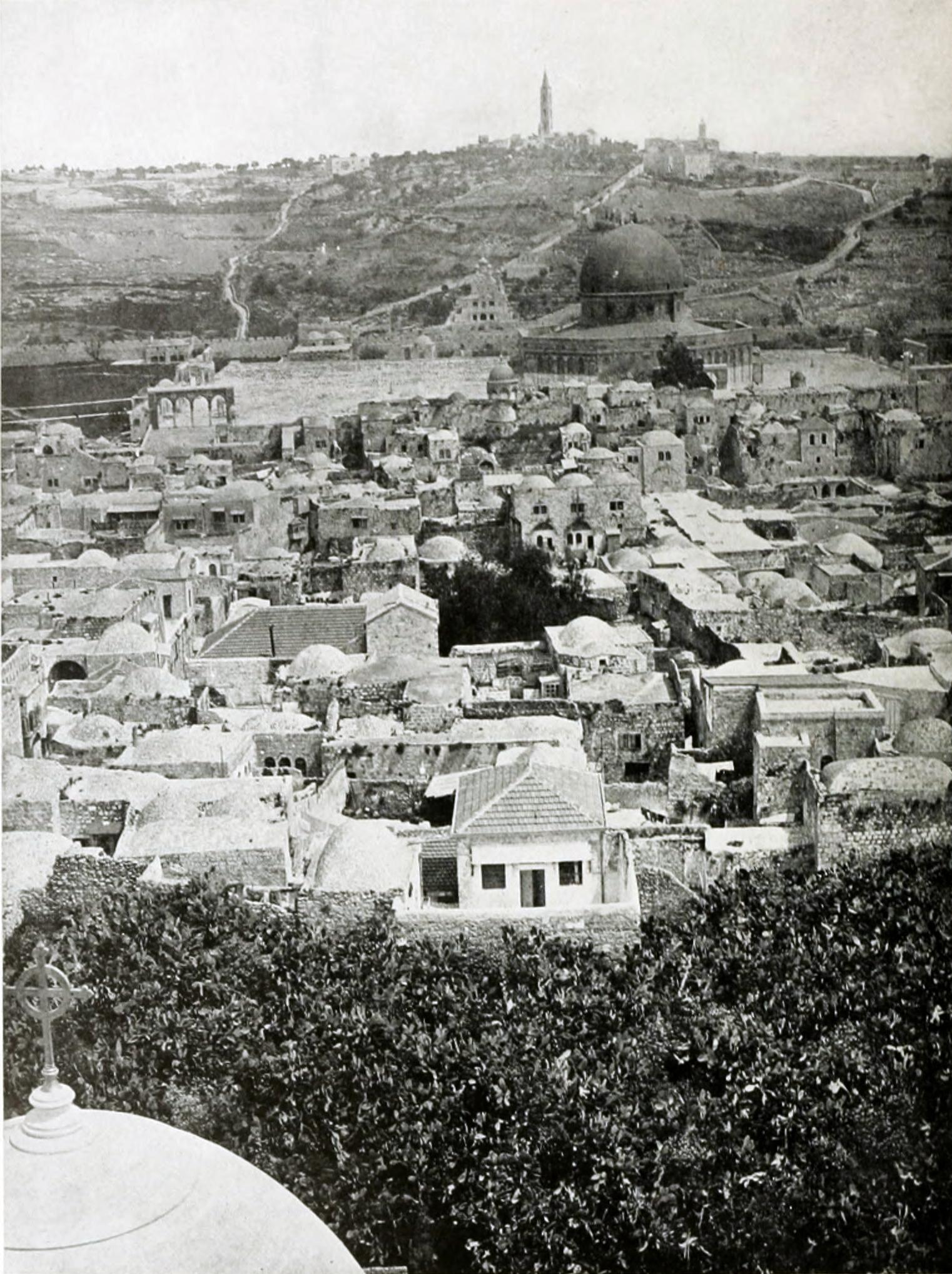
View of the Muslim Quarter of the Old City of Jerusalem where the magazine was printed and published, 1910

In another article in Al-Asma'i written by Arab Muslim writer Isaaf Nashashibi criticized the unwillingness and failure of the European Jewish immigrants to integrate in their new surroundings or to bother learning Arabic, which was a common theme in the Arab anti-Zionist press of the time. Nashashibi wrote that Jews "should help in reviving this [Arabic] language after its destruction," and urged that they “rid their hearts of those empty aspirations like the question of Zionism or governing Palestine,” arguing that there was no chance of reaching such hopes. “If the Jews want to live a good life with us, they should unite with us in respecting this beautiful language... They should imitate our brothers, the Christians, who are founding schools and teaching this beautiful language.”

Al-Asma'i's attacks on Zionism led to a number of complaints by Zionists to the district attorney, Yusuf Al-Hakim, representing the Ottoman Empire in Jaffa. The complaints were mainly initiated by Shimon Moyal and his wife Esther, Jews of Moroccan origin, as well as by Nissim Malul, a Jew of Tunisian origin.

=== Other topics ===
The magazine also was concerned with agricultural affairs, and the state of Arab fellahin (peasants), to which it recommended that the younger generation of Arabs learn and follow Jewish agricultural methods. This point was illustrated by a comparison between the lower standard of living in large Arab villages compared to the ones in smaller Jewish colonies. It promoted creating specialized banks providing financial loans for agricultural development. It was also concerned with women's issues, highlighting the importance of their education.

== Discontinuation ==
The magazine's last edition appeared on 1 February 1909, as its owner Hanna El-Issa was preoccupied with the Arab Orthodox Movement and was representing Jaffa as part of an Orthodox delegation sent to the Ottoman government in Istanbul to negotiate for the establishment of a mixed council in the Jerusalem Church that would represent the Palestinian Arab community in addition to the Greek clergy; and for the provision of thirty thousand Ottoman gold pounds annually by the church for educational and social projects. Having returned from Istanbul to undergo surgery, Hanna died shortly afterwards on 12 September 1909 in Jerusalem.

The provisions negotiated by the Orthodox delegation were not realized, which triggered a series of demonstrations and protests among the Arab laity demanding their implementation. It was at this point that Issa El-Issa left his job as a bank clerk and joined the movement against the Church by establishing the newspaper Falastin in 1911, following the advice of his late cousin Hanna who told him that establishing a new newspaper would help him reach out to a larger audience. Issa utilized contacts in Al-Asma'i to acquire writers for his new newspaper, which became one of the most influential Palestinian dailies.

== See also ==
- Media of the Ottoman Empire
- History of Palestinian journalism
- Falastin

== Bibliography ==
- Abdelal, Wael (1 March 2012). From the Mosque to Satellite Broadcasting: A Historical Perspective of Hamas Media Strategy (PhD in Politics thesis). University of Exeter.
- Ayalon, Ami (2010). Reading Palestine: Printing and Literacy, 1900-1948. University of Texas Press. doi:10.7560/705791. ISBN 978-0-292-79736-9. JSTOR 10.7560/705791.
- Ben-Bassat, Yuval (2011). Ben-Bassat, Yuval; Ginio, Eyal (eds.). Late Ottoman Palestine: The Period of Young Turk Rule. I.B. Tauris. doi:10.5040/9780755693047. ISBN 978-0-75569-304-7.
- Bracy, R. Michael (2011). Printing Class: 'Isa Al-'Isa, Filastin, and the Textual Construction of National Identity, 1911-1931. University Press of America. ISBN 978-0-7618-5375-6.
- Dowty, Alan (2019). Arabs and Jews in Ottoman Palestine: Two Worlds Collide. Indiana University Press. doi:10.2307/j.ctvbnm423. JSTOR j.ctvbnm423.
- Kabha, Mustafa (2007). The Palestinian Press as Shaper of Public Opinion 1929-39. Vallentine Mitchell. ISBN 978-0-85303-672-2.
- Khalaf, Noha (2009). Les Mémoires de 'Issa al-'Issa - Journaliste et intellectuel palestinien (1878-1950) (in French). KARTHALA Editions. ISBN 978-2-8111-3105-0.
- Mandel, Neville J. (1976). The Arabs and Zionism Before World War I. University of California Press. ISBN 978-0-520-02466-3.
- Morris, Benny (2011). Righteous Victims: A History of the Zionist-Arab Conflict, 1881-1998. Knopf Doubleday Publishing Group. ISBN 978-0-307-78805-4.
- Muslih, Muhammad Y. (1988). The Origins of Palestinian Nationalism. Columbia University Press. ISBN 978-0-231-06509-2.
- Tamari, Salim (2017). The Great War and the Remaking of Palestine. University of California Press. ISBN 9780520291263.
- Toksoz, Meltem (2014). Kolluoğlu, Biray; Toksöz, Meltem (eds.). Cities of the Mediterranean: From the Ottomans to the Present Day. Bloomsbury publishing. doi:10.5040/9780755619368. ISBN 978-1-8488-5127-6.
