= Issa (name) =

Issa (Arabic: عِيسَى) is a given name that means Jesus in Arabic. It may refer to:

- Christ in Islam
- El-Issa family

== Mononym ==
- Jane Siberry (born 1955), Canadian singer who released several albums under the name Issa
- Issa (Senegalese singer), Issa Diop, singer, songwriter, and record producer
- Issa, the nickname of Luttif Afif (died 1972), a leader of the Black September terror squad at the 1972 Olympic Games

== Given name ==
- Issa Amro (born 1980), Palestinian activist
- Issa Bagayogo (1961–2016), Malian musician
- Issa Batarseh, American electrical engineer
- Issa Boulos (born 1968), Palestinian-American oud player, composer, lyricist, researcher and educator
- Issa Cissokho (1946–2019), Senegalese musician of Malian griot roots, a composer, and saxophone player for Orchestra Baobab
- Issa Cissokho (footballer) (born 1985), Senegalese footballer
- Issa Diop (footballer) (born 1997), French footballer
- Issa El-Saieh (1919–2005), Haitian musician, composer, and businessman of Palestinian descent
- Issa Gold (born 1990), American rapper
- Issa Hayatou (1946–2024), Cameroonian athlete and sports executive
- Issa Hentona (辺土名 一茶; born 1978), lead singer of J-pop band Da Pump
- Issa Kallon (born 1996), Dutch footballer
- Issa Kassissieh (born 1964), Palestinian scholar and diplomat
- Issa Kobayashi (小林 一茶; 1763–1828), Japanese haiku poet
- Issa Al-Laith (born 1985), Yemeni vocalist and poet affiliated with the Houthi movement
- Issa Lish (born 1995), Mexican model
- Issa López (born 1971), Mexican writer and director
- Issa Michuzi (born 1980), Tanzanian photojournalist
- Issa Mohamed (swimmer) (born 1995), Kenyan swimmer
- Isa Ali Abdullah al Murbati (born 1965), Guantanamo Bay detainee
- Issa Ndoye (born 1985), Senegalese footballer
- Issa-Aimé Nthépé (born 1973), French sprinter
- Issa Pliyev (1903–1979), Soviet military commander, Army General, twice Hero of the Soviet Union
- Issa Pointer (born 1978), American singer and member of the vocal group The Pointer Sisters
- Issa Rae (born 1985), American actress
- Issa Rayyan (born 2000), American soccer player
- Issa Samb (1945–2017), aka Joe Ouakam, Senegalese painter, sculptor, performance artist, playwright and poet
- Issa Samba (born 1998), French footballer
- Issa Sarr (born 1986), Senegalese footballer
- Issa Schultz (born 1984), English Australian radio and television quiz personality
- Issa Sesay (born 1970), military leader in the Sierra Leone insurgency
- Issa G. Shivji (born 1946), Tanzanian author and academic
- Issa Tchiroma (born 1949), Cameroonian politician and minister
- Issa Thiaw (born 1992), Senegalese footballer
- Issa Timamy (born 1959), Kenyan politician
- Issa Twaimz (born 1995), American YouTuber and musician
- Issah Yakubu (born 1992), Ghanaian footballer
- Issa bin Zayed Al Nahyan (born 1971), UAE Sheikh and torturer

== Middle name ==
- Falaba Issa Traoré (1930–2003), Malian writer, comedian, playwright, and theatre and film director

== Surname ==
- Abdul Razzaq al-Issa (born 1949), Iraqi politician and minister
- Abeer Issa (born 1961), Jordanian actress
- Abraham Elias Issa (1905–1984), Jamaican businessman, entrepreneur and hotelier
- Aguila Saleh Issa (born 1944), Libyan jurist and politician, President of the Libyan House of Representatives
- Ahmed Issa (Egyptian politician), Egyptian economist and minister of Tourism and Antiquities
- Attah Issa (born 1961), Ghanaian politician
- Daniel Issa (born 1952), American politician
- Darrell Issa (born 1953), American politician and Californian Representative
- Dounia Issa (born 1981), French basketball coach and former player
- Farouk Abu Issa (1933–2020), Sudanese politician and minister
- Issa Abu Issa (born 1955), Qatari business magnate
- Issa El-Issa (1878–1950), Palestinian Christian poet and journalist
- Issa Issa (born 1984), or Issam Al-Edrissi, Lebanese footballer
- Issa Kassim Issa (1957–2021), Tanzanian politician
- Jabari Issa (born 1978), American football player
- Joseph John Issa (born 1965), known as Joe or Joey Issa, Jamaican businessman and philanthropist
- Leandro Issa (born 1983), Brazilian mixed martial artist
- Majida Issa (born 1981), Colombian actress and singer
- Marwan Issa (1965–2024), Palestinian militant and leader of Hamas' military wing, the Izz ad-Din al-Qassam Brigade
- Mohammed al-Hadi ben Issa or al-Hadi ben Issa (also nicknamed Sheikh al-Kamil; 1467–1526), Moroccan Wali and founder of the Triqa Issawiya, considered the patron-saint of the city of Meknes
- Mohsin Issa (born 1971), and Zuber Issa (born 1972), British billionaire businessmen, co-founders of Euro Garages
- Muhammad bin Abdul Karim Issa (born 1965), Saudi Arabian politician, Secretary General of the Muslim World League
- Naeem Issa (1933–2025), Egyptian actor
- Norman Issa (born 1967), Israeli Arab actor, active in cinema, theatre and television
- Pierre Issa (born 1975), South African footballer
- Raja El-Issa (1922–2008), Palestinian journalist
- Salomon Juan Marcos Issa (born 1948), Mexican politician
- Tariq Issa (born 1997), English footballer
- Tatiana Issa (born 1974), Brazilian director and producer
- Yousef El-Issa (1870–1948), Palestinian journalist

== Fictional characters ==
- Issa (イッサ), a character from Animal Yokochō
- Issa Kazuma (珂妻 一叉), a character from Dragon Eye
- Issa Kaburagi (鏑木 一差), a character from Yowamushi Pedal

== Other uses ==
- Issa, another name for the Native American Catawba people
- Tropical Storm Isa, name used for multiple tropical cyclones worldwide
