= El-Issa family =

Palestinian Christian family

El-Issa Family
- Current region: Jerusalem, Palestine
- Origin: Jaffa, Palestine
- Members: Issa El-Issa, Raja El-Issa, Yousef El-Issa, Daoud El-Issa and Georgette El-Issa

The El-Issa Family is a Palestinian Christian family that emerged from Jaffa, Palestine in the 20th century. The family is known for its "Intellect, politics and journalism ", its members Daoud El-Issa and his cousin Issa El-Issa were among the first who warned about the Zionist movement in Mandatory Palestine. They also have supported Palestinian nationalism through their family's numerous newspapers and journals, most notably Falastin which was established in 1909. Other examples include Al-Asma'i, Alif Bā’ and Al-Bilād.

== Notable members ==
- Issa El-Issa: the founder of Falastin in Jaffa, Palestine, in 1909
- Yousef El-Issa, Issa's cousin who also founded Falastin in 1909, he also established Alif Bā’ in Damascus, Syria
- Raja El-Issa: Issa's son, who took manager position of the newspaper after his father's death, he was also the first chairman of the Jordan Press Association in Amman, Jordan, in 1956
- Daoud El-Issa: Issa's nephew who also had the manager position of the newspaper, established Al-Bilād in Jerusalem in 1956 and became a member of Jordan Press Association in 1976
- Georgette El-Issa: Palestinian philanthropist and activist.

== See also ==
- Al-Asma'i magazine (1908-1909)
- Falastin newspaper (1911-1967)
- Alif Ba newspaper (1930-1958)
- Issa (name)
