= Daoud El-Issa =

Palestinian journalist (1903–1983)

- Born: 10 September 1903; Jaffa, Ottoman Empire
- Died: 22 October 1983 (aged 80); Amman, Jordan
- Occupation: Journalist

Daoud Bandaly El-Issa (Arabic: داود بندلي العيسى) was a Palestinian journalist. For a period of time he managed the newspaper Falastin, which was established by his uncle Issa El-Issa in 1911 and based in their hometown of Jaffa. Falastin became one of the most prominent and long-running newspapers in the country at the time, dedicated to Arab nationalism and the cause of the Arab Orthodox in their struggle with the Greek Orthodox Patriarchate in Jerusalem. It was passionately opposed to Zionism.

El-Issa established the first Arab Orthodox Club in Jaffa with some of his friends on 4 September 1924. The administration of this club was in the Shuhaibar Building, Butmeh Road. He then worked as the general manager of Falastin. He published the newspaper Al-Bilad on 23 September 1951. He was later appointed general manager of the Jordanian Ad-Dustour newspaper, of which he was a part owner. El-Issa became a member of Jordan Press Association in 1976.

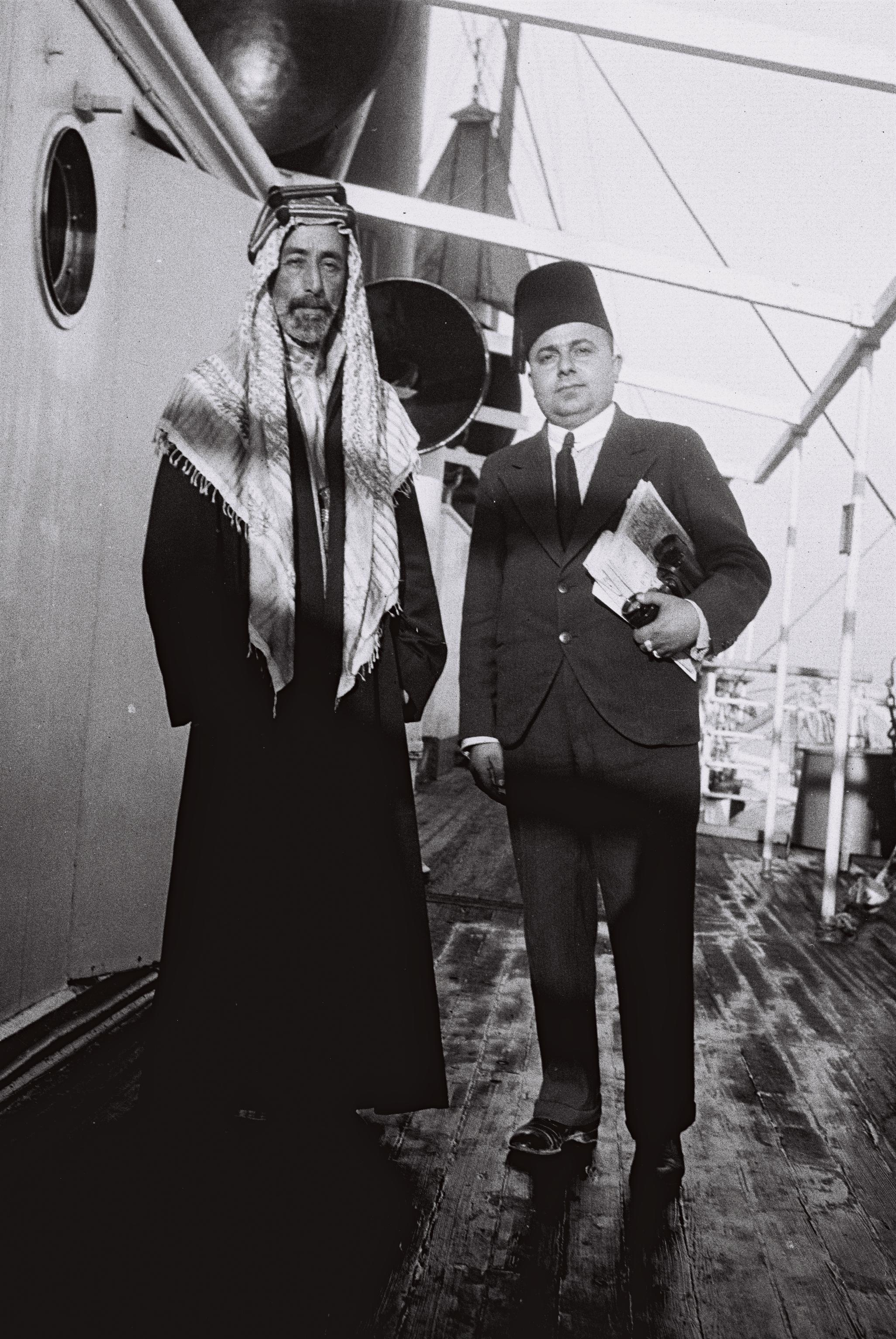
King Ali bin Hussein with Daoud El-Issa at the Jaffa port, sometime in 1933

== See also ==
- Falastin
- El-Issa family
