= Alif Ba =

Daily newspaper in Damascus (1930–1958)

- Type: Daily newspaper
- Founders: Yousef Al Issa; Issa Al Issa
- Editor-in-chief: Yousef Al Issa
- Founded: 13 March 1930
- Ceased publication: 1958
- Language: Arabic
- Headquarters: Damascus
- Country: Syria
- Sister newspapers: Falastin

Alif Ba, also spelled AlifBa and Alef Ba, (Arabic: ألف باء, lit. 'letters A B') was a daily newspaper published in Damascus between 1930 and 1958. The paper is known for its Palestinian founders Issa Al Issa and Yousef Al Issa who had cofounded the Falastin newspaper in Jaffa.

== History and profile ==
Alif Ba was started by the Palestinian journalists Issa Al Issa and Yousef Al Issa in Damascus in 1930, and its first issue appeared on 13 March that year. They established it when Falastin was banned in Jaffa. Over time Alif Ba became one of the most influential papers in Arab politics in the late 1930s.

Alif Ba came out daily. It had an anti–Zionist political stance and was a fierce critic of the British policy in the region. Issa Al Issa managed to return to Jaffa where he continued to publish Falastine. Yousef Al Issa stayed in Damascus and edited Alif Ba until his death in 1948. Then his two sons edited the paper until its closure in 1958.
