= Arab Orthodox Movement =

Issue in the Greek Orthodox Patriarchate of Jerusalem

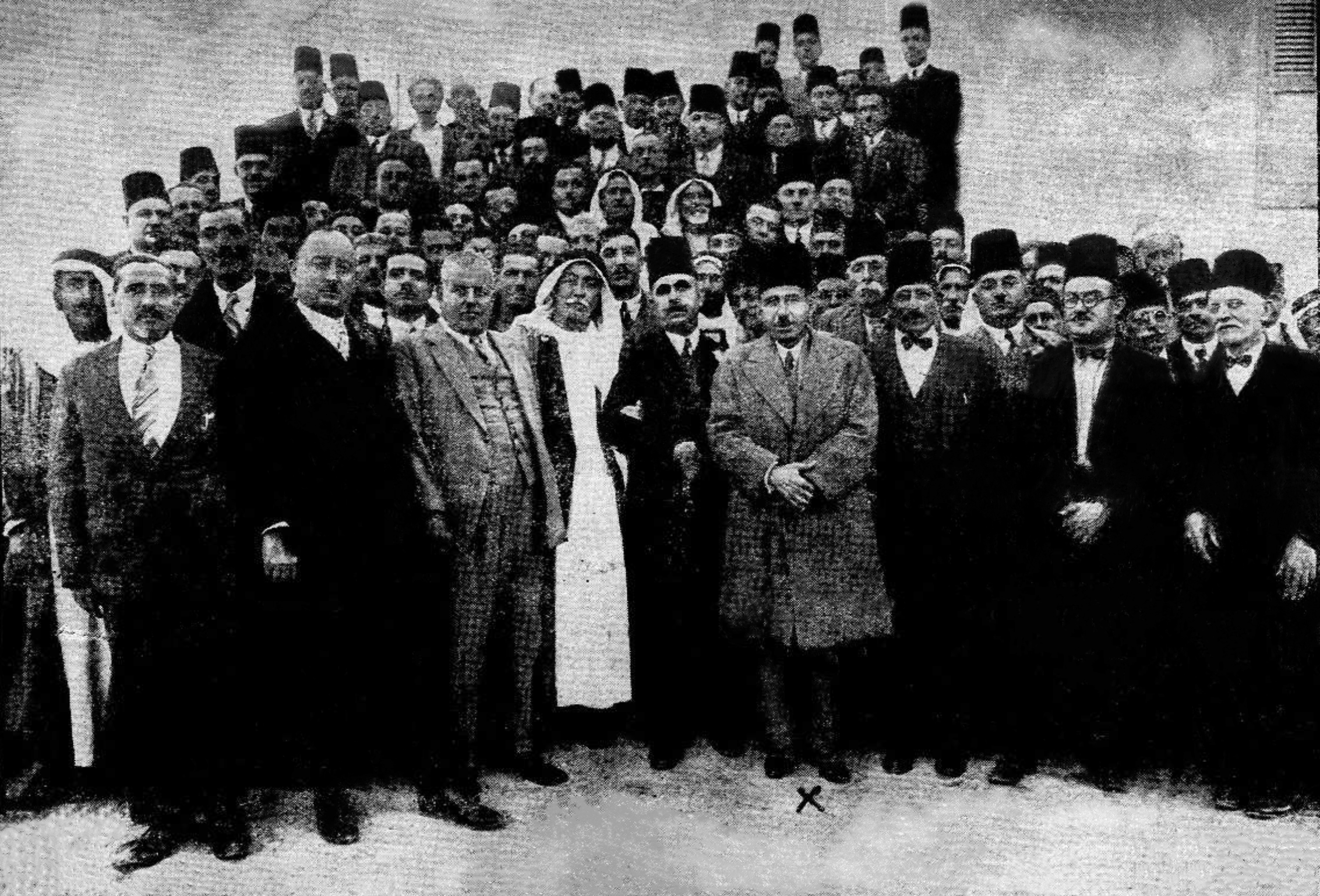
- The Second Arab Orthodox Conference held in Jaffa, Mandatory Palestine on 28 October 1931, with delegates from various Palestinian and Transjordanian cities.
- Native name: الحركة العربية الأرثوذكسية
- Date: 1860–present
- Location: Levant, (specifically: Israel/Palestine, Jordan, Egypt and Syria)
- Also known as: Orthodox Cause القضية الأرثوذكسية
- Cause: Ending the Greek domination of the Greek Orthodox Patriarchate of Jerusalem and Antiochian Orthodox Church
- Motive: Arab nationalism
- Outcome: Establishment of separate Arab Orthodox institutions Failure to end the Greek clerical hegemony in Greek Orthodox Patriarchate of Jerusalem

The Arab Orthodox Movement (Arabic: الحركة العربية الأرثوذكسية, romanized: Al-Haraka Al-ʿArabiyya Al-ʾUrthūdhuksiyya) is a political and social movement aiming for the Arabisation of the Greek Orthodox Patriarchate of Jerusalem and the Antiochian Orthodox Church, which has jurisdiction over the Orthodox communities of Israel/Palestine, Egypt, Jordan and Syria, to which most Christians in the region belong.

Within the context of rising Arab nationalism in the 19th century, the movement was inspired by the successful precedent of the Arabization of Syria and Lebanon's Antioch Patriarchate in 1899. The movement seeks the appointment of an Arab patriarch, Arab laity control over Jerusalem patriarchate's properties for social and educational purposes, and the use of Arabic as a liturgical language. Initially a church movement among Palestine and Transjordan's Orthodox Arab Christians in the late 19th century, it was later supported as a Palestinian and Arab nationalist cause and championed by some Arab Muslims, owing to the Greek-dominated patriarchate's early support to Zionism.

The Orthodox laity, which is mostly Arab, maintains that the patriarchate was forcibly Hellenized in 1537, while the Greek clergy says that the patriarchate was historically Greek. Opposition to the Greek clergy turned violent in the late 19th century, when they came under physical attack by the Arab laity in the streets. The movement held Arab Orthodox conferences, the first of which was in Jaffa in 1923, and most recently in Amman in 2014. One outcome of the 1923 conference was the laity's establishment of tens of Orthodox churches, clubs and schools in Palestine and Jordan. There were historically also several interventions to solve the conflict by the Ottoman, British (1920–1948), and Jordanian (1948–1967) authorities, owing to the patriarchate's headquarters being located in East Jerusalem. Despite the city coming under Israeli occupation since 1967, the patriarchate has continued to function according to a 1958 Jordanian law, which mandates the clergy hold Jordanian citizenship and speak Arabic.

To this day, the patriarchate continues to be dominated by Greek clergy and owns vast properties that make it the second largest landowner in Israel. In recent decades, lawsuits have ensued in Israeli courts between the Arab laity and the patriarchate over ownership of properties. Land sales by the patriarchate to Israeli investors has led to several controversies, the most recent of which led to the dismissal of patriarch Irenaios in 2005. The patriarch's total control over the patriarchate and its vast properties has led to it being described as resembling a "small absolute kingdom".

== Background ==
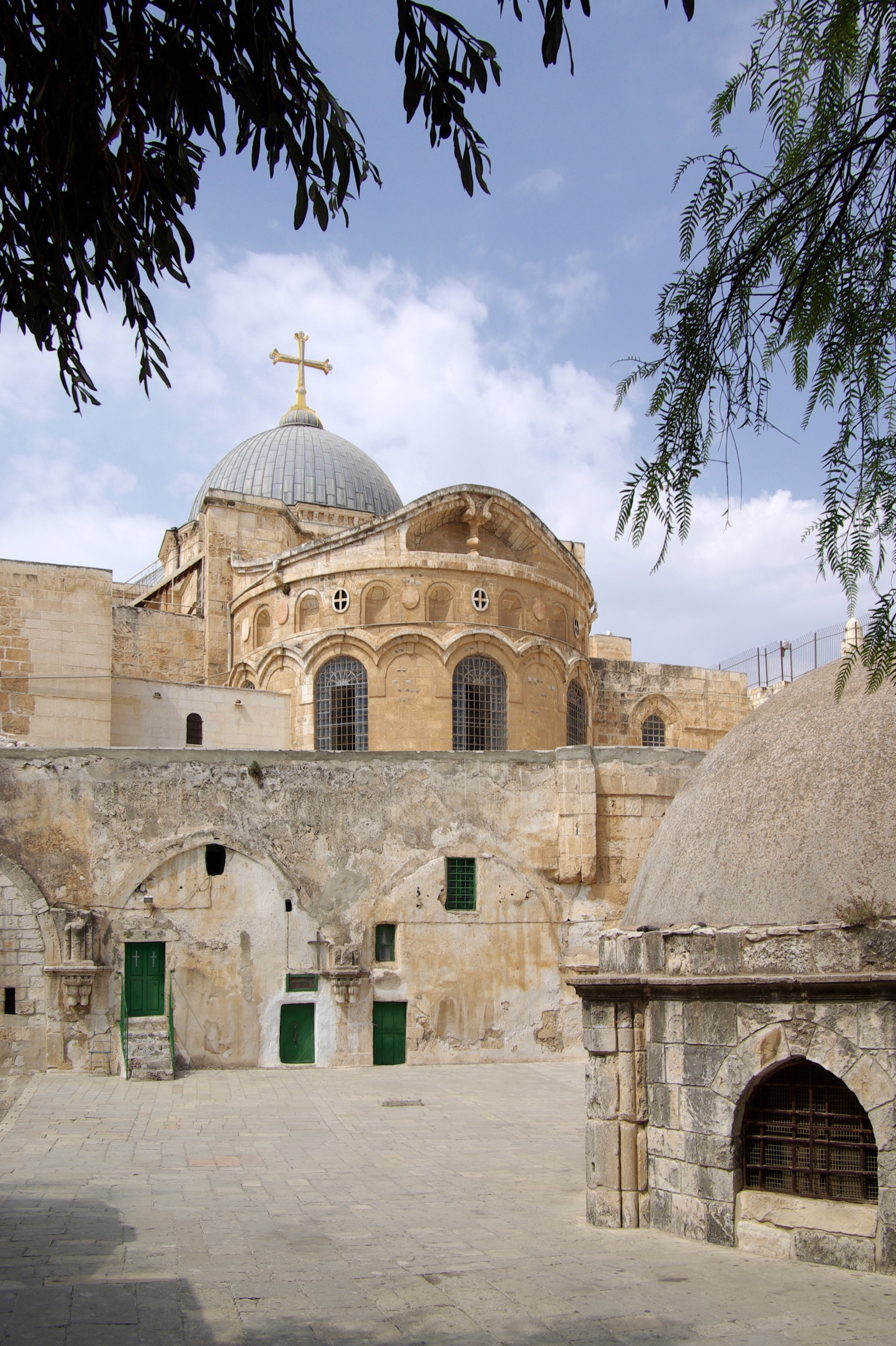
View of the Holy Sepulchre, East Jerusalem, where the patriarchate's headquarters are located

The Greek Orthodox Patriarchate of Jerusalem is regarded as Jerusalem's most prominent patriarchate, and Palestine's largest and oldest church. It was established by a decree issued from the Council of Chalcedon in 451 AD, which elevated the Bishop of Jerusalem to the rank of Patriarch, ranking fifth after the sees of Rome, Constantinople, Alexandria, and Antioch (known as the Pentarchy). The patriarchate's jurisdiction extends to the regions of Palestine, Transjordan and the Sinai Peninsula.

Succession to the position of patriarch has been dominated by Greeks since the resignation in 1537 of the last Arab Palestinian Patriarch, Dorotheus II, who was known as Atallah in Arabic. He was replaced by Germanus, a Greek from Morea who pretended to be an Arab through his thorough knowledge of Arabic. Germanus initiated a process of Hellenization, for example by removing the names of Arab patriarchs who had served prior, appointing Greeks to the higher ranks of church, and using Greek as a liturgical language. He also took steps to ensure that his successors would be Greeks by establishing the Brotherhood of the Holy Sepulchre, whose membership was exclusively Greek. Germanus and the Greek patriarchs who succeeded him handled the patriarchate from their residence in Constantinople until 1834. Election of successive Jerusalem patriarchs was approved by the Greek Patriarch of Constantinople, who benefitted from his proximity to and influence on the Ottoman government.

Arab Christians in the Palestine region amounted to around 10% of the population prior to World War I in 1914, the majority, around half, belonging to the Greek Orthodox Patriarchate. The patriarchate, dominated by Greek clergy, saw itself as the guardian of the holy places, and not the spiritual guide of its mostly Arab laity, who were barred from becoming monks and had no role in administrative or financial workings of the church.

== Movement ==
Within the context of rising Arab nationalism, Arab revolts against the Greek clergy in the Orthodox patriarchates of Antioch and Jerusalem — covering modern-day regions of Syria and Lebanon, and Palestine and Transjordan respectively — intensified in the late 19th century. These movements in Arab provinces of the Ottoman Empire gained inspiration from nationalists in fellow Balkan provinces (Serbian, Bulgarian, Macedonian, and Greek Orthodox), who merged demands for religious reforms and national emancipation within the Ottoman Empire earlier that century. Movements demanding the Arabization of the Orthodox patriarchates started in Syria and Lebanon in 1872, and was successful when Meletius II, Michael Doumani in Arabic, was appointed patriarch of Antioch in 1899, becoming its first Arab patriarch since 1720. Sati' al-Husri termed this as "the first real victory of Arab nationalism". However, Arabization of the Jerusalem Orthodox patriarchate failed in Palestine and Transjordan. Other patriarchates in the Holy Land underwent successful Arabization, including Catholic, Anglican and Lutheran churches.

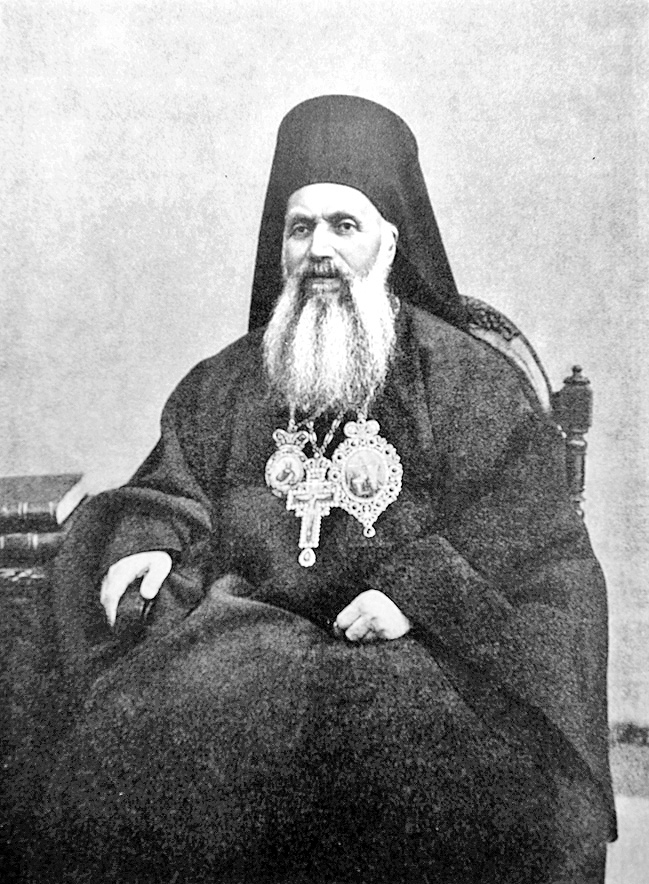
The appointment of Meletius II as patriarch of Antioch in 1899 was considered a successful Arabization that inspired the movement among laity of the Jerusalem Patriarchate

In the late 19th century, the Arab laity protested against the Jerusalem Patriarchate. The Ottomans responded to these protests by promulgating a Fundamental Law in 1875, that gave minor rights to the Arab laity but ensured Greek hegemony, partly influenced by Russian support to laity's demands. Following the restoration of the Ottoman Constitution by the 1908 Young Turk Revolution, a committee of 40 Orthodox Arabs met in Jerusalem and made a set of 18 demands; it was the first time that the right to participate in management of patriarchate's properties was raised. The demands were rejected by the patriarch Damianos, which was followed by violent riots by the Arab laity. Damianos was then deposed by the Greek-dominated brotherhood for appearing too accommodative towards Arab laity demands, but was later reinstated. In 1910, in an attempt to settle the problem, the Ottoman government set up a mixed council, consisting of six Arab and six Greek representatives; the patriarchate would also have to provide a third of its revenues towards financing schools, hospitals and charities. However, the Ottomans stopped short of allowing the Arab laity greater say in the election of their patriarch. These minor concessions were never implemented, and the Mixed Council, which the patriarch deemed having an advisory role, was soon after dissolved in 1913.

The 1914 World War I wreaked havoc on the patriarchate's finances. By the end of 1918, it was estimated that the patriarchate was 600,000 pounds in debt. The Ottomans were driven out of Palestine by British forces commanded by General Edmund Allenby, who drew a temporary reconciliation between the Arab laity and the patriarchate. Tensions arose again when the brotherhood attempted to solve the church's financial problems by taking a loan from Greece, subjecting the church to Greek government influence, and affirming the Hellenic identity of the church. These demands were opposed by Damianos and the British authorities. The Haycraft Commission established by the British in 1921, included recommendations to put control of the church's finances under a British-appointed committee, and greater British involvement in the patriarch's appointment; two policies that were consistent with "maintenance of religious institutions in colonial contexts". The commission also stressed that the laity's problem was bound to reappear and expressed sympathy for Arab demands of greater participation in the church.

In the early 1920s, tensions between the Arab laity and the Greek church worsened significantly after it had issued statements supporting Zionism, and after the British-Greek commission handling the church's finances sold large tracts of land in Jerusalem and its surroundings in 1923, to the Palestine Land Development Company owned by Zionists, aiming to increase Jewish colonization. The Arab Orthodox laity began afterwards of portraying their Greek church a foreign oppressor, akin to the imperial British authorities, and the Zionist immigrants. The Arab Orthodox movement then started using nationalist and anti-imperialist language in its struggle against the patriarchate.

=== First Arab Orthodox Conference ===
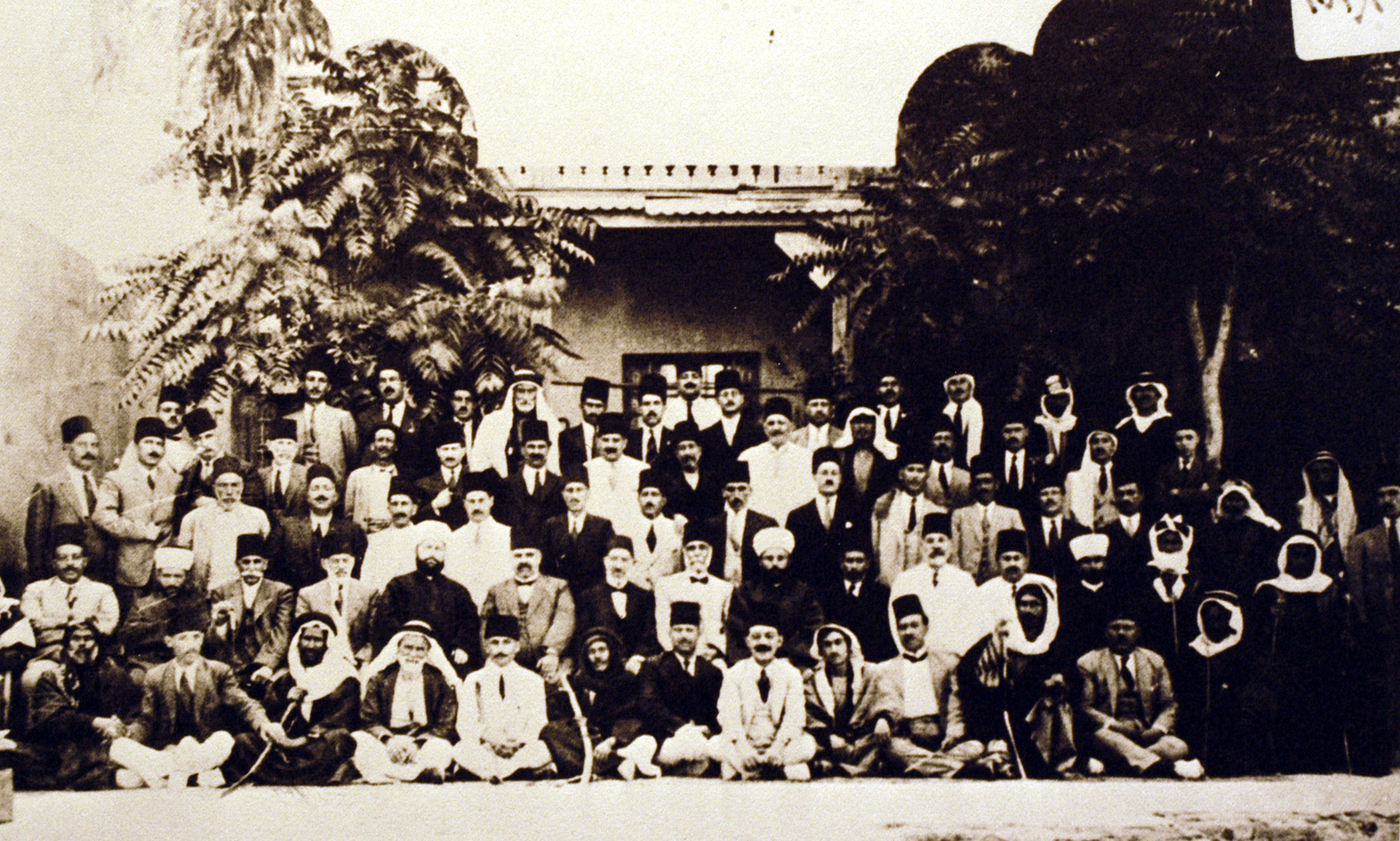
Sixth meeting of the Palestine Arab Congress passed a resolution supporting the Arab Orthodox Movement and recognized it in broader nationalist terms, Jaffa, Mandatory Palestine, 16 June 1923

During the sixth conference of the Palestine Arab Congress that was held in Jaffa, Mandatory Palestine, in June 1923, Arab Orthodox leaders, including activists Yacoub Bordqosh and Ibrahim Shammas, and editors Issa El-Issa of the Falastin newspaper, and Issa Bandak of the Sawt Sha'ab magazine, petitioned the Congress to support the Arab Orthodox movement and recognize it as part of a broader nationalist struggle. Encouraged by the Congress' support, they went on to establish an Arab Orthodox Conference in Haifa on 15 July 1923.

The first Arab Orthodox Conference was led by Iskandar Kassab as president, Yaqoub Farraj as deputy president (who would in the following decade become the movement's most committed leader), Michael Khoury as secretary. It was attended by 54 delegates representing all the dioceses in Palestine and Transjordan, demanded Arabization and denounced the Greek hegemony, who were "foreign of language and country... and have four centuries ago usurped the spiritual authority from the Arab Orthodox." The conference demanded renaming the church to the Jerusalem Orthodox Patriarchate; allowing Arab members into brotherhood and hierarchy; enabling Arab administrative participation in financial affairs; Arab control of church institutions; formation of a Mixed Council of an Arab majority with widespread authorities; and insistence on Arabic as liturgical language. The conference also castigated the patriarchate for its land sales to Zionists individuals and companies.

Patriarch Damianos responded to the first Arab Orthodox Conference by organizing his own opposing party, which met several time in October 1923, and proposed less radical reforms to the British. Despite recognizing that the first Arab Orthodox Congress was representative of the community, the British did not respond to its demands. In 1929, a series of letters from Orthodox clubs and association across Mandatory Palestine wrote to the British authorities, denouncing the Greek clergy and accusing them of continued Hellenization, greed and theft.

In 1926, a British commission to "report on certain controversies", also known as the Bertram-Young commission, expressed sympathy with Arab Orthodox demands. It noted that a large part of the Arab Orthodox hostility was due to scandals by the Greek monks involving money and women. However, despite supporting greater Arab participation in the patriarchate's affairs, it stopped short of demanding its Arabization. Significantly, the report's proposed reforms were delayed until a new patriarch was to be elected, which hindered the movement. The British were keen on avoiding the empowerment of Palestinian Orthodox Christians, as they were, along with their Palestinian Muslim counterparts, hostile to Zionism and the British mandate. The report stated: "It is impossible not to view with feelings of sympathy the position in which these members of the Church find themselves." The British report continued:

Like all young men of their time, they are full of the idea of nationalism, and cherish the language which united them with their fellow countrymen. They do not wish to abandon their Church; on the contrary, they are attached to its traditions and its rites. But they find themselves, owing to a peculiar historical development, subject to a monastery whose greatest pride is that it is composed of members of a race alien (or which they themselves consider alien) to their own.

=== Second Arab Orthodox Conference ===
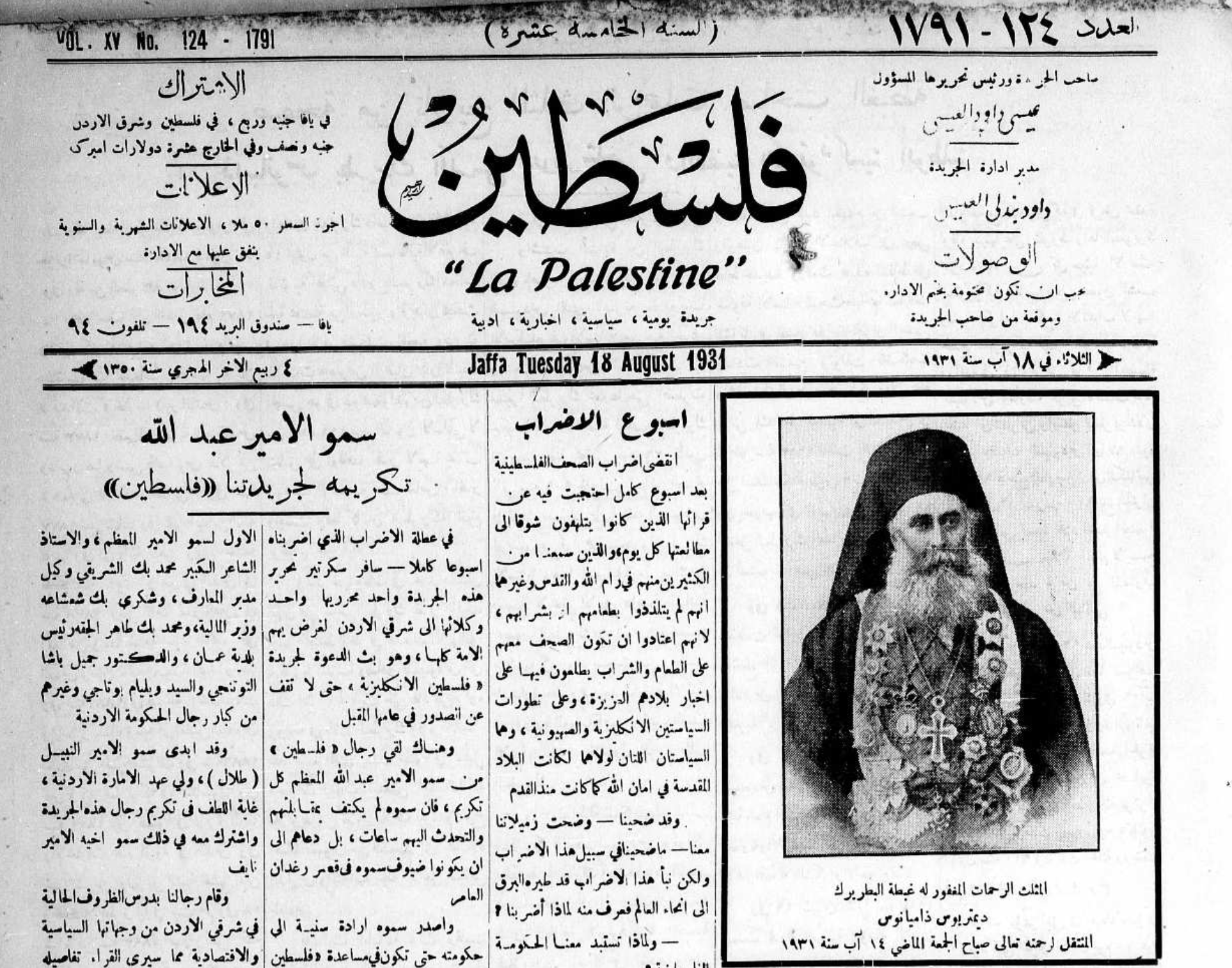
Falastin newspaper front-page headline reporting on Patriarch Damianos' death, 18 August 1931

In 1931, Patriarch Damianos died, and the laity quickly moved to renew their claims, by highlighting how the 1926 British commission sympathized with their stance; how Antioch Patriarchate had been inclusive of its Arab clergy and laity; and how the Jerusalem Patriarchate should be Palestinian and not Greek. They regarded the Greek claim of ownership of holy sites as "groundless and arrogant". They added: "The Patriarchate is an Orthodox institution in Palestine. The Patriarch and the Fraternity are Palestinians. The Community is Palestinian and the Shrines are in Palestine". A meeting was held in Jerusalem attended by 400 notables, Arab priests and the Orthodox community, that refused to recognize any patriarch elected without community's consent.

On 28 November 1931, the second Arab Orthodox Conference was held in Jaffa, led by Issa El-Issa. The concurrent World Islamic Congress held in Jerusalem passed a resolution supporting the Arab Orthodox Movement and recognized it as part of a wider Arab nationalist struggle. The Patriarchate brotherhood moved quickly to preempt these moves, and nominated three candidates for the patriarch's position. The election was allowed to proceed by British High Commissioner Sir Arthur Wauchope, despite Arab laity protests, who demanded their right to elect the patriarch according to constitutional terms and in accordance with the situation in the Antioch patriarchate.

The Arab community sought the opinion of the Palestine Mandate's High Court, and succeeded in getting a supportive ruling, which criticized the mandate authorities for its treatment of the laity, the ignoring of the 1926 British commission's recommendations, and accused the high commissioner of misconceiving his powers by allowing the patriarch's election to proceed. The Falastin newspaper celebrated the ruling, and the Executive Orthodox Committee met with the high commissioner to present its stances. Wachoupe was irritated by the court's ruling, but in 1934, issued as statement saying that no patriarch election would be confirmed without heeding to the demands of the laity, and approved a draft bill of a new law to replace the 1875 Ottoman Fundamental Law concerning Patriarchate. The bill was criticized by the laity. Palestinian journalist Yousef El-Issa and Transjordanian civil servant Auda Qusus wrote in the Executive Committee's memo:

We must in conclusion admit that the problem shall surely be trusted to the Government and that the Patriarchate and the Community shall have to enjoy what the two cats enjoyed of the piece of cheese on which they disputed one another.

The conference sent a letter to Emir Abdullah of Transjordan asking for his support, to which he responded positively, especially with regards to the election of an Arab patriarch. At George Antonius' suggestion, Wachoupe met with the patriarch-elect Timotheus and his chief secretary, and found both of them to be fully opposed to any laity rights. Commissioner Wachoupe wrote:

At the end of 2 hours, I rose in my chair and in my wrath said I was profoundly disappointed and dismayed at the regrettable lack he had shown of any approach to a spirit of good will or conciliation. I said I should not forget his statement that the Convent had the power and would part with none of it to the laity.

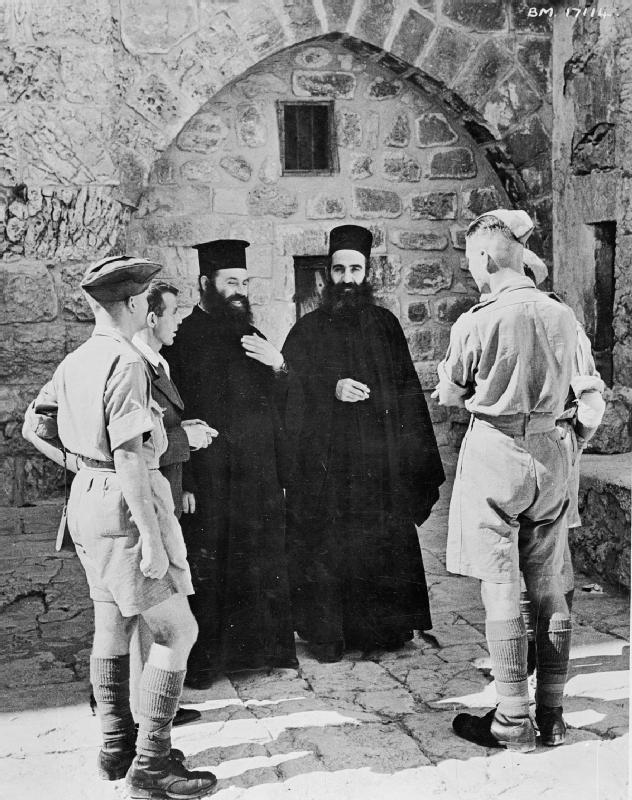
British troops talk to Orthodox Greek priests outside the Church of the Holy Sepulchre in Jerusalem, 11 August 1942.

Despite Commissioner Wachoupe's attempts, no further action was taken by the Mandate authorities to prevent Timotheus' election. A further lawsuit by the Arab Orthodox community failed to stop his election. A year after the Arab revolt in Palestine against British mandate authorities in 1937, Yacoub Farraj wrote to the British Peel Commission presenting the Arab Orthodox community's position.

The Arab Orthodox Movement however faced internal criticism from George Antonius and Khalil Sakakini, with the former viewing incorporation of Palestinian Arab nationalism into the movement was counterproductive, while the latter emphasized that communal political identifications were counterproductive to the integration of Christians into Palestinian political life. While the Arab Orthodox Movement leaders, Yacoub Farraj, Issa El-Issa and Issa Bandak, continued to view the communal and national identities as intertwined.

The movement was frustrated and lost momentum when the Patriarch's election, Timotheus, was confirmed in 1939; and it was overshadowed by growing Arab-Jewish hostilities. The Arab Orthodox community was suffering from difficulties as many of the laity began to leave the church

=== Third Arab Orthodox Conference ===
On 23 and 24 September 1944, the third Arab Orthodox Conference was held, attended by Palestinian and Transjordanian Orthodox members. Issa Bandak headed the executive committee, who wrote to the British regarding their demands. Becoming disillusioned with the Mandate authorities, the Arab Orthodox community turned their attention to the newly formed Arab League in 1946, and presented their cause in Arab nationalist terms:

We as Arabs and our case being both nationally and politically an Arab affair present this humble petition requesting from your honourable League and from the Arab States participating in the League sympathy for our case by embracing it as an indivisible part of the general Palestinian case.

=== 1958 Jordanian law ===
Following the 1948 Arab-Israeli War, known to Palestinians as the Nakba (catastrophe), the Arab Orthodox community focused its efforts on refugee relief. The patriarchate lent lands for the construction of churches, in an effort to ease tensions with the congregation. However, it was reported that tenants faced harassment and high rents by rent collectors affiliated with the patriarchate. The patriarchate had become in the wake of the war in East Jerusalem, under the control of Jordan, along with the West Bank. When Patriarch Timotheus died in 1955, the congregation renewed its demands, which led to the intervention of the Jordanian government. The Arab nationalist government of Suleiman Nabulsi was supportive of the patriarchate's Arabization, and drafted a new law that met most of the congregation's demands in 1956. However, after his government's forced resignation in April 1957, and due to objections by Patriarch Benedictus, a compromise was reached in 1958 that responded to the Arab Orthodox laity's demands, without giving the right to manage the patriarchate's properties. It demanded the adoption of Jordanian citizenship by all members of the brotherhood and the use of Arabic language among the Greek clergy. This law is in force today, regulating the patriarchate's functions.

=== 1980s and 1990s activism ===
In the wake of the 1967 Six Day War, the West Bank was occupied by Israel. A series of demonstrations erupted by the Arab Orthodox laity against the patriarchate in Bethlehem, Jaffa and Nazareth in the 1990s, demanding control over the patriarchate's properties. Four conferences were held in Jerusalem in 1992, Amman in 1994, Nazareth in 1999, and Amman in 2002.

In the 1980s and 1990s, the struggle between the Arab Orthodox laity and their patriarchate focused on lawsuits in Israeli courts, where both sides engaged in attempts to change ownership of some properties in their favor. Israel has maintained good relations with the patriarchate, in an effort to solidify its hold on occupied East Jerusalem, and in exchange for unfreezing some of the patriarchate's properties.

=== 2005 Irenaios dismissal ===
In early 2005, almost four years into his term as patriarch, Irenaios was dismissed from his position after being accused of selling three properties of the Greek Church in the Old City of Jerusalem to Ateret Cohanim, a Jewish organization whose declared aim is that of establishing a Jewish majority in Jerusalem's Old City and in East Jerusalem's Arab neighborhoods.

== Arab Orthodox Conferences ==
- The First Arab Orthodox conference in Haifa on July 15, 1923
- The Second Arab Orthodox conference in Jaffa on October 28, 1931
- The Third Arab Orthodox conference in Jerusalem on September 23 and 24,1944
- The Fourth Arab Orthodox conference in Jerusalem on March 23, 1956
- The Fifth Arab Orthodox conference in Amman on December 8, 1992
- The Sixth Arab Orthodox Conference in Amman in 1994
- The Seventh Arab Orthodox Conference in Nazareth in 1999
- The Eighth Arab Orthodox Conference in Amman in 2002
- The Ninth Arab Orthodox Conference in Amman on 14 October 2014

== Journalistic activism ==
If Palestine has a right to say that it has fallen under two mandatories, a British one and a Zionist one, the Orthodox community has the right to say that it has fallen under three mandatories, a British one, a Zionist one, and yet a third Greek one. These three mandatories have combined to aid one another in depriving Palestinian Arabs of their rights.

— Issa El-Issa, founder and editor of the Falastin newspaper in October 1931.

The Young Turk Revolution that restored the Ottoman Constitution in 1908, led to the abolishment of press censorship. Several newspapers, magazines and periodical appeared across Ottoman Palestine. Out of the twenty-five Palestinian newspapers that were launched in 1908, nineteen were Christian-owned. Palestinian Christian journalists dedicated a significant amount of space for the Orthodox cause. For example, Najib Nassar's Al-Karmil newspaper in 1908, Khalil Sakakini's Al-Dustour in 1910, and Bulus Shihadeh's Mir'at al-Sharq in 1919. The lead organ of the Orthodox movement, however, was the Falastin newspaper that was established by Issa El-Issa and Yousef El-Issa in 1911.

The central motive behind the founding of the Falastin newspaper was to serve as an outlet for the Arab Orthodox community in their struggle against the Greek clerical hegemony of the Patriarchate, but soon after picked up the Arab fight against the Zionist colonization of Palestine. When it first appeared in 1911, Falastin featured a column dedicated to Orthodox affairs. And after being republished in 1921, Falastin's editorials featured three main messages: Arab Orthodox dedication to their church; Greek clerical greed, immorality and foreignness; and inadequate British response to the issue. By the 1920s, the newspaper's editor Issa El-Issa began to view the Arab Orthodox movement, the Arab opposition to Zionist colonization of Palestine, and Arab opposition to the British Mandate authorities, as intertwined struggles in the national liberation movement against European imperial domination of Palestine.

== National Orthodox institutions ==
During the first Arab Orthodox Conference in July 1923, the attendees demanded "the establishment of new societies and clubs throughout Palestine and Transjordan" to solidify Arab leadership in the Orthodox community. In 1924, the first Orthodox Club was founded in Jaffa, followed by clubs in Jerusalem (1926), Acre (1929), Beit Sahour (1930), Lydda (1932) and Haifa (1937).

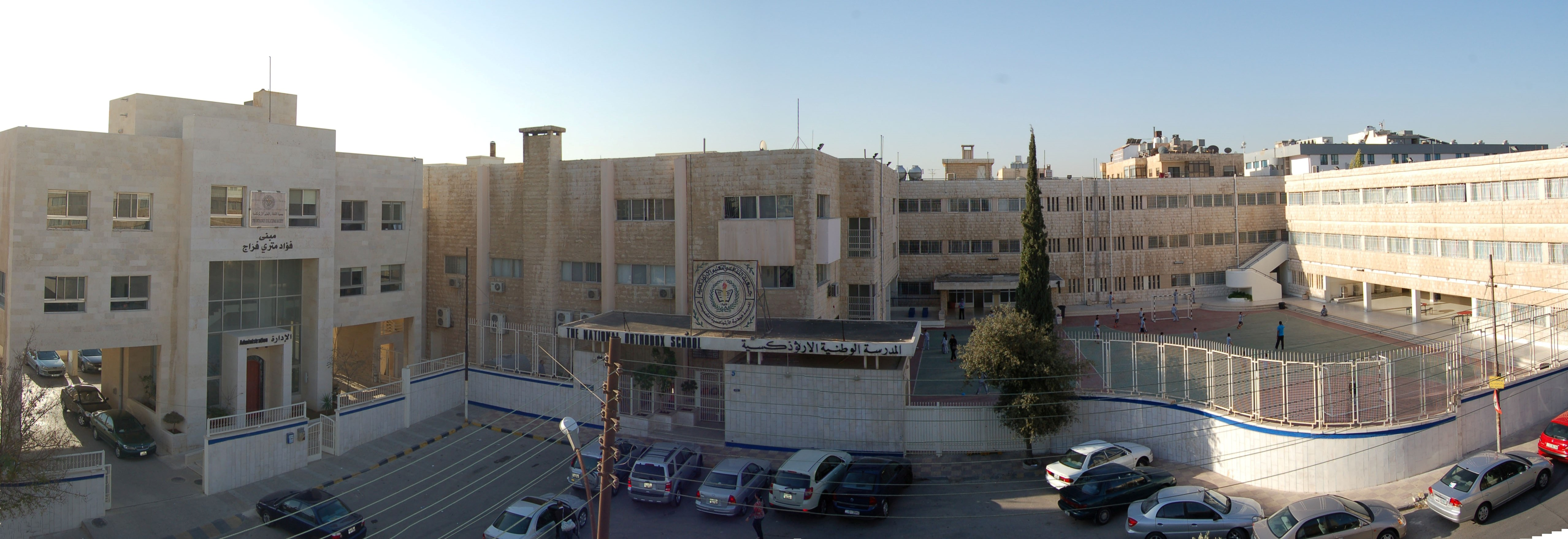
The National Orthodox School established in Amman in 1965, one of the largest national Orthodox institutions hosting thousands of students

Transjordanian notables established the Arab Orthodox Renaissance Association on 14 November 1928, presided by Auda Qusus and his deputy Amin Kawar. Qusus' first preoccupations was the establishment of an Orthodox school in Amman, which was constructed in 1930s hosting 50 students. In 1932, the Association decided to build a church in Amman, funded by philanthropists from the laity across Transjordan and Palestine. The construction work only started in 1947, mainly thanks to a donation from Jerusalem's Orthodox Monastery. The association also acquired two more lands, for cultural and social activities. It helped shape intellectual life in Transjordan and organized Arab nationalist debates against Zionism and later communism.

After unsuccessful attempts to register Orthodox schools in the 1950s, the Orthodox Educational Society was established in 1958, presided by Fu'ad Yaghnam, and later businessman and politician Fouad Farraj. The Society then quickly established its first school that year in Amman's Jabal Ashrafiah, the National Orthodox School, which later opened a second branch in Shmesani in 1965, hosting thousands of students.

== Land sale controversies ==
The Greek Orthodox Patriarchate of Jerusalem represents one of the largest landowners in the region known as the Holy Land. It is the second largest landowner in Israel after the Israel Land Department. Starting from the 19th century onwards, the patriarchate engaged in extensive land purchases, planned for church buildings, institutions, and businesses. It bought lands in what is today the Palestinian territories, Israel, Jordan and Egypt's Sinai Peninsula, places within its jurisdiction, and some even outside of it, including in Greece, Cyprus, Turkey, the United States, and Eastern Europe. These properties included hundreds of buildings, churches, and educational and welfare organizations. They are exclusively controlled by the Greek patriarch, including those registered in his name, in the patriarchate's name, and in the congregation's name. Thus, the patriarchate has come to be described as resembling a "small absolute kingdom".

== Historiography ==
Palestinian sociologist Salim Tamari wrote about the Arab Orthodox Movement:

The Orthodox Renaissance movement, it should be remembered, became a cause célèbre within wide circles of the Muslim intelligentsia in Syria and Palestine. Many believed that it was an essential component for the development of Arab nationalist currents in the late nineteenth century. Sati' al-Husri, the early ideologue of Arab nationalism, believed that the Arabization of the Orthodox Church of Antioch was a critical landmark and historical turning point for the triumph of Arabism in Syria. Within the various currents of Arab cultural movements in Greater Syria, Orthodox Christian intellectuals often maintained stronger affinities with their Muslim compatriots than did their Catholic and Protestant compatriots.

== See also ==
- Arab Christians
- Palestinian Christians
- Antiochian Greek Christians
- Lebanese Greek Orthodox Christians

== Bibliography ==
- Robson, Laura (2011). Colonialism and Christianity in Mandate Palestine. University of Texas Press. doi:10.7560/726536. ISBN 978-0-292-72653-6.
