= Georgette Rizek =

Palestinian activist (1925–2018)

Georgette Rizek (Arabic: جورجيت رزق; November 27, 1925 – March 16, 2018) was a Palestinian philanthropist and activist from Jerusalem. She founded the Infant Welfare Center in the Old City of Jerusalem.

== Biography ==
Georgette Rizek was born in Tulkarm on November 27, 1925 as Georgette Youssef al-Issa. Her mother, Alexandra Sahhar, was a nurse from Jerusalem. Her father, Yousef Elissa, was a pharmacist from Jaffa. She attended the Ramallah Friends Schools and worked as a secretary after graduation.

Georgette Rizek married Dimitri Rizek, who was originally from Jaffa, on August 17, 1947; they had four children. They lived in Jaffa, then fled to Jerusalem during the Nakba in 1948. Rizek, seeing the great number of Palestinian refugees in Jerusalem, decided to start a medical center to meet their healthcare needs. She founded the Greek Catholic Society's Infant Welfare Center, which was originally housed in the basement of a Greek Catholic church near Jaffa Gate in the Old City of Jerusalem. She served as its director until her retirement.

Rizek raised funds for the health center, both on her own and with the help of women from her church. In 1950, she and other women in her church founded a charitable group that raised funds through dinners, bazaars, and calendar sales. She also convinced local doctors to volunteer at the center. Eventually, Rizek raised enough money through her organization to pay the doctors a salary.

Rizek was a member of many political organizations, including the Arab Women's Association of Palestine. She was a Palestinian nationalist who protested Israeli settlement in lands where Palestinians lived. She was also prominent in Christian charitable societies such as the Jerusalem YWCA, Caritas Jerusalem, and the Arab Orthodox Society. Her primary interest was in providing medical care for those who could not afford it. The people Rizek served gave her the nickname "Umm Johnny," or "Mother of Johnny." She continued to volunteer and work with the community until she retired in 2008 at the age of 81.

Rizek developed renal failure in 2000. She died on March 16, 2018.

The medical center Rizek founded provides immunizations, medical care, and dental care, as well as literacy classes, food for children, health lessons, and first aid classes. The Infant Welfare Center primarily provides care for Palestinian women and their children who cannot afford health insurance. It serves over 6,000 a year.
