= Falastin =

Palestinian newspaper (1911–1967)

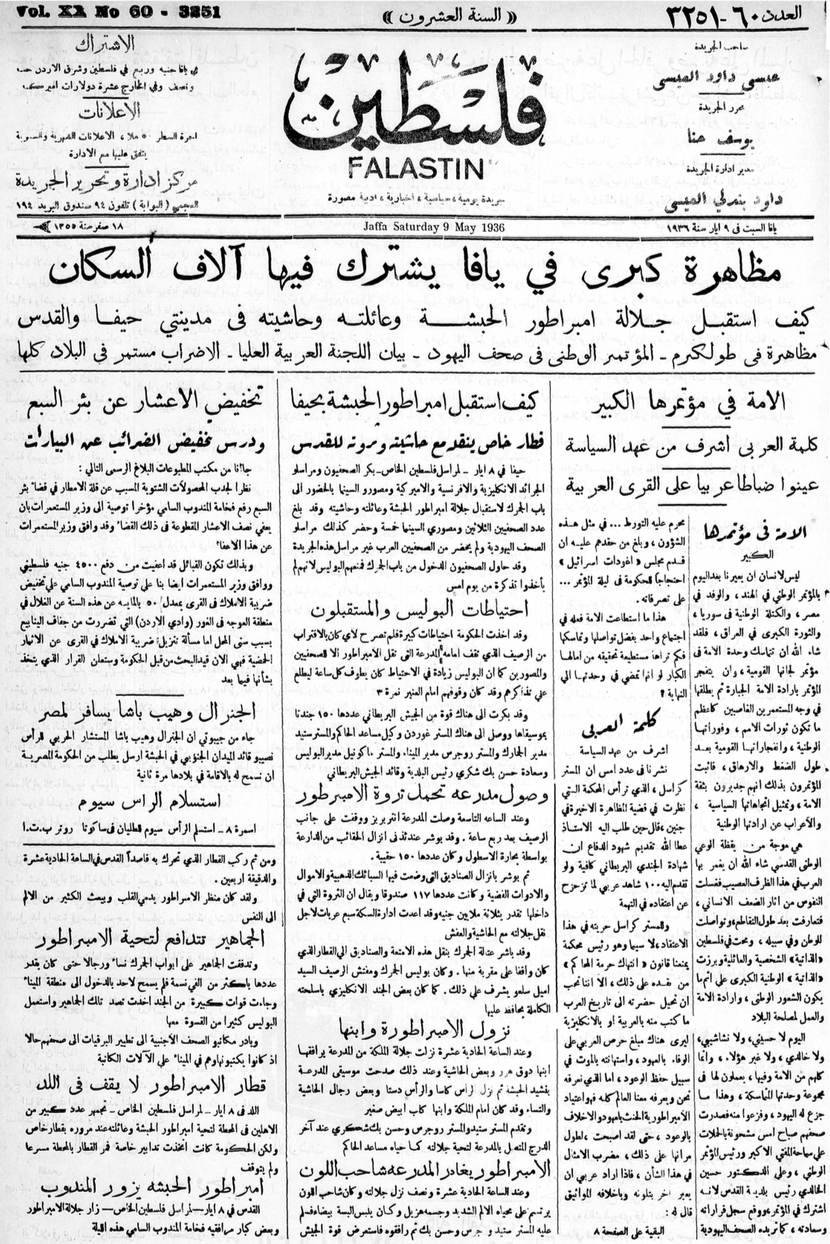
- 9 May 1936 cover of Falastin, with the headline story reporting on the Arab revolt in Palestine
- Type: Daily newspaper
- Format: Broadsheet
- Founder: Issa El-Issa
- President: Daoud El-Issa
- Editor: Yousef El-Issa; Raja El-Issa; Yousef Hanna
- Founded: 15 January 1911
- Ceased publication: 8 February 1967
- Political alignment: Anti-Zionism; Palestinian nationalism
- Language: Arabic; English
- City: Jaffa; East Jerusalem
- Country: Ottoman Empire; Mandatory Palestine; Jordanian West Bank
- Circulation: 3,000 (as of 1929)
- Free online archives: https://www.nli.org.il/en/newspapers/falastin

Falastin (فلسطين; Arabic for 'Palestine') was an Arabic-language Palestinian newspaper. Founded in 1911 in Jaffa, Falastin began as a weekly publication, evolving into one of the most influential dailies in Ottoman and Mandatory Palestine.

Falastin was founded by Issa El-Issa, who was joined by his paternal cousin Yousef El-Issa. Both El-Issas were Arab Christians, opponents of Zionism and of British administration. The newspaper was initially focused on the Arab struggle against Greek clerical hegemony of the Jerusalem Orthodox Church, known as the Arab Orthodox Movement, which Falastin's founders led. It was also the country's fiercest and most consistent critic of Zionism, denouncing it as a threat to Palestine's Arab population. The newspaper, which addressed its readers as Palestinians since its inception, helped shape Palestinian identity and was shut down several times by the Ottoman and British authorities, most of the time due to complaints made by Zionists.

As Palestine's most prominent newspaper, its circulation was estimated to be 3,000 in 1929 (the year it became a daily). Although a modest figure, it was almost double that of its nearest competitor. However, the standing of Falastin was challenged in 1934 by the Jaffa-based Al Difa' newspaper, which soon surpassed it in circulation. Both dailies witnessed steady improvements, and their competition marked Palestinian public life until 1948.

Falastin, forced to leave Jaffa during the 1948 Arab–Israeli War, relocated to East Jerusalem in the West Bank which then came under Jordanian control. The newspaper continued to be published until 1967, when it was merged with Al-Manar to produce Jordanian-based Ad-Dustour newspaper.

== History ==
=== Background ===
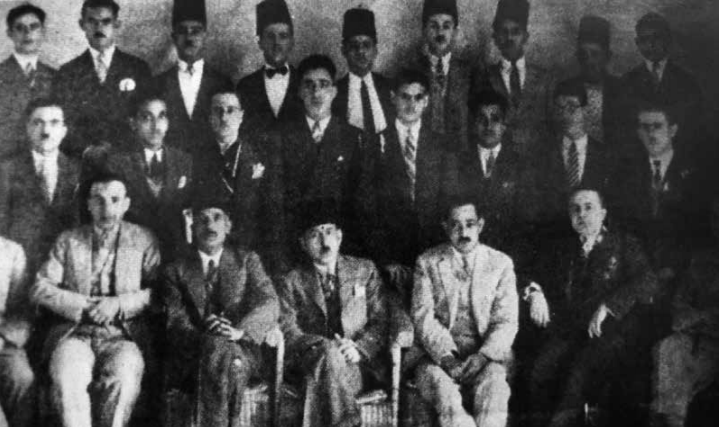
Editors and journalists of Falastin, 1913. Founders Issa and Yousef sit in the front row.

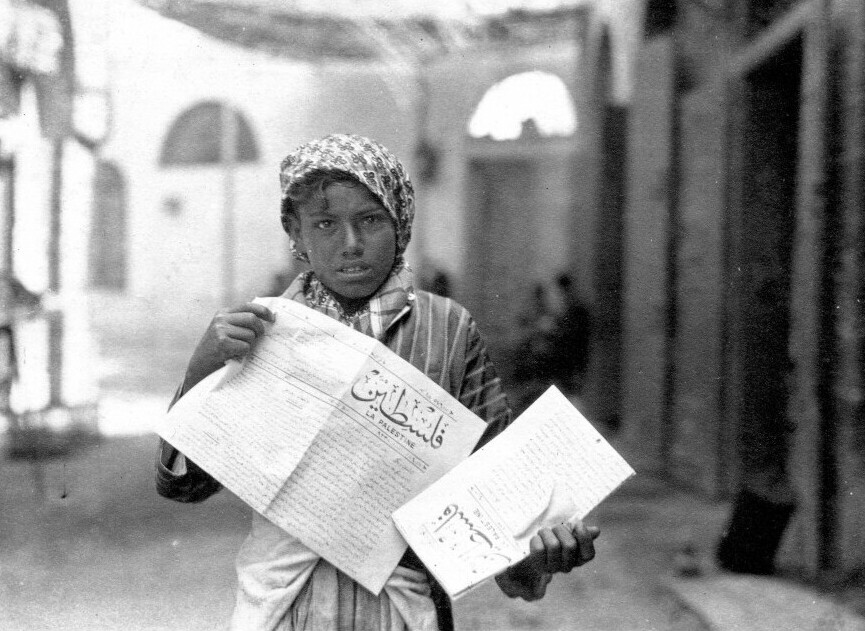
A street vendor selling Falastin newspaper in Jaffa, 1921.

Falastin was established on 14 January 1911 by Issa El-Issa and Yousef El-Issa, two Palestinian Arab Christian cousins from the coastal city of Jaffa in Palestine. It was among a handful of newspapers to have emerged from the region following the 1908 Young Turk Revolution in the Ottoman Empire which lifted press censorship.

Issa El-Issa, a graduate of the American University of Beirut, worked in several places before establishing Falastin. He came from a Palestinian family known for its 'intellect, politics and literature'. The family was financially independent from the Jerusalem Patriarch's charity as it had historically invested in olive oil and soap trading. Issa's cousin Hanna El-Issa, was editor of the short-lived Al-Asma'i magazine which was first published in Jerusalem on 1 September 1908. Much less is known about Hanna's brother Yousef, who was Falastin's editor-in-chief between 1911 and 1914. During World War I, both Issa and Yousef were exiled to Anatolia. Issa became head of King Faisal's royal court after the Arab Kingdom of Syria was established in 1920. After the Kingdom's defeat by French forces the same year, Issa returned to Jaffa where he was allowed to republish Falastin in 1921. Issa's son Raja El-Issa took over the newspaper after 1938.

=== Arab Orthodox Movement ===
If Palestine has a right to say that it has fallen under two mandatories, a British one and a Zionist one, the Orthodox community has the right to say that it has fallen under three mandatories, a British one, a Zionist one, and yet a third Greek one. These three mandatories have combined to aid one another in depriving Palestinian Arabs of their rights.

— Issa El-Issa, founder and editor of the newspaper in October 1931.

The newspaper was initially focused on the Orthodox Renaissance, a movement that aimed to weaken the Greek clerical hegemony over the Greek Orthodox Patriarch of Jerusalem, so that its vast financial resources could be utilized to improve education for the Arab Christians of Palestine. Other topics addressed in the newspaper included modernization, reforms and improving the welfare of the peasants. Zionism was also a central issue editorially, especially based on editors' "concern for the lot of the peasantry."

According to Palestinian sociologist Salim Tamari, Al-Quds newspaper, which appeared in 1908, became "an instrument of the patriarchate against the nationalists," and it was largely due to its success that "the Falastin newspaper was established in Jaffa in 1911 to articulate the demands of the dissident Orthodox intellectuals." Their objectives included: expanding the role of Arab clergy in the administration of the church; involving the Arab laity in the administration of the Church endowments; and improving Orthodox colleges and schools.

=== Opposition to Zionism ===
March 1925 English edition featuring a four-page editorial addressed to Lord Balfour in March 1925, criticizing the Balfour Declaration, which promised British support for the establishment of a "Jewish homeland" in Palestine. The editorial begins with "J'Accuse!", in a reference to the outrage at French anti-semitism 27 years previously.

Falastin went "[f]rom publishing only a few articles on Zionism every month in its first year" to "soon publishing an article or more per issue on the subject," and the paper ultimately "came to be relied upon by newspapers throughout the region for news of Zionist colonization in Palestine." The newspaper addressed its readers as Palestinians since its inception in 1911 during the Ottoman period.

=== Geographic scope ===
Its geographic scope of interest focused on the Mutassarifate of Jerusalem, primarily news from Jaffa and Jerusalem, but also less frequently Hebron, Jericho, and Gaza. The scope of interest later expanded in 1913 to include all of Palestine. The editors sent a copy of each issue to every village in the Jaffa region.

== Suspension ==
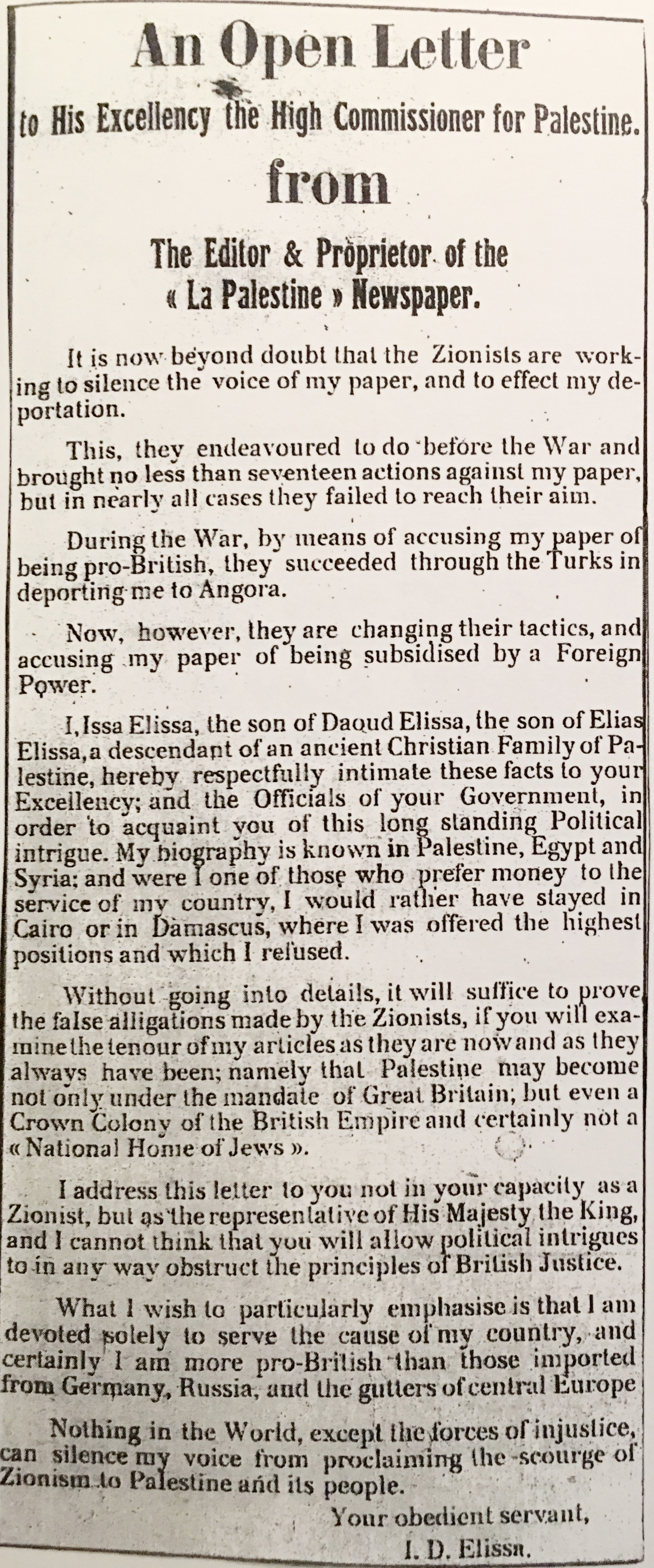
An open letter by Issa El-Issa to Herbert Samuel in 1922

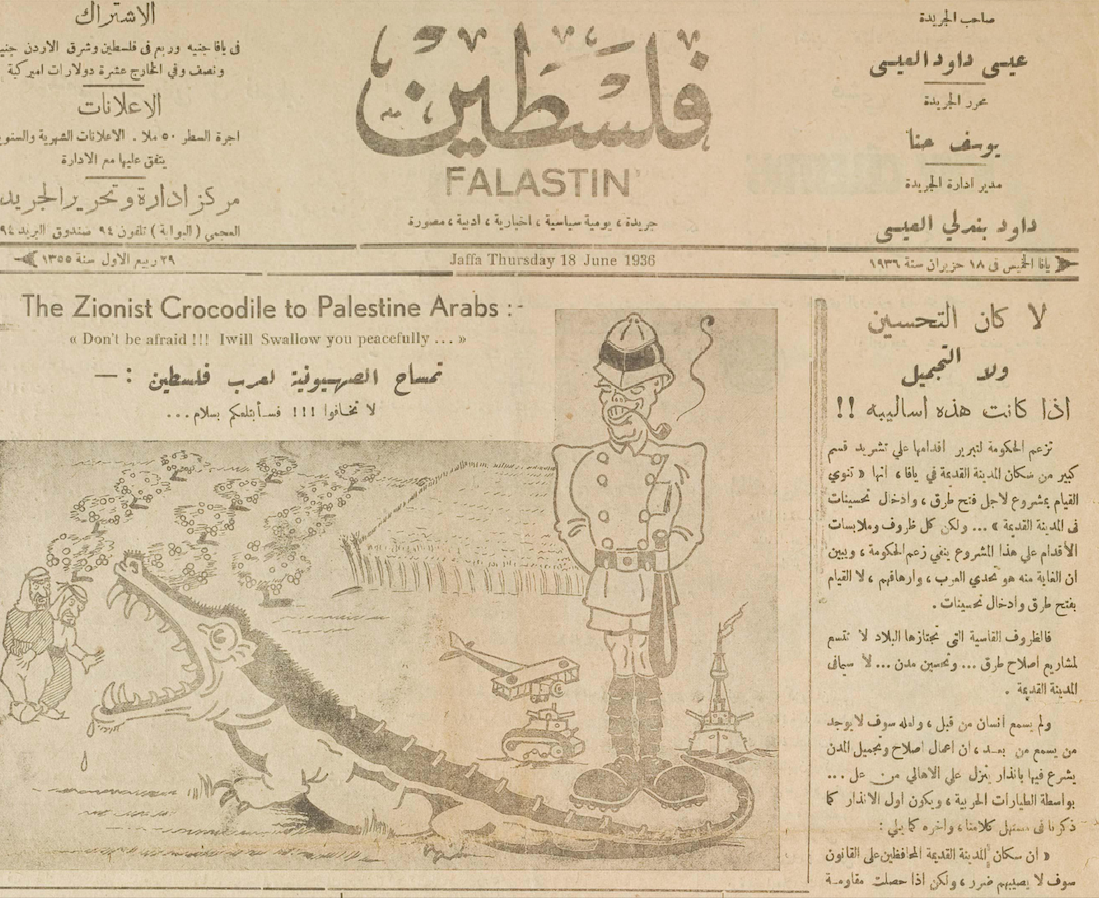
18 June 1936 edition showing Zionism as a crocodile under the protection of a British officer telling Palestinian Arabs: "don't be afraid!!! I will swallow you peacefully...".

Working under the censorship of the Ottoman Empire and the British Mandate, Falastin was suspended from publication over 20 times. In 1914, Falastin was suspended by the Ottoman authorities, once for criticism of the Mutasarrif (November 1913) and once for what British authorities summarized as "a fulminating and vague threat that when the eyes of the nation were opened to the peril towards which it was drifting it would rise like a roaring flood and a consuming fire and there would be trouble in [store] for the Zionists."

Following the first suspension in 1914, Falastin issued a circular responding to the government charges that they were "sowing discord between the elements of the [Ottoman] Empire," which stated that "Zionist" was not the same as "Jew" and described the former as "a political party whose aim is to restore Palestine to their nation and concentrate them in it, and to keep it exclusively for them." The newspaper was supported by Muslim and Christian notables, and a judge annulled the suspension on grounds of freedom of the press.

After the newspaper was allowed to be republished, Issa El-Issa wrote in an editorial that "the Zionists still look at this newspaper with suspicion and consider it the greatest stumbling block that hinders their goals and informs people of their aspirations and what is discussed at their Congresses and what their leaders declare and their newspapers and magazines publish." Defending himself in the Ottoman court, he recounted saying "when we said 'Zionists' we referred to the political organisation with its headquarters in Europe which aims for the colonisation of Palestine, the usurpation of its lands and its transformation into a Jewish homeland". He emphasized his positive attitude towards Jews who he had called "brothers". The court identified with Issa and Yousef's arguments, the latter having testified in favor of his cousin Issa. The Al-Karmil newspaper reported that the crowds waiting inside and outside the courtroom erupted in applause after the verdict was pronounced, "signs of anger appeared on the faces of the Zionists much as signs of joy were visible on the faces of the natives." The French Consulate reported that jubilant crowds had carried the editors on their shoulders after the trial finished.

== Coverage of sport news ==
The establishment of Falastin newspaper in 1911 is considered to be the cornerstone of sports journalism in Ottoman Palestine. It is no coincidence that the most active newspaper, also reported on sporting events. Falastin covered sport news in Ottoman Palestine which helped in shaping the modern Palestinian citizen, bringing the villages and cities together, building Palestinian nationalism and deepening and maintaining Palestinian national identity.

== Influence ==
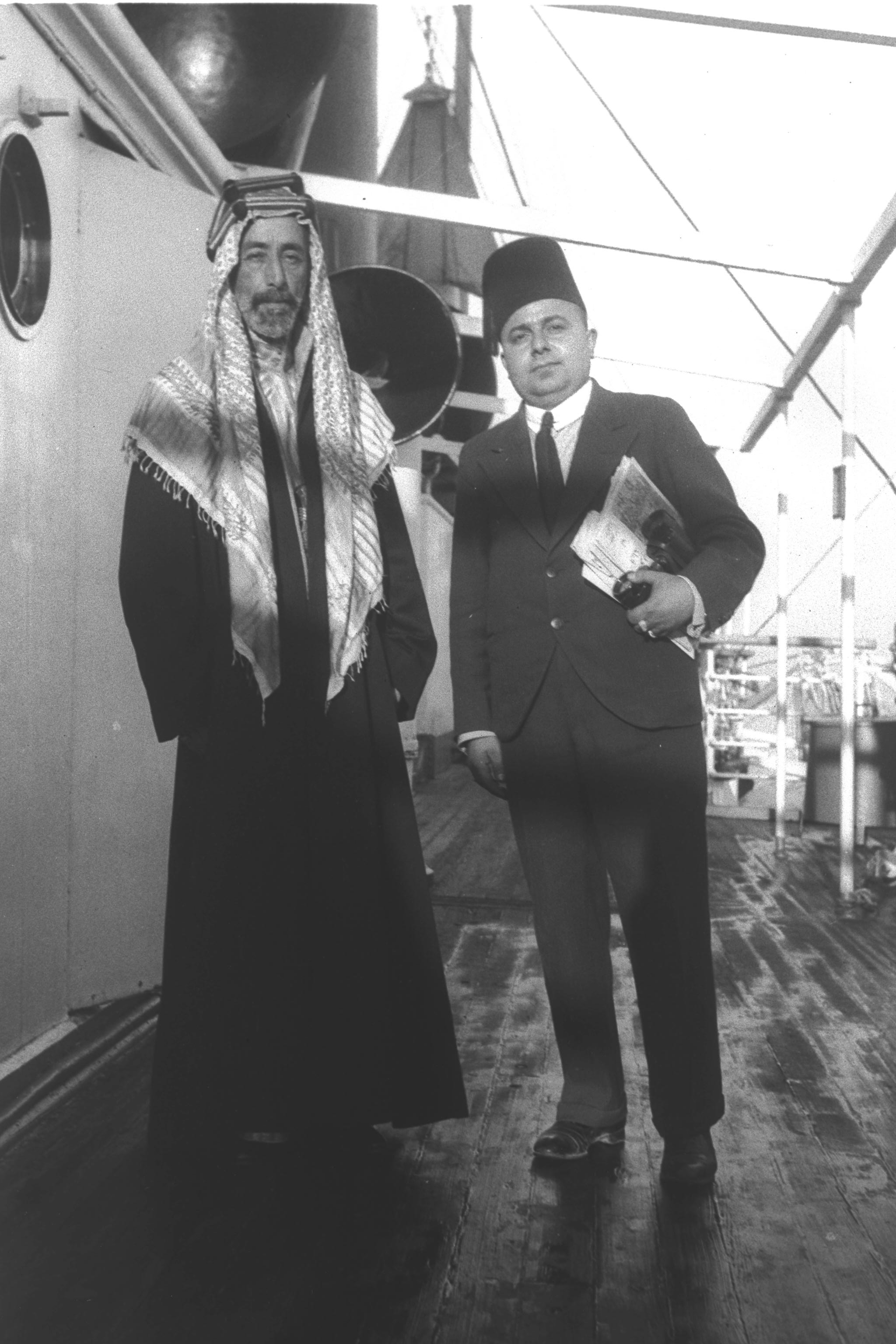
Daoud El-Issa with Sharif Ali, former king of the Hejaz at the Jaffa port, 7 November 1933.

Yousef El-Issa, the newspaper's editor-in-chief during its infancy, was described by a researcher to be "a founder of modern journalism in Palestine". Al Muqattam, one of the most read dailies in Egypt, commented in an editorial when Yousef was editor-in-chief (1911-1914):

Heads of Arabs in all major cities bend to the editorials of Ustad Yousef El-Issa.

Falastin also held influence during the strike in 1936. In 1936, along with Al Difaa, the newspaper played a significant role by encouraging readers to join the general strike that took place in 1936 and lasted for six months and giving it the term the "eighth Wonder of the World".

== Correspondence with Albert Einstein ==
On 19 October 1929, the English version of Falastin published an article titled "Relativity and Propaganda", which was brought to the attention of Albert Einstein, who engaged in a series of correspondences with the newspaper. His first letter, written in German and dating to 28 January 1930, urged cooperation between Arabs and Jews. The newspaper's editor responded to him that Einstein "was taking a heavy draft on our credulity when he asks us to take his ideal as that of the Zionist in Palestine. While believing in his peaceful intentions and his beautiful ideal, we cannot judge the Zionist by Dr. Einstein". Einstein responded with a proposal in his letter dated 15 March 1930, to establish a committee of eight Arabs and Jews - a jurist, a physician, a trade unionist and a cleric from either side - that would meet on a weekly basis to sort out differences between Arabs and Jews.

== Falastin's Centennial ==
"Falastin's Centennial" was a conference that took place in Amman, Jordan, in 2011. Twenty-four local, regional and international researchers and academicians examined Falastin's contribution to the 20th-century Middle East at the two-day conference, which was organised by the Columbia University Middle East Research Centre. The conference highlighted the Jordanian cultural connection to Palestine through various articles published that featured Jordanian cities and news. As the newspaper's founder Issa El-Issa was a confidant and friend of the Hashemite family, the newspaper covered the news of the Hashemites from Sharif Hussein to his sons King Faisal I and King Abdullah I and his grandson King Talal. The paper thus captured King Abdullah's relations with the people of Palestine, documenting every trip he made to a Palestinian town and every stand he took in his support against Zionism. Correspondents of the newspaper in Jordan even interviewed the King in Raghadan Palace.

A participant in the conference stated that

Many people tend to dismiss it as only a newspaper, but in fact, it is a mine of information and documents pertaining to the history of the Arab world.

== Gallery ==
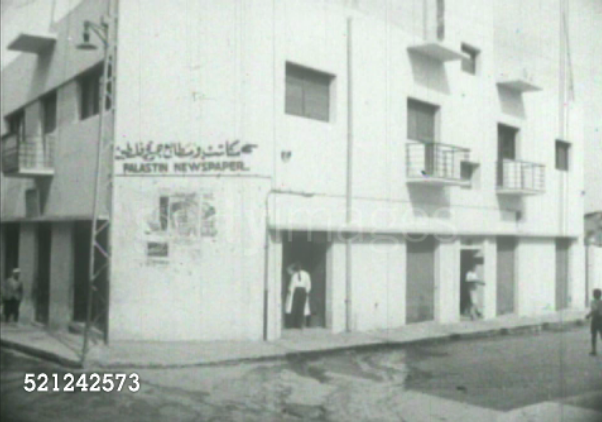
Falastin's headquarters in Ajami neighborhood, Jaffa, 1938

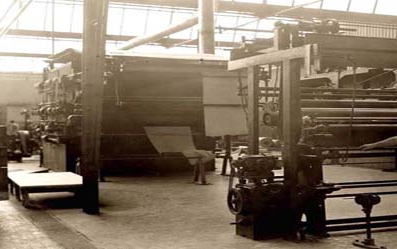
Falastin's headquarters in Jerusalem, 1950s

== See also ==
- El-Issa Family
- Media of the Ottoman Empire
- History of Palestinian journalism
