= National Orthodox School =

Private day school in Amman, Jordan

Coordinates: 31°57′48″N 35°53′35″E

National Orthodox School - Shmaisani
- المدرسة الوطنية الأرثوذكسية - الشميساني
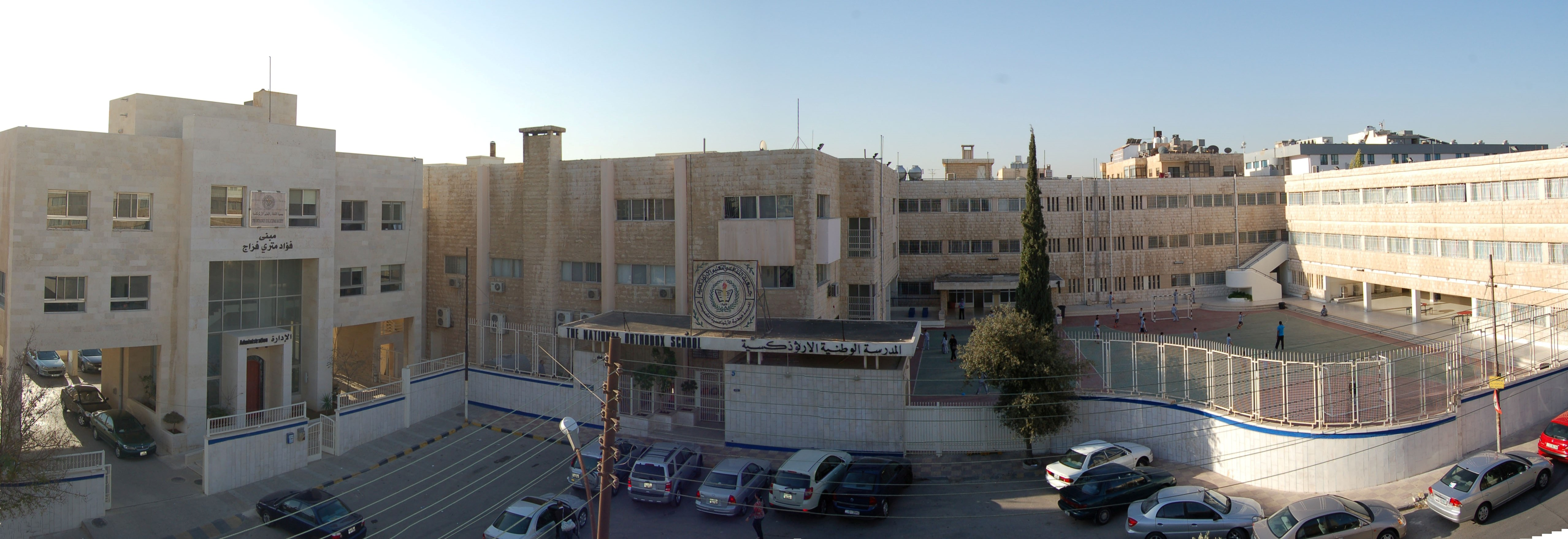
- Amman; Jordan

Information
- Type: Private, co-educational, day school
- Motto: Nurturing and Empowering the Young Leaders of Today
- Religious affiliation: Christian - Greek Orthodox
- Established: 1957
- Oversight: Orthodox Educational Society
- School number: +9625608500
- Head of Principal's Body: May Goussous (in Arabic: مي قسوس)
- Website: http://www.nos.edu.jo/

The National Orthodox School-Shmaisani (NOS) is a private, non-profit, co-educational day school in Amman, Jordan, affiliated with Greek Orthodox Christianity. NOS recently became a candidate school for the International Baccalaureate Diploma Programme, which it plans to offer for Grades 11 and 12 students starting the 2018/2019 academic year.

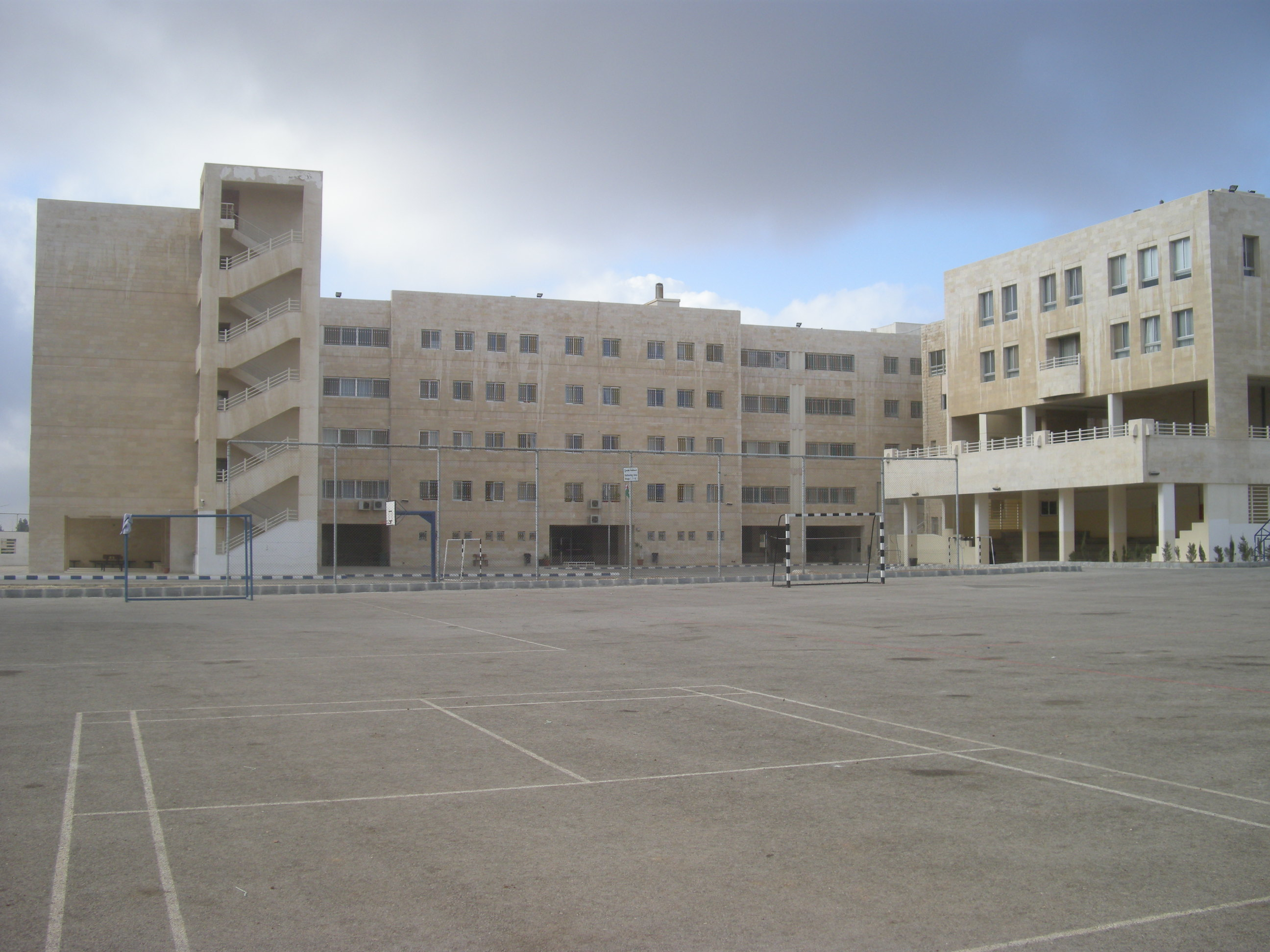
The school buildings

NOS was founded by – and operates under the umbrella of – the Orthodox Educational Society (OES), a national not-profit, charitable organization which has among its philanthropic aims the establishment and administration of schools and other educational institutions throughout Jordan.

Born out of the Arab Orthodox Movement in 1957, NOS was the first co-educational school in the country. Operating out of a rented building in Jabal Amman, they began with only 70 students and four teachers in three grades (KG1 - Grade One). In 1965, they moved to their permanent premises in the Shmaisani area of West Amman, and they continued to grow until they celebrated their first graduating class in 1972. Today, the school's population has grown to approximately 2,400 students (from KG1 to Grade 12), with more than 360 staff members.

The school is an accredited member of the Council of International Schools (CIS).

NOS has also been accredited by the Healthy Schools National Accreditation Project since 2014. The Health Schools project was initiated by The Royal Health Awareness Society in cooperation with the Ministry of Health (MOH) and the Ministry of Education (MOE).

On the academic front, NOS is a Certified Examination Centre for Edexcel Programmes and Cambridge International Programme. In April 2016, NOS became a Candidate School for the International Baccalaureate Programme.

== See also ==
- Arab Orthodox Movement
- Christianity in Jordan
- Tawjihi
- List of private schools in Jordan
- IGCSE
