= Al-Quds (Ottoman period newspaper) =

Arabic newspaper in Jerusalem (1908–1914)

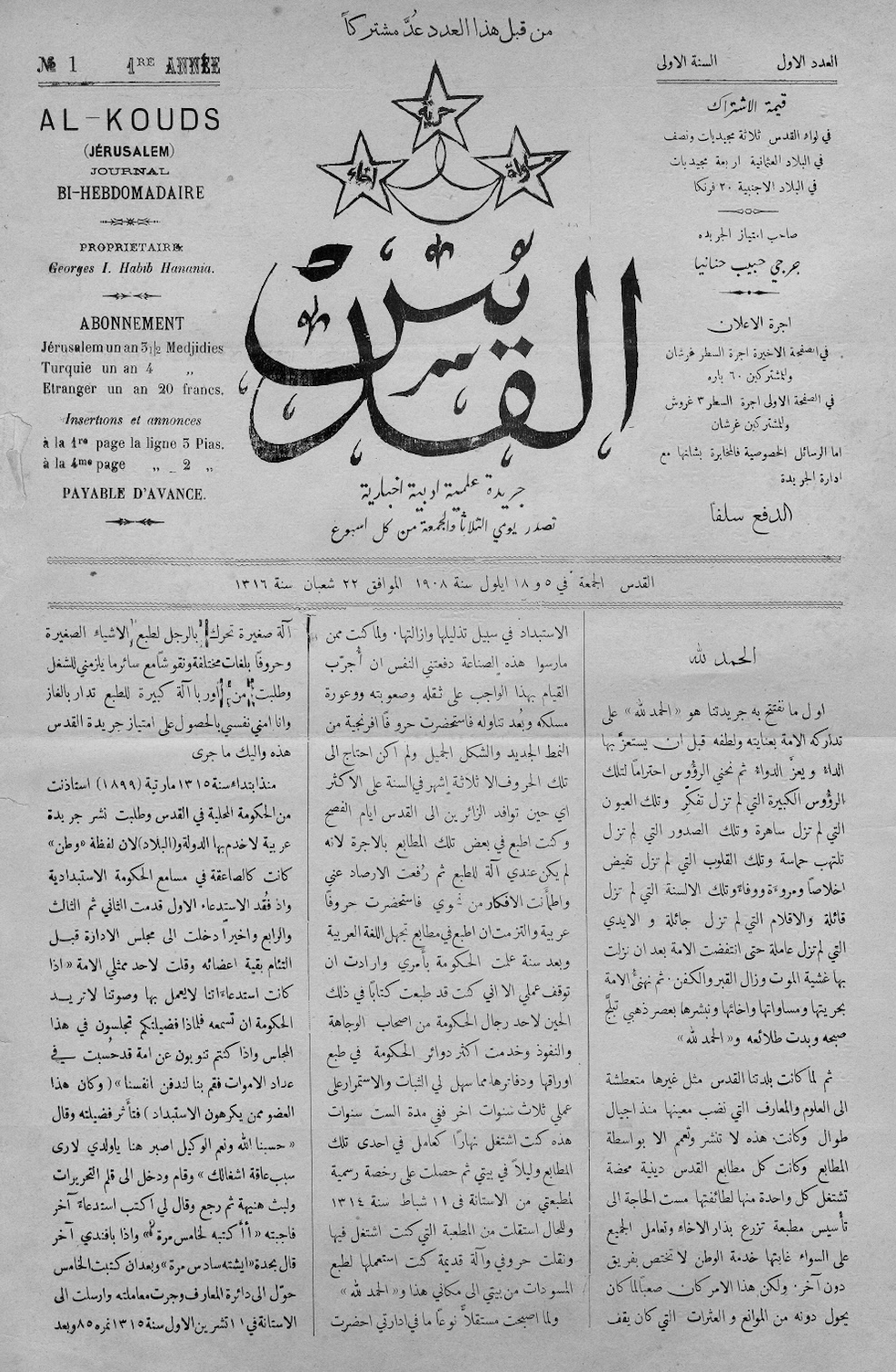
- First issue of al-Quds newspaper on 5 September 1908
- Owner: Jurji Habib Hanania
- Founder: Jurji Habib Hanania
- Publisher: Jurji Habib Hanania
- Editor: Ali Rimawi
- Founded: 18 September 1908
- Ceased publication: 1914
- Language: Arabic
- Headquarters: Jerusalem
- Country: Ottoman Empire
- Circulation: 1,500 (as of 1908)
- Free online archives: Al-Quds archives

Al-Quds (Arabic: القدس, lit. 'Jerusalem') was an Arabic language newspaper published in Jerusalem, Ottoman Empire from 1908 until 1914.

Al-Quds was the first privately owned Arabic-language Palestinian newspaper to have emerged following the 1908 Young Turk Revolution, which lifted press censorship in the empire. It was published by Jurji Habib Hanania (1864-1920), who wrote in an editorial in the first issue of the newspaper on 18 September 1908 that he had applied several times for the permit to publish a newspaper since 1899 without success.

The newspaper started with issues twice a week in four pages and printed in 1,500 copies. Among the authors of the published articles were Khalil al-Sakakini, Isaaf Nashashibi, and Shaykh Ali Rimawi. With the rule of Djemal Pasha, the governor of Syria, freedom of the press worsened and the newspaper was eventually discontinued.

== See also ==
- Media of the Ottoman Empire

== Literature ==
- Hanania, Mary (2007). "Jurji Habib Hanania: History of the Earliest Press in Palestine, 1908-1914" (PDF). The Jerusalem Quarterly (32): 51–69. ISSN 0334-4800.
