= Raja El-Issa =

Palestinian journalist (1922–2008)

- رجا عيسى ﺍﻟﻌﻴﺴﻰ
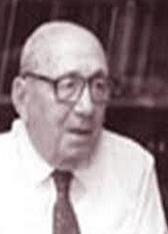
- Born: 14 October 1922; Jaffa
- Died: 1 December 2008 (aged 86); Amman, Jordan
- Occupation: Journalist
- Spouse: Nadia Elissa

Raja Issa El-Issa (Arabic: رجا عيسى ﺍﻟﻌﻴﺴﻰ) (1922 – December 1, 2008) was a Palestinian journalist.

== Early life ==
El-Issa was born in Jaffa to the prominent Palestinian Christian El-Issa family. The family is known for its 'intellect, politics and literature'. Eleven years before his birth, his father Issa El-Issa founded the pioneering Falastin newspaper.

== Career ==
El-Issa took the managers position of the newspaper after his father's death, and later became the first chairman of the Jordan Press Association in Amman, Jordan, 1956. The slogan El-Issa advocated in the press sector for nearly a quarter of a century was the saying of Mustafa Kemal: "Freedom is not dear to a people who work to obtain it. They strive to achieve it... the rock melts and crumbles as the water falls on it drop by drop."

On Falastin,

"Falastin was published in Jaffa from 1911 until April 1948. All newspapers stopped in one day. After we closed, they started firing mine launchers at Jaffa city very intensively. With a capable ability, the sea was filled with ships in order for the people to board, and this is what happened. The people of Jaffa left homes, interests and jobs. They are all gone... they are all gone... there was no one left. Two weeks before the closure, I traveled to Egypt and could not return. I returned for the first time in November from Beirut, and then back to Egypt, and later returned to Yafa from the sea from Alexandria. I went again to Egypt and was not able to return to Jaffa because the travel was impossible and difficult. There was no travel by ships, nor travel by land or air, or anything. All of Falastins printing equipment, all paper stores, old issues and collections, drafts, and all of its material possessions in Jaffa had been lost."

The newspaper continued to be published in East Jerusalem until 1967 when it was merged with Al-Manar to produce the Jordanian-based Ad-Dustuor newspaper based in Amman, which is still published today. El-Issa wrote an influential opening editorial for the paper in 1967 titled “Between Me and Her, Companionship and Life.” It reflects on his childhood dreams, the emotions of a bully, and youthful determination. As El-Issa said,

"I saw the light, and it is my address to the challenge. A platform for insight and a call for preparation. It motivates people to resist the Zionist invasion and the conspiracies of colonialism."

On the attempted assassination of his editor-in-chief by rebel elements,

"One of the events that I have not forgotten in my life is the attempted assassination of my editor-in-chief Youssef Hanna by some rebel elements because of his political stance towards them. However, he was not harmed. Professor Youssef Hanna went and wrote an article, which is one of the most beautiful articles I have read. It was titled My Arab Brother. I even remember that those responsible behind this attempted assassination apologized to Youssef Hanna and kissed his head due to the severity and excessive emotionality of the tone in the article."

== Personal life ==
El-Issa was married to Nadia, a Syro-Lebanese woman. He died on 1 December 2008 at the age of 86 in Amman.
