= Issa Michuzi =

Tanzanian photojournalist (born 1980)

- Born: 1980 (age 45–46); Dar es salaam
- Education: IIJ; UDSM
- Occupations: Photojournalist; Blogger (2005–present)
- Years active: 1990–present
- Known for: Michuzi Blog
- Awards: Best Political Blog (2011) (Note: 1st Annual Tanzanian Blog Awards); VADE Local Digital Media (Note: Vodacom Awards for Digital Excellence, 2012)
- Website: issamichuzi.blogspot.com

Muhidin Issa Michuzi is a Tanzanian photojournalist and blogger.

== Early life and career ==
Michuzi had an interest in photography. In the 1980s, he joined an evening photography course at the Goethe-Institut in Dar es Salaam. One of his photographs was selected for the front page of the Daily News, a government-owned newspaper. He was subsequently employed as a stringer for three years before being employed formally on 1 January 1990.

In 1992, he joined the Internationales Institut für Journalismus in Berlin for an advanced photojournalism course. He later joined the Tanzania School of Journalism (present-day School of Journalism and Mass Communication) at the University of Dar es Salaam and graduated in 1996.

In 2006 he was awarded a scholarship to attend a specialized course in digital photography in Cardiff, Wales and has since been associated with the Daily News.

== Blogging career ==
In September 2005, Michuzi had accompanied the former Tanzanian foreign minister Jakaya Kikwete who was attending the Helsinki Conference in Finland. There, he met Ndesanjo Macha who assisted him in setting up his blog. The first blog entry was made on 8 September 2005. His intention was to inform the Tanzanian diaspora about news related to the motherland via a photoblog.
