= Khalil Sakakini =

Palestinian poet (1878–1953)

- خليل السكاكيني
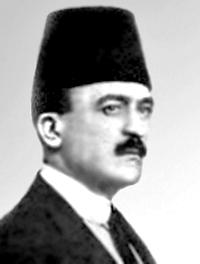
- Born: January 23, 1878; Jerusalem, Ottoman Empire
- Died: August 13, 1953 (aged 75); Cairo, Egypt
- Known for: Arab nationalism

Khalil Sakakini (Arabic: خليل السكاكيني; 23 January 1878 – 13 August 1953) was a Palestinian teacher, scholar, poet, and Arab nationalist.

== Biography ==
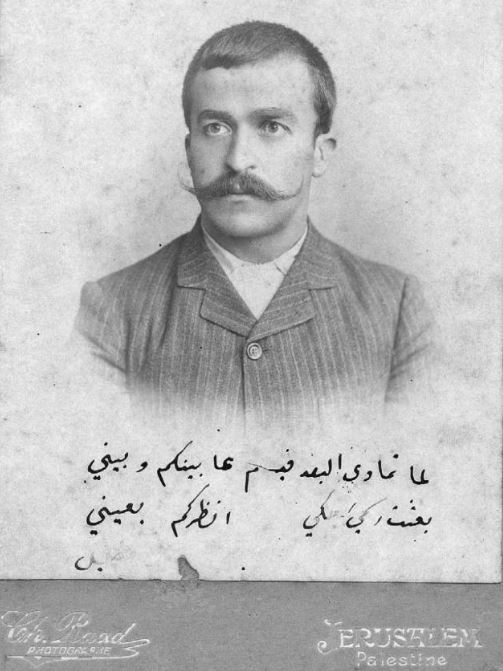
Khalil Raad, Signed portrait of Khalil Sakakini, Jerusalem, 1906

Sakakini was born into a Palestinian Christian Orthodox family in Jerusalem in the Ottoman Empire on 23 January 1878. His younger sister Melia Sakakini was born in 1890. He received his schooling in Jerusalem at the Greek Orthodox school, at the Anglican Christian Mission Society (CMS) College founded by Bishop Blyth, and at the Zion English College where he read literature.

Later, Sakakini traveled to the United Kingdom and from there to the United States to join his brother Yusif, an itinerant salesman living in Philadelphia, Pennsylvania. During his nine-month stay in America, Khalil Sakakini wrote for Arabic literary magazines on the East Coast, and did translations for Professor Richard Gottheil at Columbia University. He supported himself by teaching Arabic and working in a factory in Maine; he also worked as a street vendor. Upon his return in 1908, Khalil Sakakini worked as a journalist for the Jerusalem-printed magazine Al-Asma'i and taught Arabic at the Salahiyya school and tutored expatriates at the American Colony. He also contributed to Al Nafais Al Asriyyah, a literary magazine based in Jerusalem. Sari followed Wadie Tarazi (Gaza Christian that attended Friends School of Ramallah) to Haverford College and was a freshman in 1932 but seems to have dropped out or transferred as is mentioned in Haverford's 1936 Yearbook.

Sakakini's wife, Sultana, died in October 1939 and was buried in the Greek Orthodox cemetery on Mount Zion. He wrote poems eulogizing her. His son, Sari, completed his Master's degree at the University of Michigan and returned to Jerusalem, to work for the American consulate.

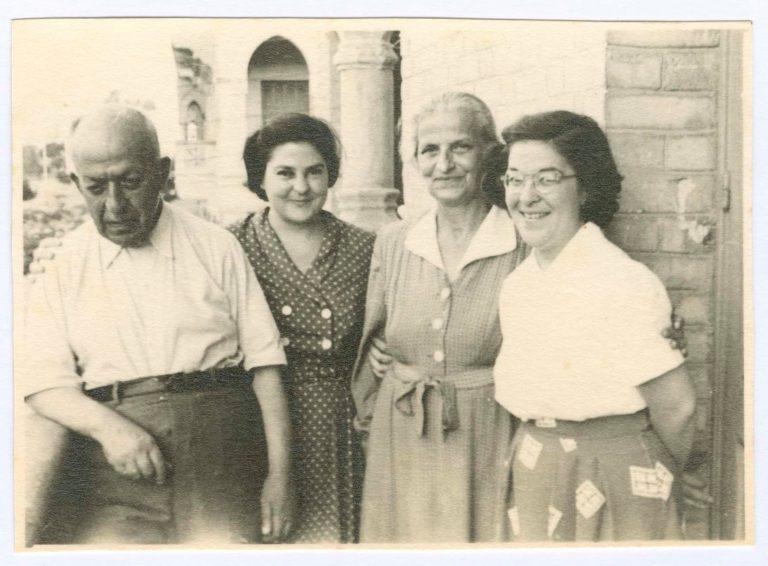
Khalil al-Sakakini, with his daughters, Hala and Dumia on the right on either side of his sister Melia Sakakini

During the 1948 Arab-Israeli War, the Sakakinis were one of the last families to leave the Katamon neighborhood. A few days before the city was divided, the Sakakini family fled to Cairo, Egypt. There, Khalil Sakakini was nominated by the Egyptian writer Taha Hussein to join the Arabic Language Academy.

Sari Sakakini's sudden death of a heart attack in 1953 at the age of 39 was a devastating blow. Khalil Sakakini died three months later, on 13 August 1953. Sakakini's two daughters, Dumya and Hala, lived together in Ramallah until their deaths, in 2002 and 2003, respectively. The two sisters had careers in education. Hala Sakakini edited her father's journals, published in 1955, and wrote two memoirs in English, Jerusalem and I and Twosome.

== Pedagogic career ==
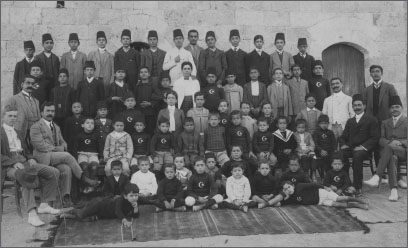
A school photograph of al-Dusturiyyeh School in Jerusalem. Khalil Sakakini is seated second from the left.

In 1909, Khalil Sakakini founded the Dusturiyyah school or National School, which became known for its Arab nationalist approach. Sakakini pioneered a progressive education system: no grades, prizes or punishments for the students, and emphasis being placed on music, education and athletics. He also introduced new methods of teaching Arabic, and made it the primary language of instruction instead of Turkish.

Wasif Jawhariyyeh, noted for his memoirs of early 20th century Jerusalem, was a pupil of his in the Dusturiyyah School. He praised Sakakini's education style.

Mr. Sakakini taught us Arabic in a way that was very popular with the students. He used a method which, to my knowledge, few teachers in the East liked to use. He did not make students memorize rules of grammar like most teachers used to do ... His lessons included anecdotes which the students of this great educator received with eagerness and excitement. For with him they were able to understand what it took them long hours to grasp with other teachers. He instilled in them patriotism and manliness. ... Having chosen to name his school the “Dusturiyyeh,” or National, School, Sakakini was the first to ban corporal punishment in education, and this wise stance spread to other schools. Whenever he noticed the slightest inappropriate conduct on the part of a student, particularly on the moral level, not withstanding his fatherly love for the pupil in question, he went berserk and pulled on an angry face, frightening the student who had the utmost respect and esteem for him and who would then amend his behavior immediately.

— Wasif Jawhariyyeh, The Storyteller of Jerusalem

Sakakini led a movement to reform and change into a more Arab approach to what he considered to be a corrupt Greek Orthodox Church of Jerusalem, and wrote a pamphlet in 1913 titled "The Orthodox Renaissance in Palestine", which led to his excommunication from the Greek Orthodox Church. Ottoman authorities arrested him on the last day of Ottoman Rule in Jerusalem in 1917, after he had sheltered a Polish-American Jew and fellow citizen of Jerusalem, Alter Levine. Both were sent to a prison in Damascus, Syria. Levine became an enemy when the United States joined the Allies of World War I. Even so, Levine and Sakakini became close friends during their incarceration. He was visited in prison by his wife and his sister Melia. Upon his release, Sakakini boarded for a brief time with Musa Alami, a former pupil, and then joined the Arab Revolt, for which he composed its anthem.

In 1919, Khalil Sakakini and his wife began to work for the Educational Authority of Palestine in Jerusalem, and Sakakini was appointed head of the Jerusalem Teachers’ College. He later became Inspector for Education in Palestine, a post he held for 12 years, until his resignation in protest of the appointment of a Jew as High Commissioner of the Palestine Mandate, Herbert Samuel. After working as a school principal in Cairo, he returned to Palestine in 1926 and became a school inspector. At the same time, he wrote political commentaries for the newspapers al-Muqtataf, al-Hilal and al-Siyassa al-Usbu'iyya, composed patriotic poems, and spoke at political rallies. In 1925, he founded the Wataniyya school, and in 1938 the Nahda College in Jerusalem. In May 1934, Sakakini built a home in the Katamon neighborhood which was completed in three years. In 1932, he sent his son Sari to Haverford College, Pennsylvania.

== Views and opinions ==
Throughout his life Khalil Sakakini embraced European culture. Having a Greek grandmother led to an interest in Greek music and Greek philosophy. He even nicknamed himself "Socrates".

Sakakini expressed humanistic ideas and had a business card made out to read "Khalil Sakakini: human being, God willing." At the same time, he defined himself first and foremost as an Arab and was an "ardent" Arab nationalist hailed by some as one of the founding fathers of Arab nationalism of the region. He was an advocate of Pan-Arabism and envisaged Palestine united with "Greater Syria" (present-day Syria, Lebanon, Jordan, and Palestine). He saw Zionism as a great threat before the First World War and believed that the Jewish right to the land had expired while the Arab right was "a living one".

Sakakini, listing some of the punishments to be meted out: bomb and shoot the British and Jewish invaders, torch Jewish fields and orange groves, ambush routine traffic, block roads, derail trains, cut power lines. He continued: "The battle in Palestine is in full force... Victory is in the hands of God... If we live, we shall live with honor. If we die - we shall die with honor.

During the 1936–39 Arab revolt in Palestine, Sakakini applauded the Arab attacks on Jews, but worried that the violence looked bad in the eyes of the public because 'the Jews controlled the newspapers and radio'. Therefore, Sakakini had to conclude, that 'the sword was mightier than the book'. For a grenade attack on a Jewish civilian train, he praised the "heroes" responsible. After the attack on Jerusalem's Edison cinema that left three dead, he wrote:

"There is no other heroism like this, except the heroism of Sheikh al-Qassam".

"I feel the pain of the troubles, whether they fall on Arabs or on the English or on the Jews. For that reason you will sometimes find me on the side of the Arabs, at others times on the side of the English, and still other times on the side of the Jews. And if there were animals who suffered from even a faint whiff of these troubles, I would sometimes be on the side of the animals.

Khalil Sakakini also came to believe that Nazi Germany might weaken the British and 'liberate Palestine from the Jew', and therefore supported the Nazis. He wrote that Adolf Hitler had opened the World's eyes to Jewish world power, and that Germany had stood up to the Jews and put them in their place, much like Mussolini had done with the British.

Sakakini vehemently opposed allowing Holocaust survivors into Palestine, arguing that a human problem needed to be solved by all humanity. While saddened by events such as the Struma disaster, he felt that the passengers were in fact invaders. An independent Palestinian Arab government should have used force to prevent them from landing, and he felt that while elderly Jews could come to live out their last years as had happened in the past, a thriving Jewish community under British protection should be forbidden. Sakakini believed that the Holocaust was being exploited parasitically by Jews demanding a homeland in Palestine, who he said would throw the Arabs out as soon as they got their homeland. Due to the Jewish influence in the United States, he believed that their right to vote in that country should be revoked.

Sakakini was a lifelong advocate of social reform. He tried to inculcate principles of students' liberation, sex education, socialist and other progressive ideas, and believed in free mingling of the sexes.

== Legacy ==
Sakakini's published work includes educational treatises, poetry collections, literary, philosophical and political essays, and his diaries. A street and a school in Jerusalem are named after him, the Jezzar Pasha Mosque's library in Acre, Israel, as well as a street in Cairo. His publications are now at the Hebrew University of Jerusalem. He is buried in the Mar Gerges Cemetery in Cairo.

In 2001, the Khalil Sakakini Cultural Center successfully petitioned the municipality of Ramallah to rename the main thoroughfare nearest the center after Sakakini. That same year, the center began editing and publishing the diaries of Sakakini, which he kept from 1907 to 1952. The first volume of the projected eight volumes was published in 2003. In 2003 too, Sakakini's heirs bequeathed the center his collection of publications, books, and personal effects. These are on display in the foyer of the Khalil Sakakini Cultural Center.

== See also ==
- Palestinian Christians
