= Issa El-Issa =

Palestinian journalist (1878–1950)

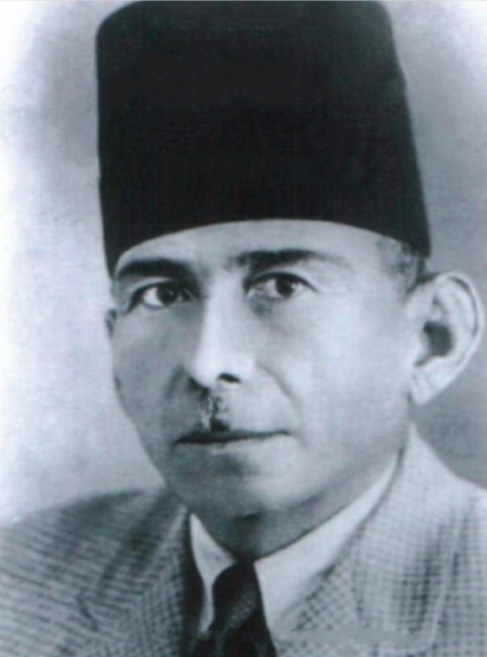
- Born: 1878; Jaffa, Mutasarrifate of Jerusalem, Ottoman Empire
- Died: 29 June 1950 (aged 71–72); Beirut, Lebanon
- Occupation: Journalist

Issa Daoud El-Issa (Arabic: عيسى داود العيسى, his surname also spelt al Issa and Elissa; 1878 – 29 June 1950) (Note: The name Issa means Jesus in Arabic, and Daoud means David.) was a Palestinian poet and journalist. With his cousin Yousef El-Issa, he founded and edited the biweekly newspaper Falastin in 1911, based in his hometown of Jaffa. Falastin became one of the most prominent and long running in the country at the time, and was dedicated to the cause of the Arab Orthodox Movement in struggle with the Greek clergy of the Orthodox Patriarchate of Jerusalem. The newspaper was the country's fiercest and most consistent critic of the Zionist movement, denouncing it as a threat to Palestine's Arab population. It helped shape Palestinian identity and was shut down several times by the Ottoman and British authorities.

== Biography ==
Issa El-Issa was born to the Palestinian Christian El-Issa family. Exiled during World War I, al-Issa became chief of the Arab Kingdom of Syria's royal court in Damascus during King Faisal's government that lasted five months. During that time, he required the publishers of Damascus-based newspapers to dedicate half of their newspaper columns to the Palestinian cause as prerequisite to receiving their monthly salaries.

In June 1928, Al-Issa was elected to the 7th Congress of the Arab Executive Committee (AEC) as a representative of Jaffa. During his time on the committee, he joined the National Defense Party, the opposition to Hajj Amin al-Husayni's sympathizers on the AEC. Al-Issa hosted Arab Christian-Orthodox conferences in Mandatory Palestine and Transjordan.

His son Raja El-Issa succeeded him as the publisher of Falastin. On 29 June 1950, al-Issa died in Beirut, Lebanon. Issa once experienced an assassination attempt in August 1936.

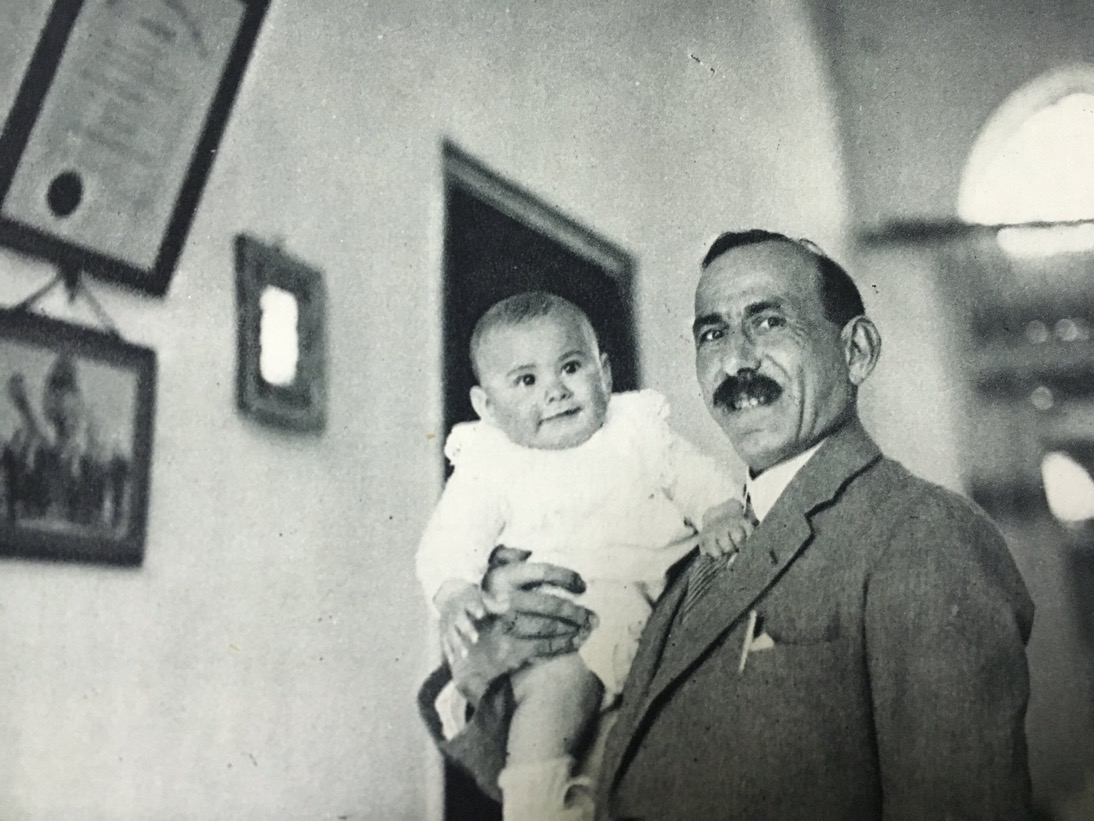
Issa al Issa with his child in Jaffa

== Bibliography ==
- Beška, Emanuel (2016). From Ambivalence to Hostility: The Arabic Newspaper Filastin and Zionism, 1911–1914. Slovak Academic Press. ISBN 978-80-89607-49-5.
- Bracy, R. Michael (2010). Printing Class: 'Isa al-'Isa, Filastin, and the Textual Construction of National Identity, 1911-1931. University Press of America. ISBN 978-0761853770.
- Tamari, Salim (2014). "Issa al Issa's Unorthodox Orthodoxy: Banned in Jerusalem, Permitted in Jaffa". Jerusalem Quarterly (59). Institute for Palestine Studies: 16–36. doi:10.70190/jq.I59.p16.
- Noha Tadros Khalaf, Les mémoires de 'Issa al-'Issa: journaliste et intellectuel palestinien (1878-1949), Paris : Karthala, 2009
