= Arab Orthodox Society =

Eastern Orthodox charitable organization in Jerusalem

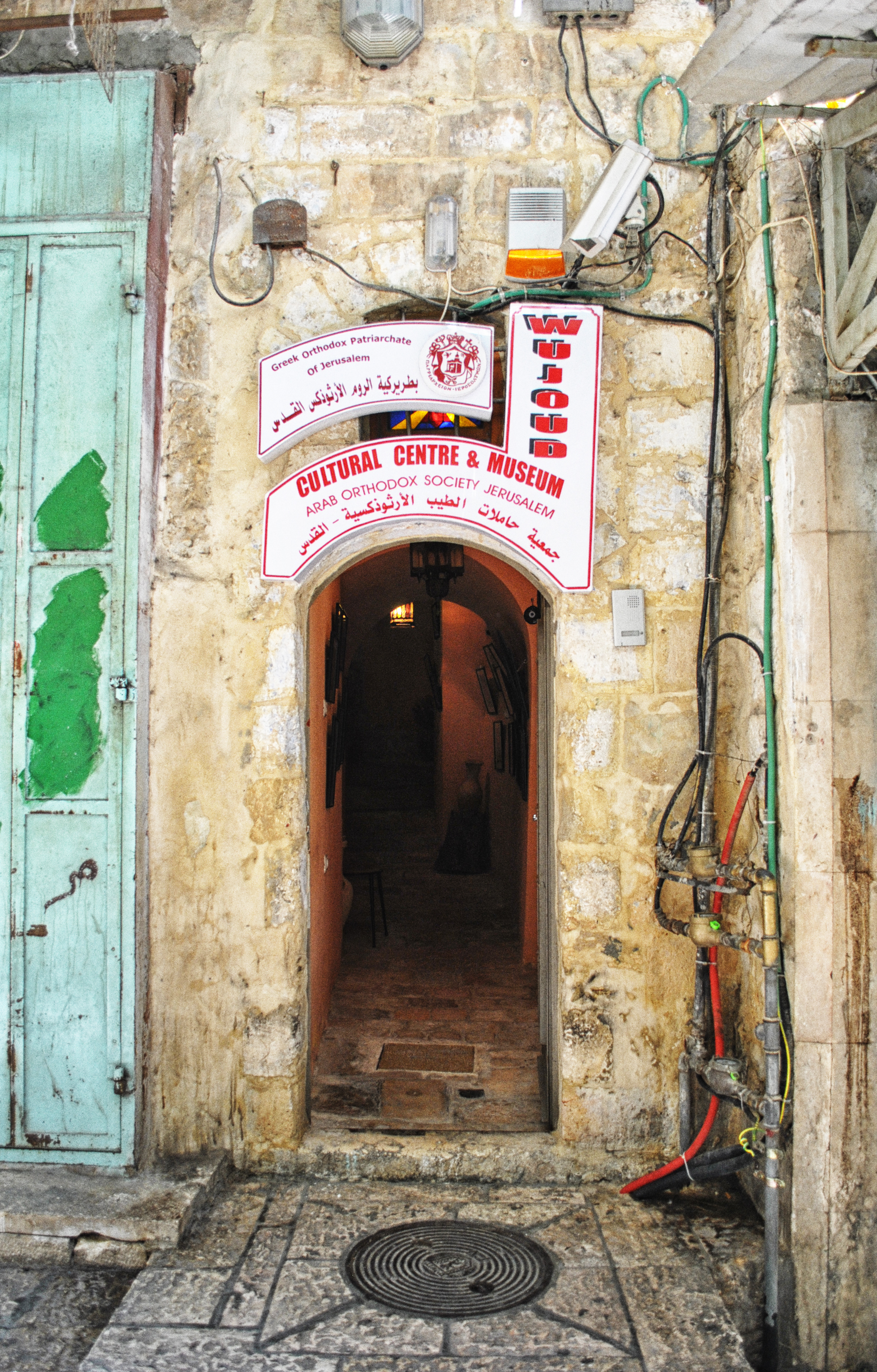
- Cultural Centre of Arab Orthodox Society at David Street, Jerusalem
- Type: Charitable organization
- Headquarters: Old City of Jerusalem, near the New Gate
- Location: Christian Quarter
- Services: Medical care, employment, cultural center, museum, embroidery shop, bakery, coffee shop
- Affiliations: Greek Orthodox Church of Jerusalem

The Arab Orthodox Society is an Eastern Orthodox charitable organization located near the New Gate in the Christian Quarter of the Old City of Jerusalem. A part of the Greek Orthodox Church of Jerusalem, it provides its local community with medical care, employment, a cultural center, a museum, an embroidery shop, a bakery, and a coffee shop.

== Projects ==
St. Benedictos Medical Center provides medical care to the needy. Payments for services are adjusted to the patient's ability to pay. The medical staff includes an on-site x-ray technician, a full-time dentist, and other specialists. The center also provides a doctor, nurse, and social worker to do home visits for elderly patients.

The Melia Art and Training Center provides employment for Palestinian women who hand-embroider traditional Palestinian designs and sell the finished pieces through the shop.

The "Bint al-Balad" bakery (literally, "Daughter of the Country"), prepares traditional Palestinian dishes including pies, pastries, and salads. The shop also offers catering services for parties and celebrations.

Wujud (literally, "existence") is a cultural center and museum celebrating Palestinian heritage housed in a historic building donated by the Greek Orthodox Patriarchate. The museum overlooks one of the two Old City dry pools, Hezekiah's Pool, also known as the Bath of the Patriarchs. Built during the Mamluk period, used by the Ottoman military, and then as a residential home at the end of the British Mandate, the building was neglected for 42 years before it was renovated and restored on May 14, 2010. Wujoud includes an ethno-museum, cultural center and a cafeteria.

== See also ==
- Arab Christians
- Palestinian Christians
- Greek Orthodox Church of Jerusalem
