= Yousef El-Issa =

Palestinian journalist (1870–1948)

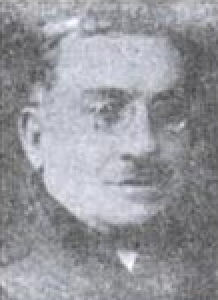
- Born: 1870; Jaffa, Jerusalem Sanjak, Ottoman Empire
- Died: 1948 (aged 77–78); Damascus, Syria
- Occupation: Journalist

Yousef El-Issa (alternative: Yusuf al-‘Isa) (Arabic: يوسف العيسى) was a Palestinian journalist. He established the Falastin newspaper with his cousin Issa El-Issa in 1911, based in his hometown of Jaffa. Falastin became one of the most prominent and long running in the country at the time, was dedicated to Arab Nationalism and the cause of the Arab Orthodox Movement in its struggle with the Greek clergy of the Orthodox Patriarchate of Jerusalem. They were passionately opposed to Zionism and Jewish immigration to Palestine. He has been described by a researcher to be "a founder of modern journalism in Palestine". He founded a newspaper entitled AlifBa in Damascus in March 1930.

Al Muqattam, one of the most read dailies in Egypt, commented in an editorial when El-Issa was editor-in-chief (1911-1914): “Heads of Arabs in all major cities bend to the editorials of Ustad Yousef EL-Issa.
