= History of Palestinian journalism =

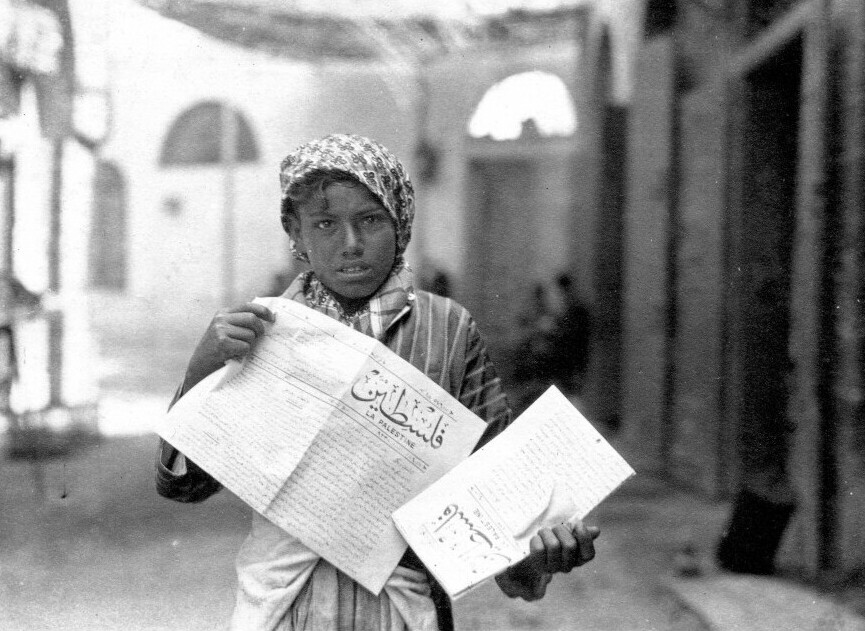
Female Palestinian street vendor selling copies of the Falastin newspaper in Jaffa, Mandatory Palestine in 1921

The history of Palestinian journalism dates back to the 19th century, and more newspapers in Palestine began to appear after the lifting of press censorship in the Ottoman Empire in 1908 following the Young Turk Revolution. Newspapers in the region were primarily written in Arabic, Hebrew, and Ottoman Turkish. Arabic-language newspapers voiced Arab aspirations, largely opposing Zionism, whilst the Hebrew newspapers largely supported Zionism. Al-Karmil was established in 1908 and Falastin in 1911, both published by Palestinian Christians, whilst Haaretz, established in 1918, is the longest-running newspaper established by Palestinian Jews.

However, the emerging press was soon suppressed after the outbreak of World War I in 1914. When Palestine became a British Mandate in 1920, its press became more diverse, as over 250 Arabic newspapers and 65 in other languages were circulating in Mandatory Palestine by the mid-1930s. The British began to introduce restrictive measures after the 1929 Palestine riots, and suspended many major publications during the 1936–1939 Arab revolt. Following the outbreak of World War II in 1939, the British authorities closed almost all the newspapers, with the exception of Falastin and Al-Difa', whose rivalry marked the mandate period.

The 1948 Palestine war forced Falastin and Al-Difa to move from Jaffa to East Jerusalem, which along with Al-Jihad, became Jordan's press for many years. Jordan issued a new press law in early 1967 that forced a merger of newspapers, leaving only East Jerusalem-based Al-Quds. Israel's occupation of the West Bank and the Gaza Strip following the Six Day War in 1967 brought the Palestinian press under Israeli military censorship, which would continue until the establishment of the Palestinian Authority in 1993. The three main newspapers circulating in the Palestinian territories today include Al-Quds; and Ramallah-based Al-Hayat Al-Jadida and Al-Ayyam.

Palestinian journalists reporting from the occupied territories have witnessed restrictions and risks, especially during the First and Second Intifadas which started in 1987 and 2000 respectively, and the ongoing Gaza war. The year 2023 saw record numbers of Palestinian journalists arrested and killed by the Israeli military. The rise of the internet in the 1990s gave Palestinians a new platform to share their narrative, such as the creation of Palestine Chronicle and The Electronic Intifada English websites, and Quds News Network and Shehab News Agency. Since then print newspapers have been challenged by the rise of such digital and citizen journalism, which has been faced with a "systematic censorship" campaign by some social media sites, such as Facebook.

== Print journalism ==
=== Background ===
The first printing house in Palestine was established in Safed in 1577 by Rabbi Avraham ben Yitzchak Ashkenazi and Eliezer ben Isaac Ashkenazi, who printed ten books between 1577 and 1587, the first books ever printed in the Near East. The same type was used by Josiah ben Joseph Pinto in Damascus in 1605.

The Ottoman Empire banned use of the printing press from its invention in the 15th century until the mid-1700s, and the banned of its public use until the mid-1800s, which was one of the main obstacles preventing the early onset of journalism in the region.

=== 19th century ===
In 1831, Yisrael Bak reestablished a printing house in Safed, moving it to Jerusalem in 1841 following an earthquake in Safed. A second printing house was opened in Jerusalem in 1862, and Jerusalem became the primary printing centre in the Palestine region for the rest of the 19th century.

The printing press also began to be used by Christian institutions to produce religious texts, first by Jerusalem's Franciscan Church in 1846, and followed afterwards by the Armenian and Greek Churches. The first daily privately published Arabic-language newspapers in the Ottoman Empire's Arab provinces, which enjoyed varying degrees of autonomy, appeared in Beirut in 1873 and in Cairo in 1875. By the year 1908 Egypt boasted 627 publications with a circulation of around 100,000.

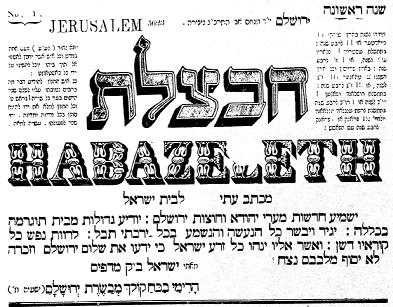
Havatzelet (1863–1911) was one of the first Hebrew-language newspapers in Palestine

The first newspaper published in Palestine was HaLevanon, established in Jerusalem in early 1863 by Yehiel Bril, Michal HaCohen and Yoel Moshe Salomon. The paper originated from an effort by Jerusalem's Misnagdim to reduce their reliance on Yisrael Bak's Hasidic-aligned printing house, which resulted in Salomon and HaCohen studying printing at Königsberg, before conceiving HaLevanon upon their return. They subsequently established their own printing house at Nahalat Shiv'a and began its publication. The paper moved to Europe, having been shut down in Palestine by Ottoman authorities in December 1863 after being reported to them by Bak, who had started publishing rival paper Havatzelet in mid-1863. Havatzelet ceased printing after its fifth issue in 1864, at the same time as the closure of HaLevanon, and was renewed again in 1870, remaining in publication until 1911. Both HaLevanon and Havatzelet were published in Hebrew.

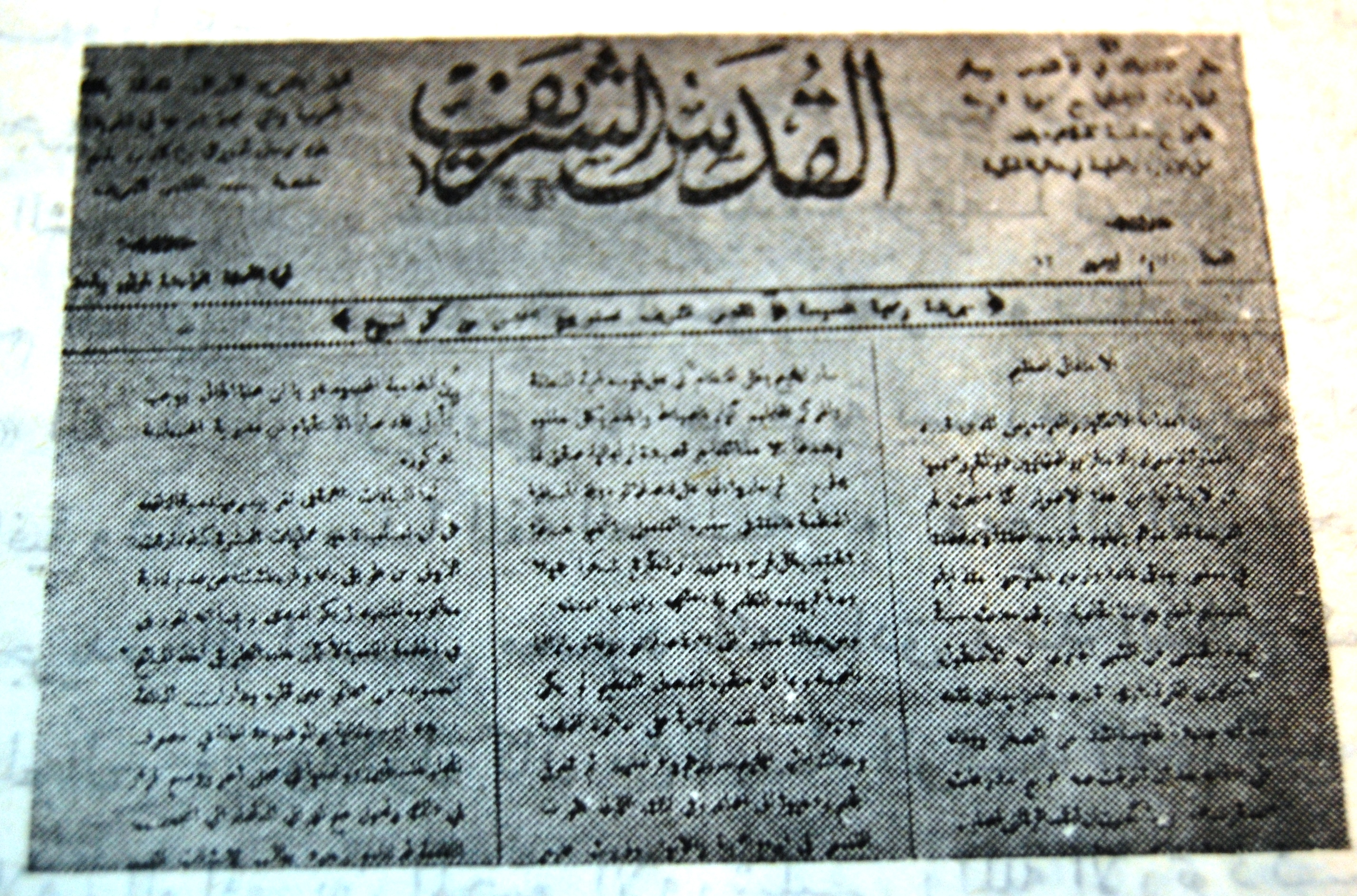
The first Arabic-language Palestinian newspaper was a gazette named Al-Quds Al-Sharif (1867–1908), written in Arabic and Ottoman Turkish

The first Arabic-language newspaper in Palestine was a gazette called Al-Quds Al-Sharif established in 1876, written in Arabic and Ottoman Turkish and edited by Sheikh Ali Rimawi and ‘Abd al-Salam Kamal respectively. It closed shortly after and reopened in 1903. Arabic periodicals only reappeared in Palestine following the 1908 Young Turk Revolution, which lifted press censorship in the empire. About fifteen publications emerged in that year, and another twenty were published before the onset of World War I in 1914. Nearly another 180 were published during the British Mandate for Palestine (1920–1948). However, launching newspapers was easier than sustaining them, as most of these periodicals lasted for a short period of time, especially considering the competition with high quality periodicals from Beirut and Cairo, such as the Egyptian Al-Ahram (The Pyramids).

In 1897 the Printing Workers' Association was established, the first trade union in the region.

=== Early 20th century ===
Three of Palestine's leading Arabic-language newspapers of the pre-World War I era were Al-Quds (Jerusalem) established by Jurji Habib Hanania in Jerusalem in September 1908; Al-Karmil (Carmel after Mount Carmel) in Haifa by Najib Nassar in December 1908; and Falastin (Palestine) by the cousins Issa El-Issa and Yousef El-Issa in Jaffa in January 1911. These three newspapers voiced Arab aspirations and were all published by Palestinian Christians, showing the early role they played in Arab nationalism. In particular, Al-Karmil and Falastin were opposed to Zionism. It was in this early period that the terms "Palestine" and "Palestinians" were being increasingly used by the press.

Leading Palestinian newspapers during the Ottoman period
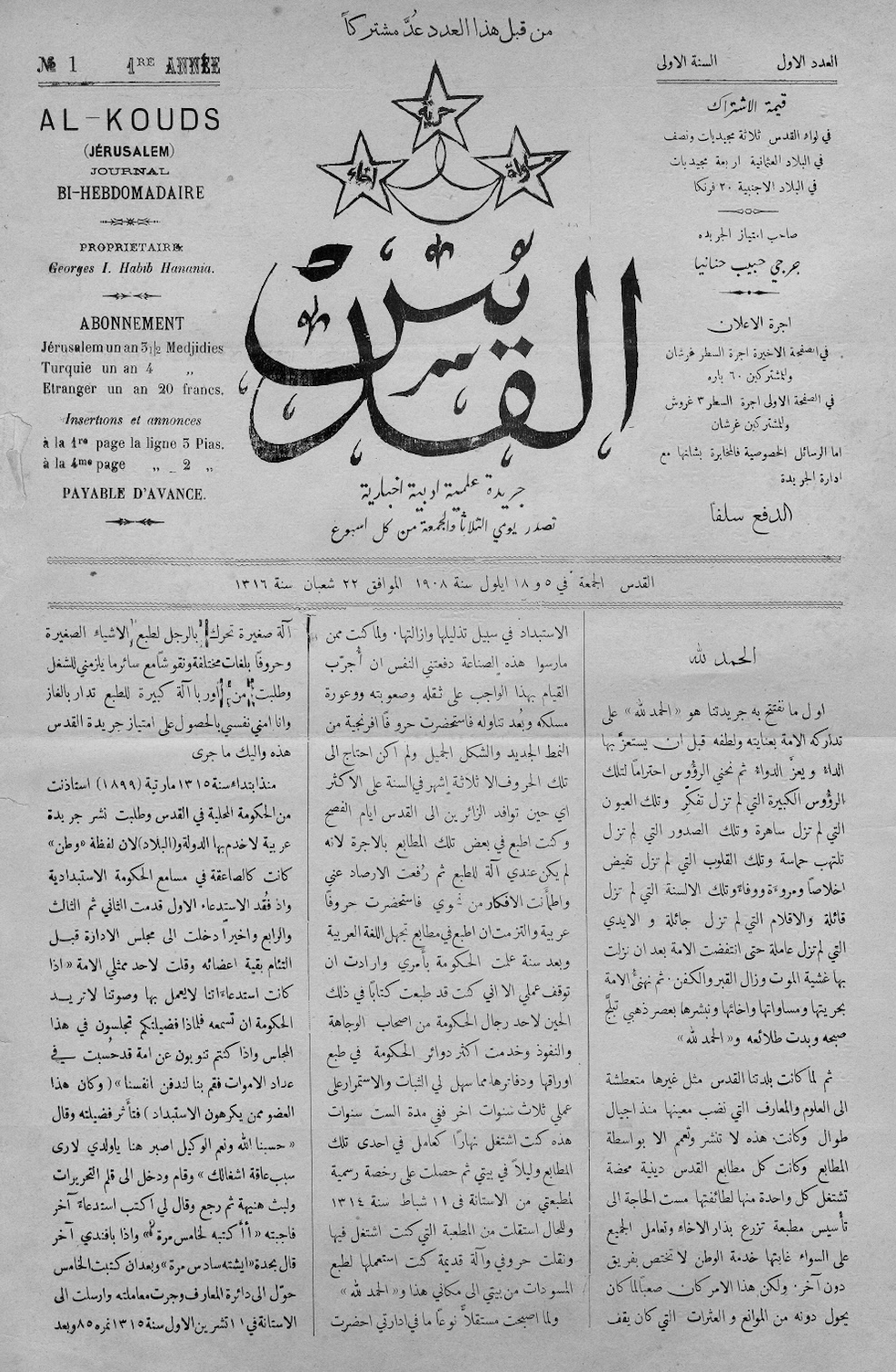
Al-Quds (1908–1914)

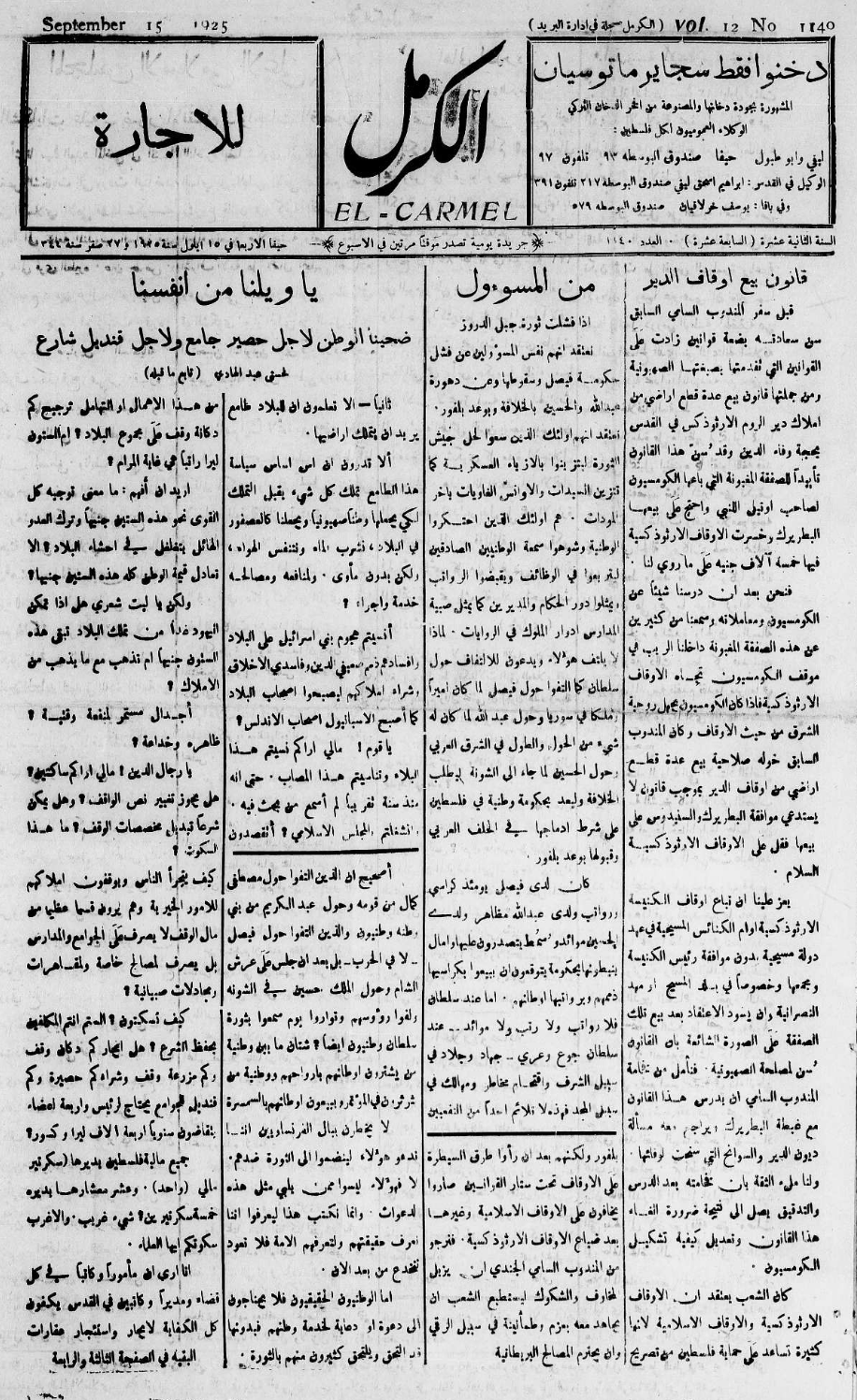
Al-Karmil (1908–1944)

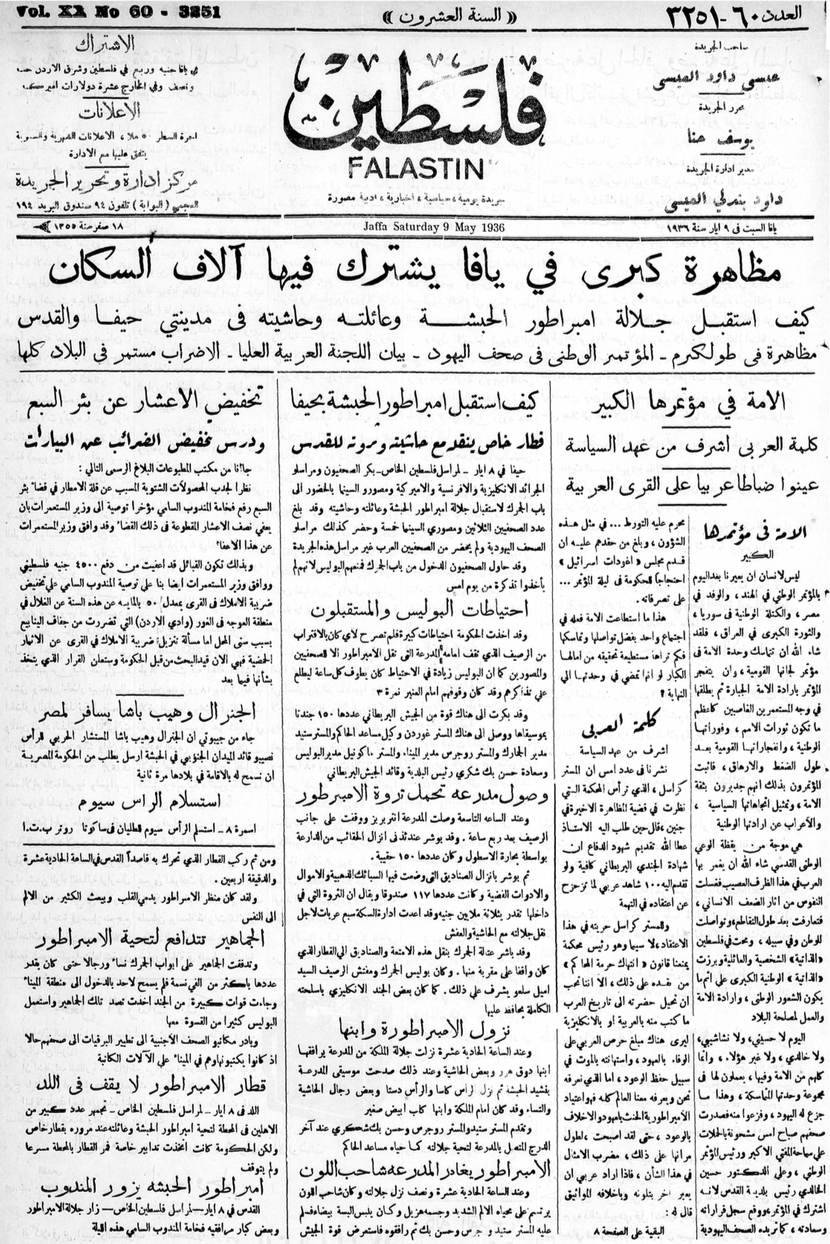
Falastin (1911–1967)

These early Arab Palestinian newspapers saw Ottoman Jews as loyal subjects to the empire, but condemned Zionism, and grew fearful of it due to the waves of European Jewish immigrants to Palestine, who built settlements relying on Jewish labor and excluded Arab ones. Thus, Arab editors began a public awareness campaign, warning that once the Zionist project was fulfilled, the Arab majority and their lands in Palestine would be lost. A common theme in the press of this early period is a criticism directed towards the European Jewish immigrants who failed to integrate, or bother learning Arabic. The Arab editors preferred to raise the issue to the public's attention rather than the Ottoman authorities, so that the public can be active in preventing land sales to Jews, which caused Arab peasants' eviction, and their subsequent loss of work.

The readership of the newspapers in this early period was limited, but it had been expanding. Literacy rates were relatively low; however, social centers where created, such as libraries, the town cafe and the village guesthouse, where men would read aloud articles from newspapers and engage in political discussions. "Newspaper breaks" used to take place in some factories. There was also recorded instances of newspapers sending a copy of their newspaper to villages in the surrounding areas, namely Falastin. Articles from Falastin and Al-Karmil were often reprinted in other local papers and national ones in Beirut, Damascus, and Cairo.

=== Mandate period (1917–1948) ===
Hadashot Ha'aretz front page, 1919

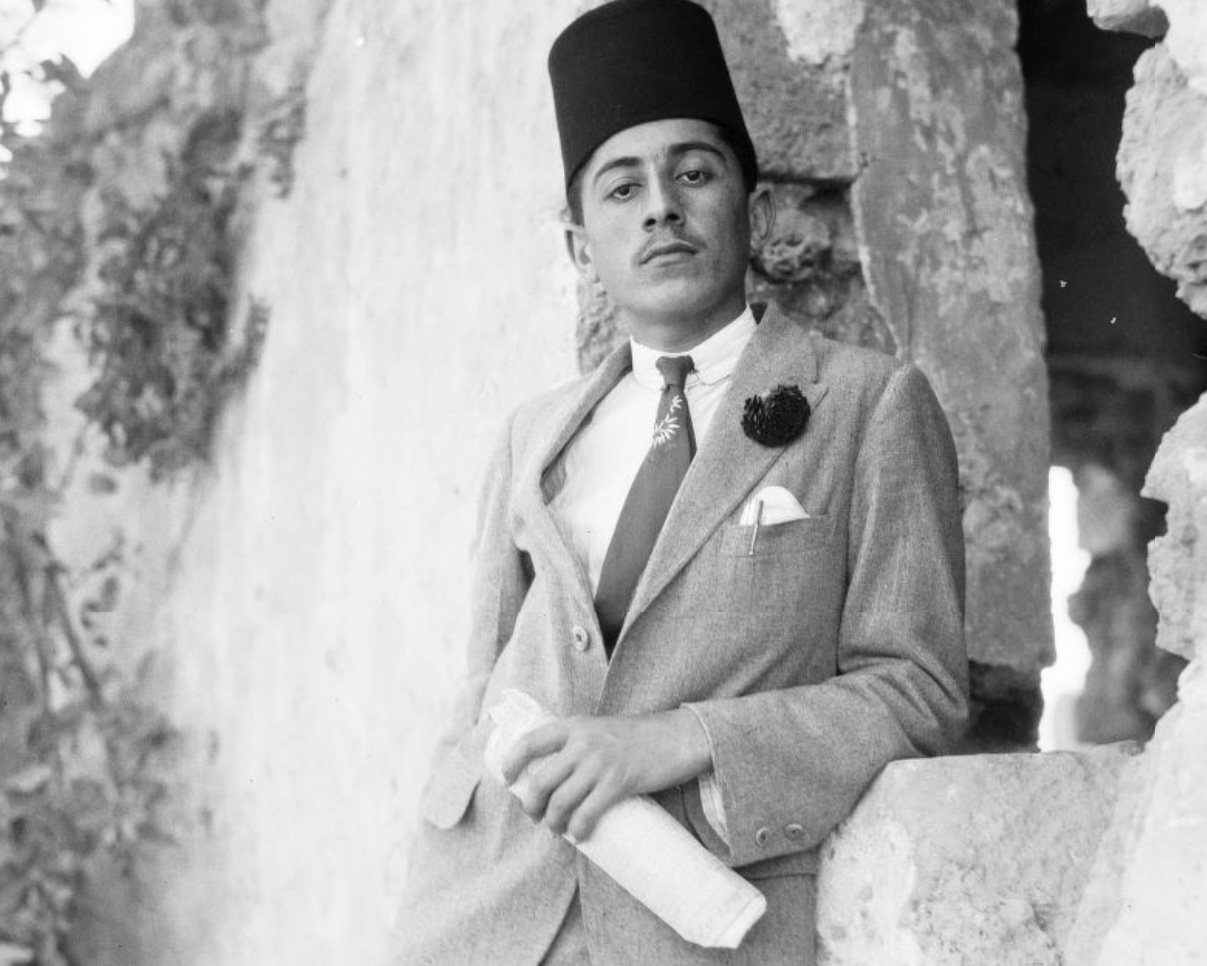
Palestinian Arab man holding a rolled up newspaper, 1921

The Palestinian press was suppressed due to the outbreak of World War I in 1914, and only two main newspapers from the Ottoman period were reopened during the British Mandate, Al-Karmil and Falastin. During the mandate period, the press became more diverse than in the Ottoman period, and reflected different political factions and national consciousness. In 1918, the Haaretz Hebrew-language newspaper, sponsored by the British military government in Palestine, was established in Jerusalem. In 1919, it was taken over by a group of socialist-oriented Zionists, mainly from Russia, including the philanthropist Isaac Leib Goldberg; it was initially called Hadashot Ha'aretz ("News of the Land"). The literary section of the paper attracted leading Hebrew writers of the time.

According to one survey in the mid-1930s, over 250 Arabic newspapers and 65 in other languages were circulating in Mandatory Palestine. The British had adopted the Ottoman Press Law that had mandated for newspapers the licensing of their franchises and the submission of translations of their work to authorities; however, the British did not interfere in the press until the 1929 Palestine riots between Arabs and Jews. The events of that year led to a radicalization of Arab newspapers, and the British changed their initially tolerant position to a more restrictive approach.

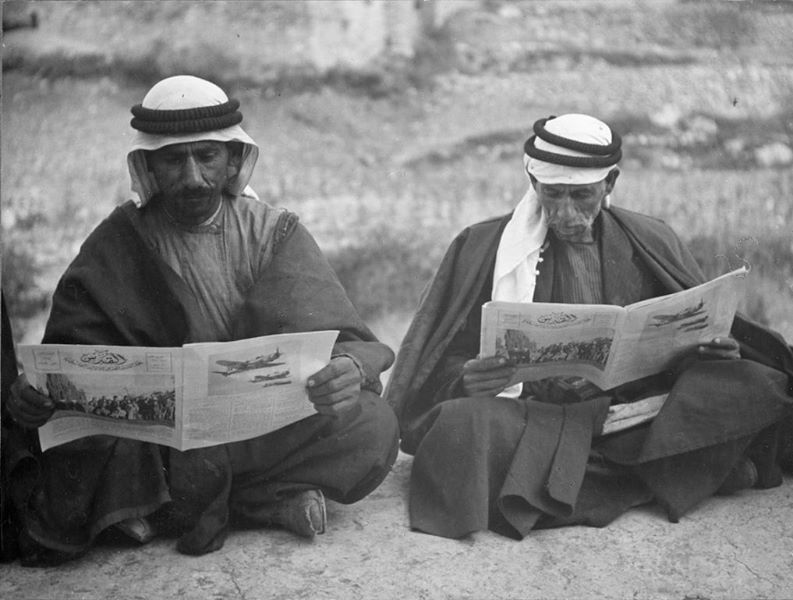
Palestinian Arab men reading the Huna Al-Quds magazine, Jerusalem, Mandatory Palestine in 1940

Most of these publications appeared weekly and the number of copies distributed increased gradually. While most newspapers distributed hundreds of copies each during the Ottoman period, this figure increased to 1,000–1,500 during the Mandate period in the 1920s. Falastin, which was the most popular Palestinian newspaper, sold towards the end of the 1920s around 3,000 copies per issue. In Jerusalem, twenty newspapers were established, mainly Mir'at al-Sharq (Mirror of the East) by Boulos Shehadeh, a Palestinian Christian, in September 1919; and Al-Jami'a Al-'Arabiya (The Arab Union), which was the voice of Palestine's Supreme Muslim Council, by Munif Husseini in December 1927. Around six newspapers were established in Jaffa, in addition to Falastin; twelve in Haifa; and some others in Bethlehem, Gaza and Tulkarem.

In the 1920s, the Hebrew-language Palestinian press, including Haaretz, increasingly moved from Jerusalem to Tel Aviv, whilst the Arabic-language press remained in Jerusalem.

Falastin became the first Palestinian newspaper to succeed in establishing itself as a daily in October 1929, a month after it had started publishing a weekly English-language edition. And the establishment of Al-Difa in April 1934 was considered an important event in the history of Palestinian journalism during the mandate period, as it managed to attract professional journalists from several Arab countries. A rivalry developed between these two largest dailies, Falastin and Al-Difa, which saw improvements in their quality. Al-Difa expanded its readership to the rural and Muslim communities, portraying itself a counterweight to the Christian-owned Falastin. While Falastin aimed to show that it served the whole nation by highlighting how uneducated people enjoyed reading their paper, in an implied criticism towards Al-Difa which had come to rely on intellectuals with a complex writing style. Many weeklies found it difficult to compete with these two dailies.

Leading newspapers during the mandate period
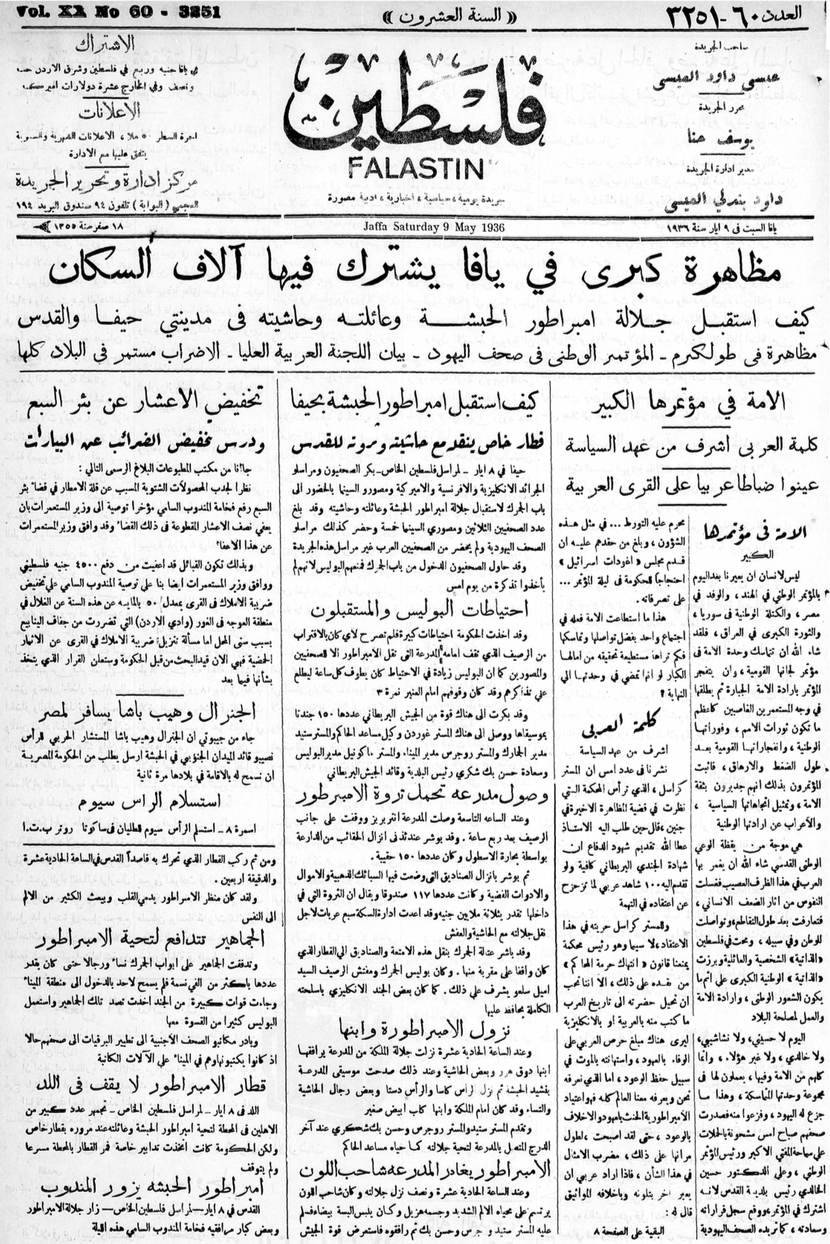
Falastin (1911–1967)

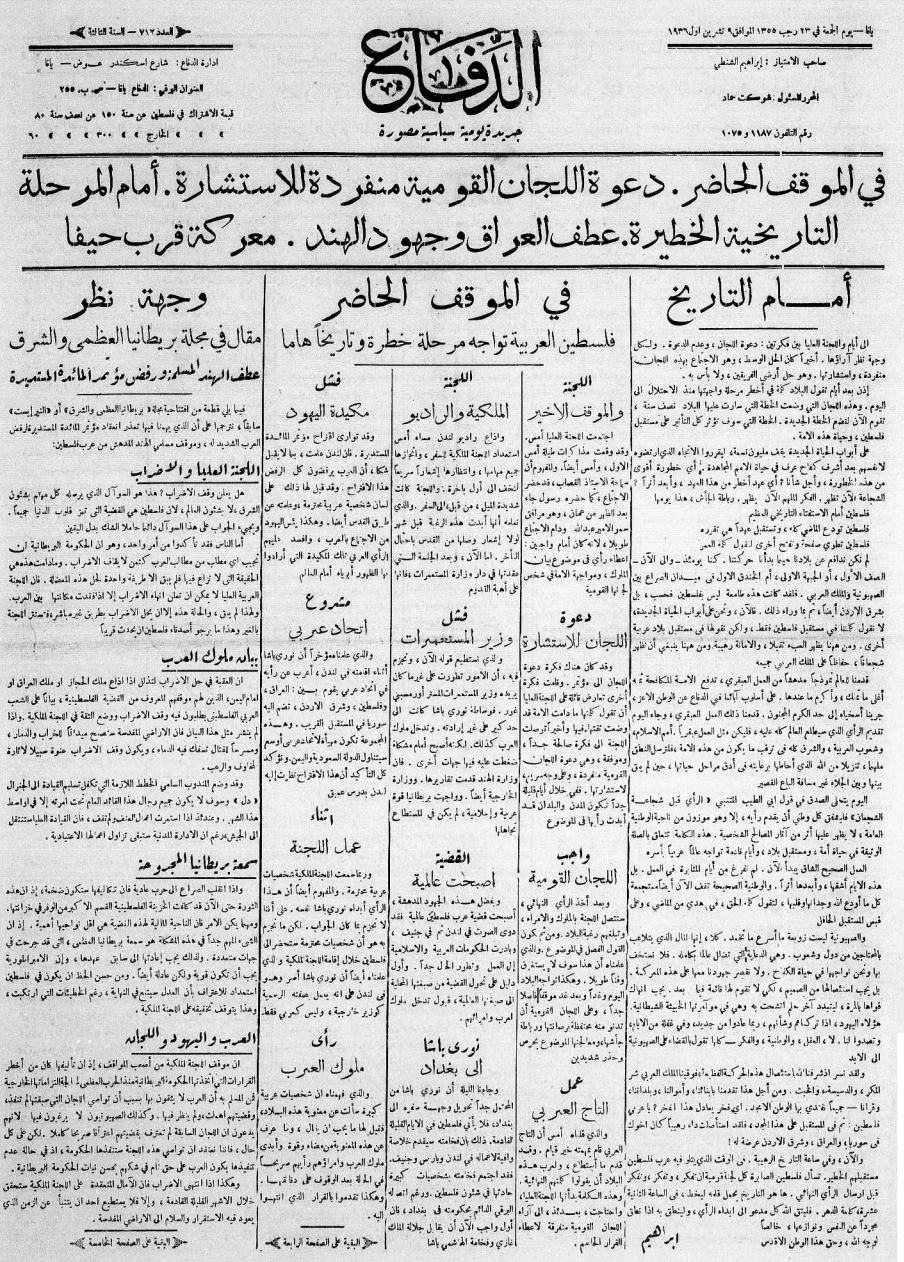
Al-Difa' (1934–1971)

In the 1930s, two outspoken newspapers were established in Jaffa: Al-Jami'a Al-Islamiya (The Islamic Union) in 1932; and Al-Difa' (The Defense) in 1934, which was associated with Hizb Al-Istiqlal (The Independence Party). Al-Liwaa (The Banner) was published in Jerusalem in 1934 by Jamal al-Husayni, who was the leader of the Palestine Arab Party. Many of the editors and owners of newspapers were similarly members of political organizations, and used their publications for mobilizing the public.

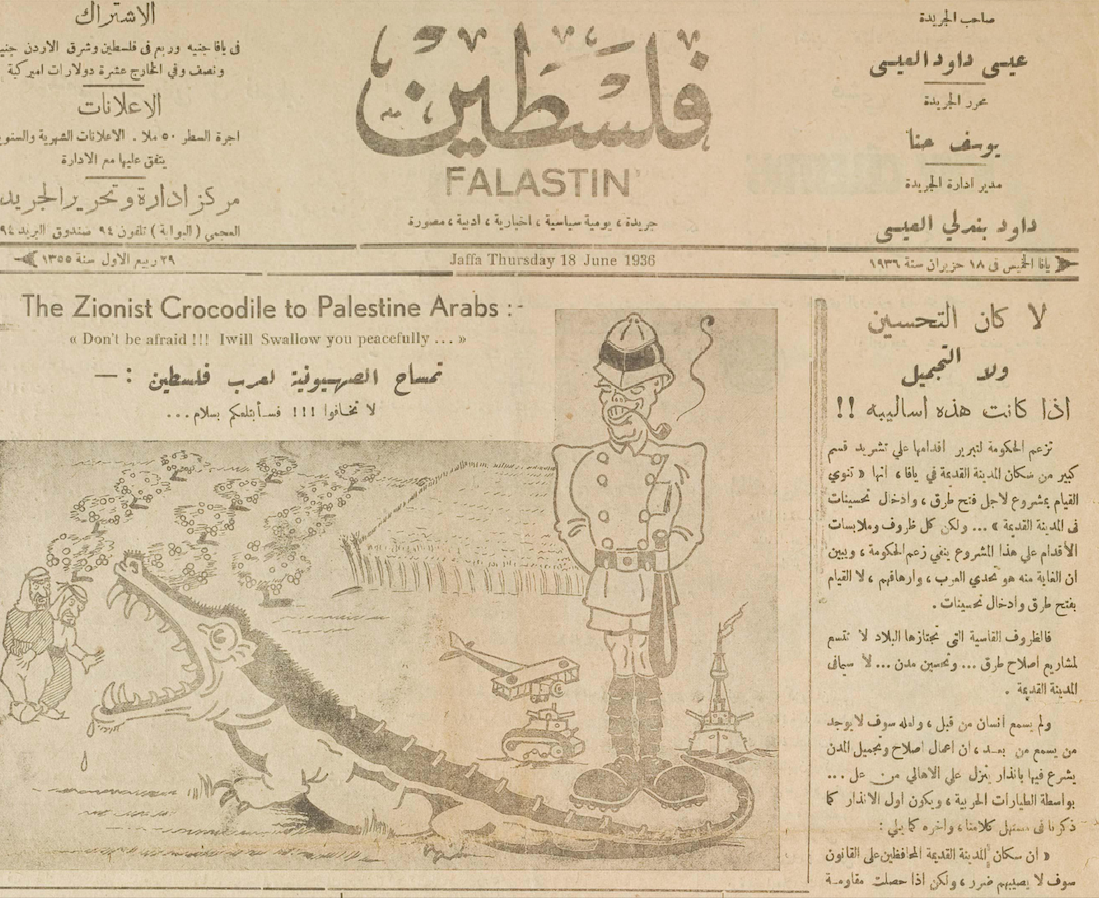
Caricature published by the Falastin newspaper during the 1936–1939 Arab revolt in Palestine, showing Zionism as a crocodile under the protection of a British officer, saying: "Don't be afraid!!! I will swallow you peacefully..."

In 1932, the English-language Palestine Post was established in Jerusalem, a successor to The Palestine Bulletin established by Jacob Landau of the Jewish Telegraphic Agency in 1925. The publication supported the struggle for a Jewish homeland in Palestine and openly opposed British policy restricting Jewish immigration during the Mandate period. According to one commentator, "Zionist institutions considered the newspaper one of the most effective means of exerting influence on the British authorities." In 1950, the Palestine Post was renamed to the Jerusalem Post.

The British authorities issued a new Publications Law and other regulations in 1933 that gave them the authority to suspend newspapers and punish journalists, which restricted freedom of the press. As a result, the use of colloquial writing style by the press intensified, especially during the 1936–1939 Arab revolt in Palestine. Many major publications were suspended for extended periods between 1937 and 1938, including Falastin, Al-Difa, and Al-Liwa. After the outbreak of World War II in 1939, emergency laws were enacted and the British closed almost all the newspapers, except Falastin and Al-Difa, due to the publishing of censored news and the adoption of more moderate positions.

=== Jordanian period (1948–1967) ===
The 1948 Palestine war resulted in the Palestine region being divided between the State of Israel, the West Bank which was annexed by Jordan in 1950, and the Gaza Strip controlled by Egypt. Much of the Arab community was forced to flee the new State of Israel, which forced the Arabic-language newspapers Falastin and Al-Difa to move from Jaffa to East Jerusalem. Another newspaper called Al-Jihad was established in East Jerusalem in 1953. Thus these three East Jerusalem-based newspapers became Jordan's press for many years.

Leading newspapers during the Jordanian period
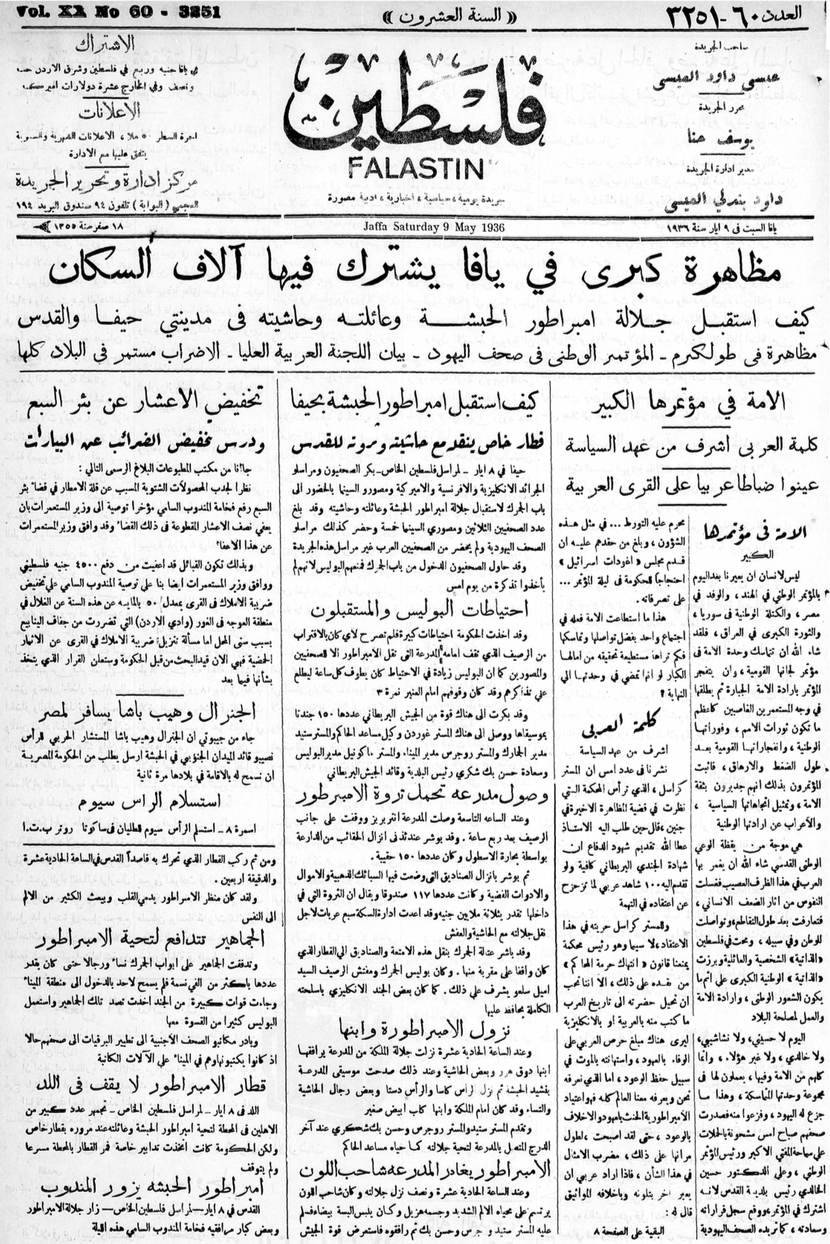
Falastin (1911–1967)

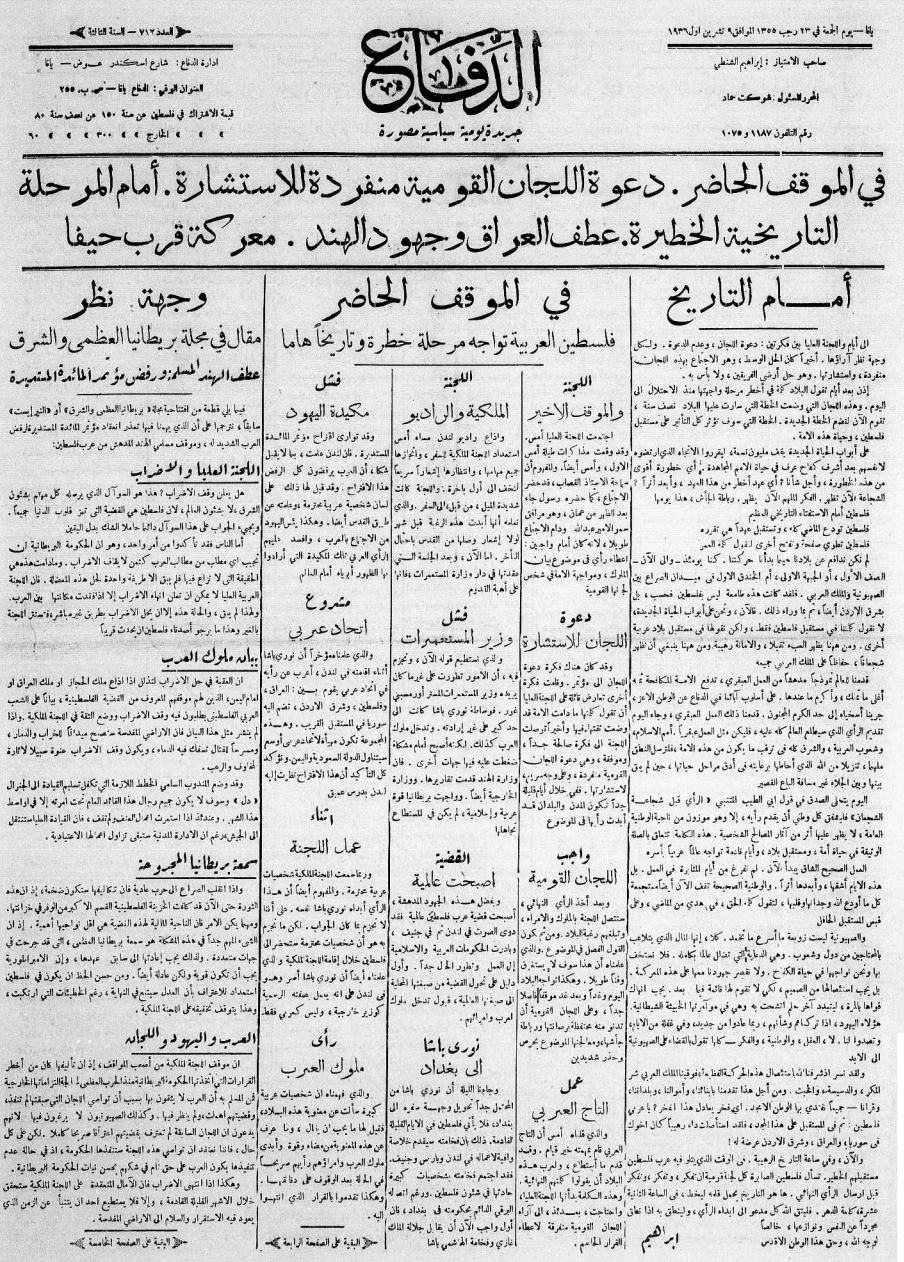
Al-Difa' (1934–1971)

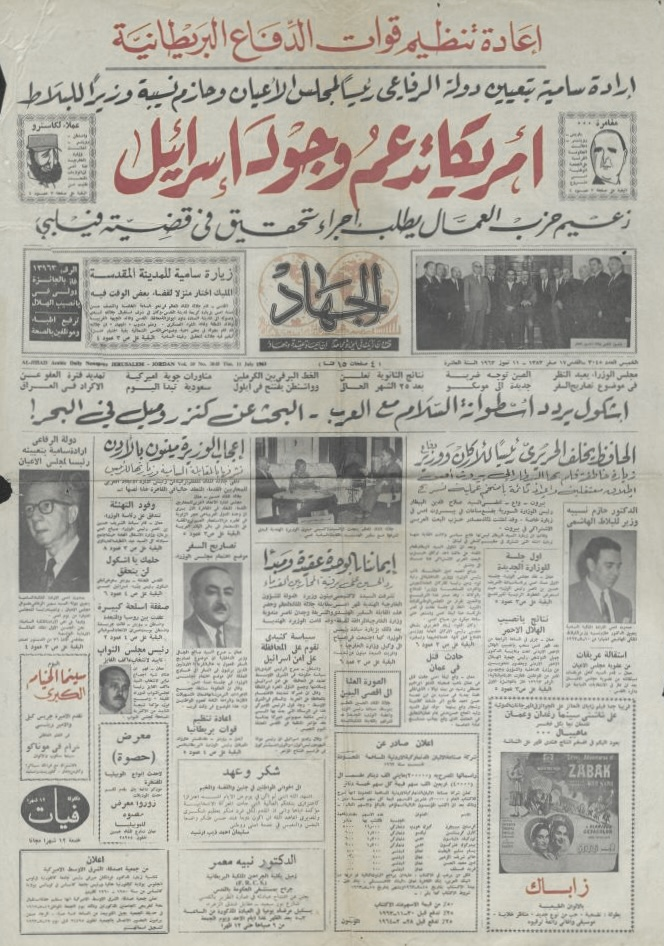
Al-Jihad (1953–1967)

In the 1950s, a number of newspapers were established as affiliates of political parties that were being created in Jordan, including: Al-Raya (The Banner) affiliated with Hizb ut-Tahrir (Liberation Party) in 1953, which was suspended after 13 issues; and Al-Ba'th (The Renaissance) affiliated with the Jordanian Arab Socialist Ba'ath Party, which lasted from 1949 to 1954. An anti-communist law issued in 1953 banned leftist publications by the Jordanian Communist Party. Furthermore, the prevalence of anti-Jordanian propaganda in Egyptian newspapers in the 1950s led to its ban in Jordan.

The Jordanian government of Wasfi Tal issued a new Press and Publications Law in early 1967 that forced the merger of Al-Difa and Al-Jihad to produce Jerusalem-based Al-Quds (not to be confused with the newspaper of the same name 1908–1914); and the merger of Falastin and Al-Manar to produce Amman-based Ad-Dustour (The Constitution); both of these newspapers are still published to this day. Ad-Dustour and Al-Difa' newspapers were both briefly suspended during Black September in 1970 after having published a Palestine Liberation Organization statement that cast blame on Jordan's government for the conflict. As a result of the events of Black September and low wages paid to journalists, many professionals of Palestinian origin moved to Arab Gulf states.

=== Current period (1967–present) ===
The 1967 Six Day War saw Israel occupying the West Bank and the Gaza Strip. Under Israeli occupation, Palestinian newspapers fell under Israeli military censorship, and suffered financial hardships. Between 1967 and 1987, 22 newspapers and 20 magazines were published in the territories, which gave priority to issues resulting from the Israeli occupation over cultural, social, and artistic topics. The outbreak of the First Intifada against the occupation in 1987, saw international media interest for extended periods, leading to them hiring aspiring Palestinian journalists. Private Arabic newspapers also began appearing in Nazareth by Palestinian citizens of Israel, including Al-Sinnarah (The Hook) and Kul al-Arab (All the Arabs) and in 1983 and 1987 respectively.

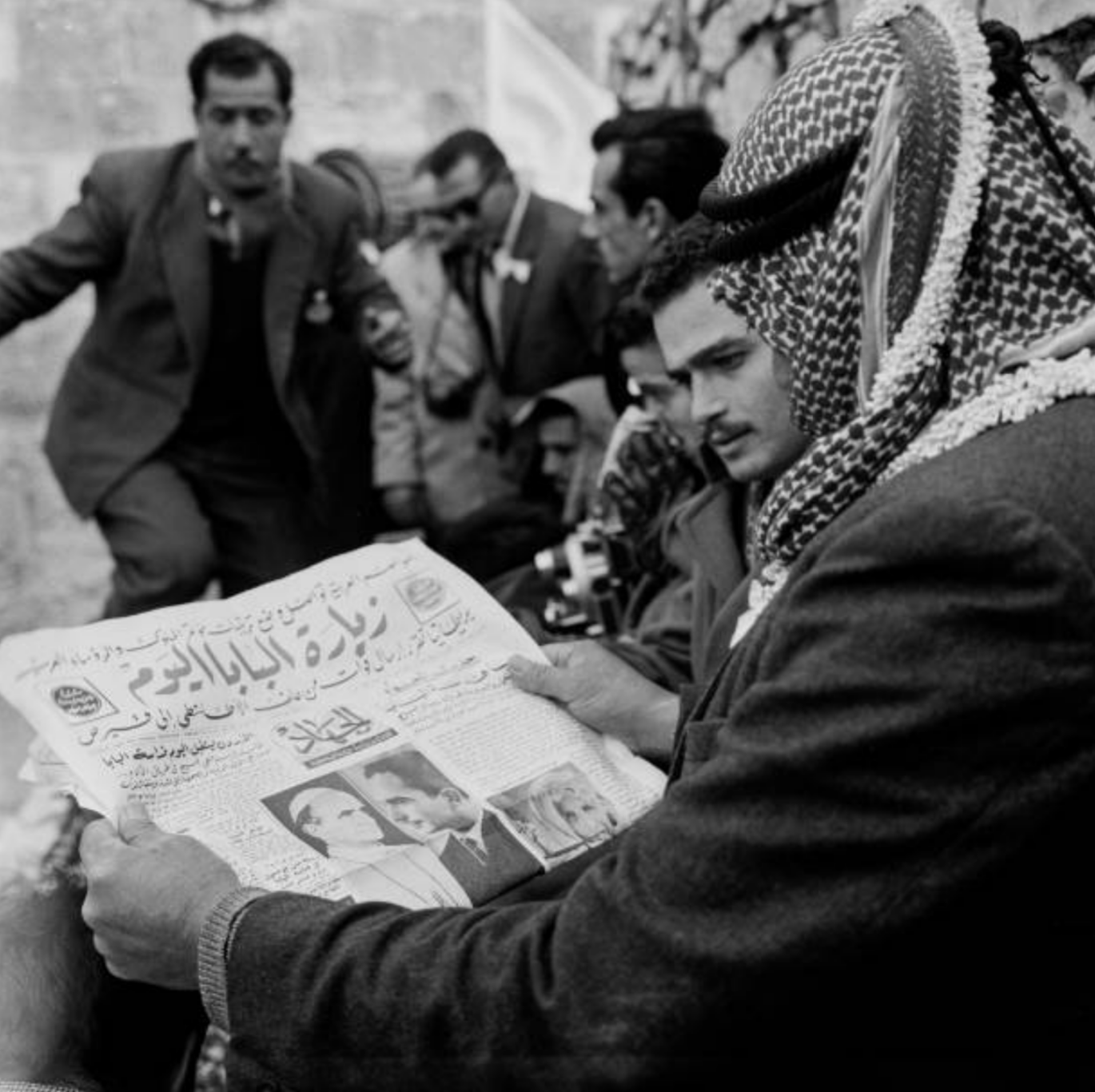
Jordanian soldier reading Al-Jihad newspaper reporting on Pope Paul VI's visit to Jordan in East Jerusalem, 1964

In the wake of the peace process, namely the 1993 Oslo Accords, the Palestinian National Authority was established that year, bringing an end to Israeli military censorship, when a Palestinian Press Law replaced the Israeli military regulations. Subsequently, many newspapers were established such as the Ramallah-based Al-Hayat Al-Jadida (The New Life) in 1994 and Al-Ayyam (The Days) in 1995. The new newspapers covered topics to include discussions about women's rights, honor crimes, and criticisms of social customs. The lifting of Israeli military censorship also allowed Palestinians to increasingly demand for their right of return.

Al-Quds, Al-Hayat Al-Jadida, and Al-Ayyam are the three main newspapers circulating in the Palestinian territories today. While Al-Quds is privately owned, it is still associated with the Palestinian Authority (PA), and both Al-Ayyam and Al-Hayat Al-Jadida are fully affiliated with the PA. In the Gaza Strip, which is controlled by Hamas, there are two newspapers published there, Felesteen (Palestine) established in 2006 and Al-Resalah (The Letter). Other groups such as the Palestinian Islamic Jihad publishes its own Al-Istiqlal (The Independence), while the Democratic Front for the Liberation of Palestine publishes Al-Masar (The Path).

As of 2021, there are more than 50 online and print newspapers circulating in Palestine. Journalism in Palestine today suffers from restrictions imposed by the Palestinian Authority's Cyber Crimes Law enacted in 2017.

=== Archives ===
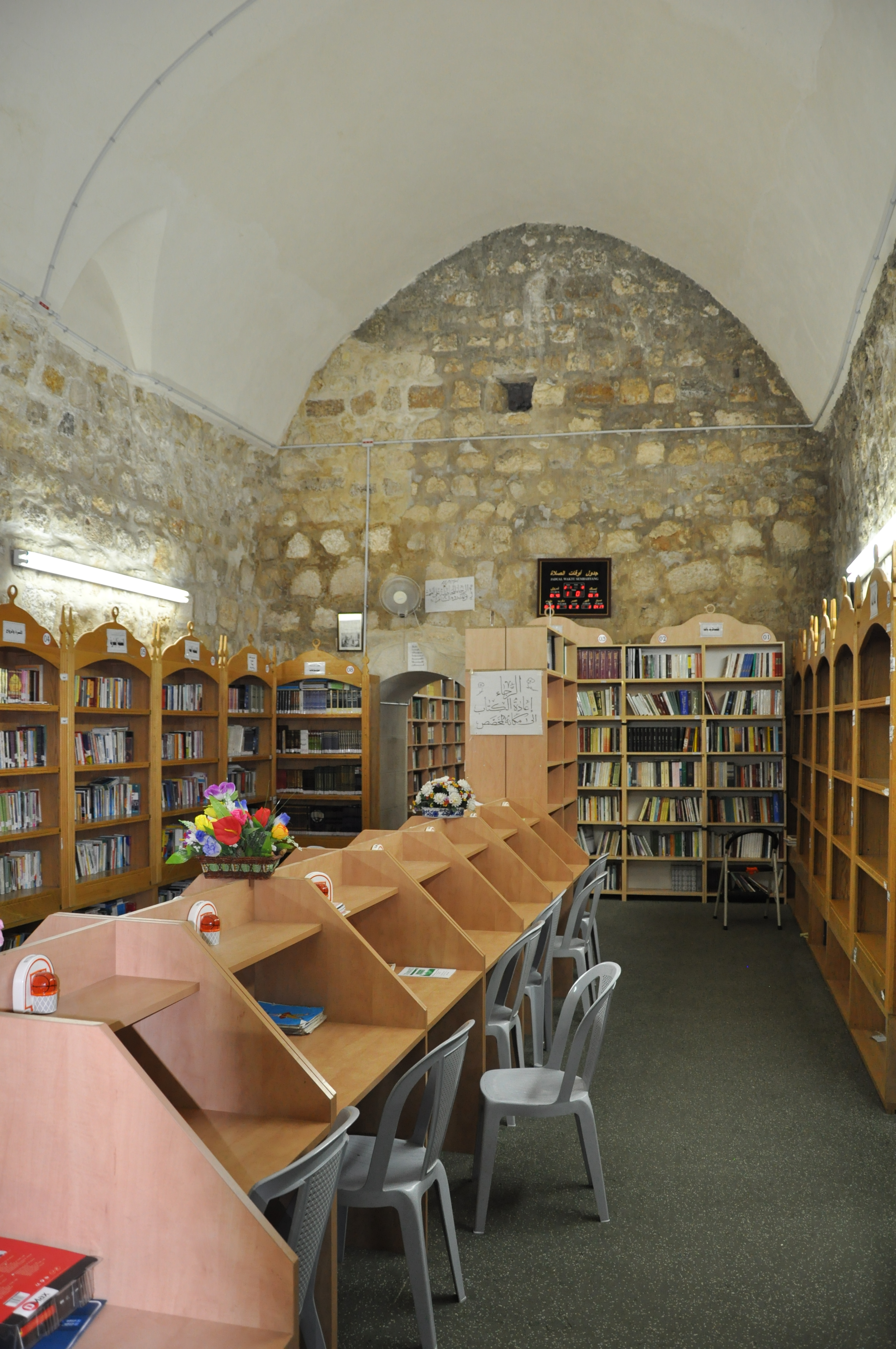
Interior of al-Khutniyya Library, part of the al-Aqsa Library system

Al-Aqsa Library located in the Old City of East Jerusalem in the Israeli-occupied West Bank has more than seventy Arabic newspapers, magazines, and journals published in Palestine, in addition to ones that were published in other Arab countries and by Arab communities in Europe, and South and North America. The library in some instances holds the only copy available in the region. The National Library of Israel's Jarayed collection of Arabic newspapers in the Ottoman and British periods is available online.

=== Historiography ===
Palestinian-American historian Rashid Khalidi wrote in his book titled The Hundred Years' War on Palestine:

One crucial window into Palestinians' perceptions of themselves and their understanding of events between the wars is the Palestinian press. Two newspapers, Issa El-Issa's Jaffa publication, Falastin, and Al-Karmil, published in Haifa by Najib Nassar, were bastions of local patriotism, and critics of the Zionist-British entente and the danger that it posed to the Arab majority in Palestine. They were among the most influential beacons of the idea of Palestinian identity.

== Digital and citizen journalism ==
Print newspapers have been challenged by the rise of digital and citizen journalism. The rise of the internet in the 1990s gave Palestinians a new platform to share their narrative digitally, which they thought was being ignored by mainstream media. In 1999, the Palestine Chronicle website was founded by Ramzy Baroud, a Palestinian-American. A year later after the outbreak of the Second Intifada, Ali Abunimah, another Palestinian-American, and others founded the Chicago-based The Electronic Intifada English website, targeting western audiences. While locally, Shehab News Agency was established in 2007 and Quds News Network in 2013, providing Arabic, and sometimes English, content for young and global audiences on social media, drawing millions of followers.

Palestinian young citizens have been filming, creating and distributing videos showing Israeli settler violence, Israeli military violations, and the realities of living under Israeli occupation. Human Rights Watch has documented a "systematic censorship" campaign by social media companies like Meta Platforms, which owns Facebook and Instagram, which has targeted accounts of Palestinian activists, including journalists, through bans and limiting their content's reach.

The ongoing Gaza war, which started on 7 October 2023, saw a steep increase in the social media following of Palestinian journalists based in the Gaza Strip, including Motaz Azaiza and Plestia Alaqad, whose accounts, particularly on Instagram and TikTok, have swelled to millions of followers due to their documentation of the war as very few foreign journalists were allowed into the strip. Notably, in 2023 journalist and influencer Bisan Owda won a Peabody Award for her TikTok series It’s Bisan from Gaza and I’m Still Alive.

== Broadcast journalism ==
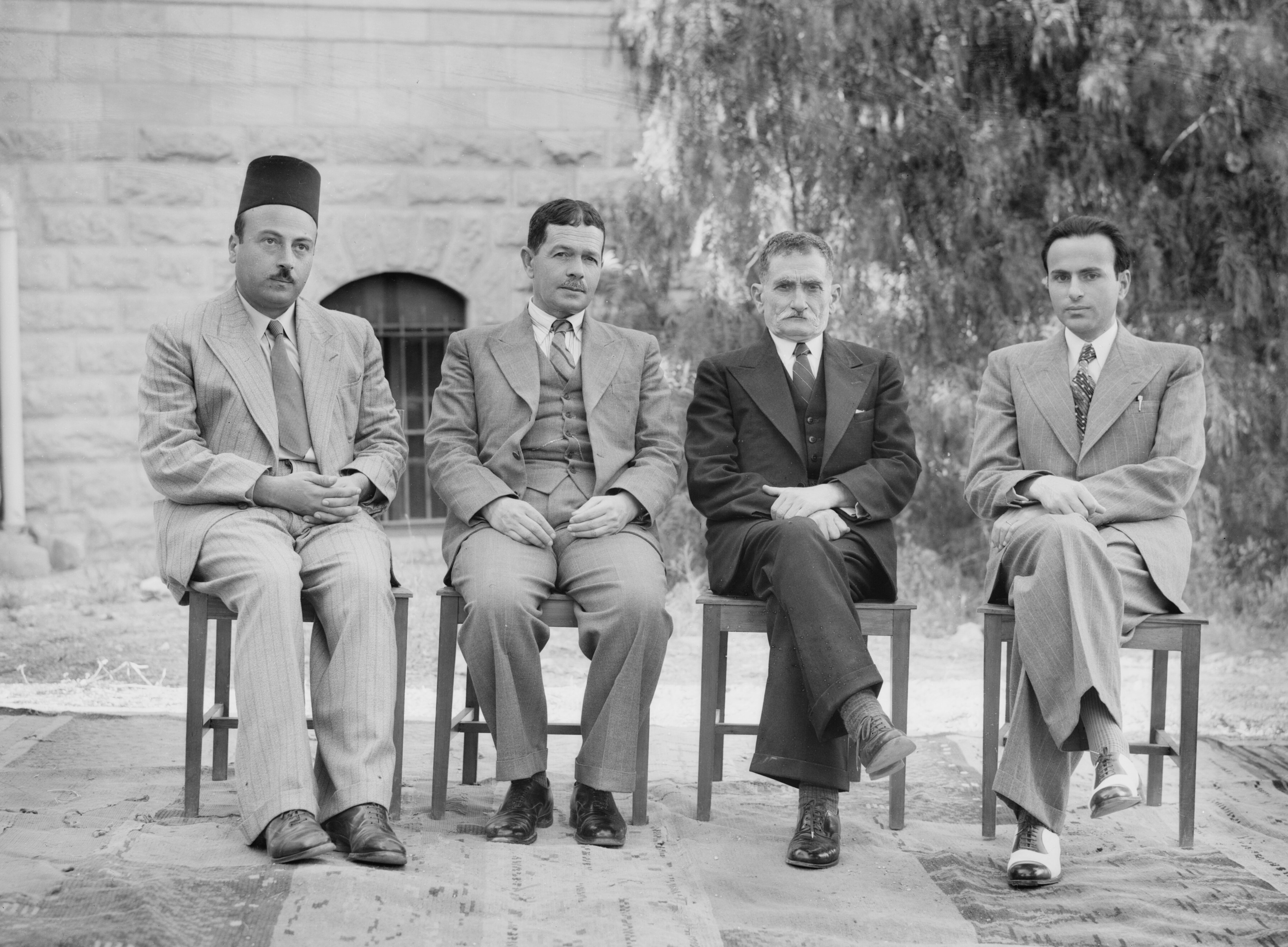
Palestinian Arab staff at the Palestine Broadcasting Service studios in Jerusalem, Mandatory Palestine in 1941

The British authorities established the region's first radio station named Palestine Broadcasting Service (PBS) in 1936 to compete with the politicized print journalism. PBS' studios were located in Jerusalem, while the tower and transmitter were located in Ramallah. It aired broadcasts in Arabic, English and Hebrew. The studios in Jerusalem were taken over by Zionist militias during the 1948 Palestine war, while the tower and transmitter in Ramallah were taken over by Jordan, which added a studio and launched the Hashemite Broadcasting Service (HBS) throughout its administration of the West Bank until 1967.

After Israel occupied the West Bank and the Gaza Strip in 1967, it banned broadcasting in the occupied territories, which remained without a national television or radio station until the 1990s. The signing of the Oslo Accords in 1993 allowed for the first time the then newly established Palestinian Authority to access ten FM frequencies, and led to the establishment of Palestinian Broadcasting Corporation (PBC) that year, including PBC's Voice of Palestine radio station. Hamas' victory in the 2006 Palestinian legislative election led to the establishment of Al Aqsa TV and its radio station Sawt Al-Aqsa.

== Safety of journalists ==
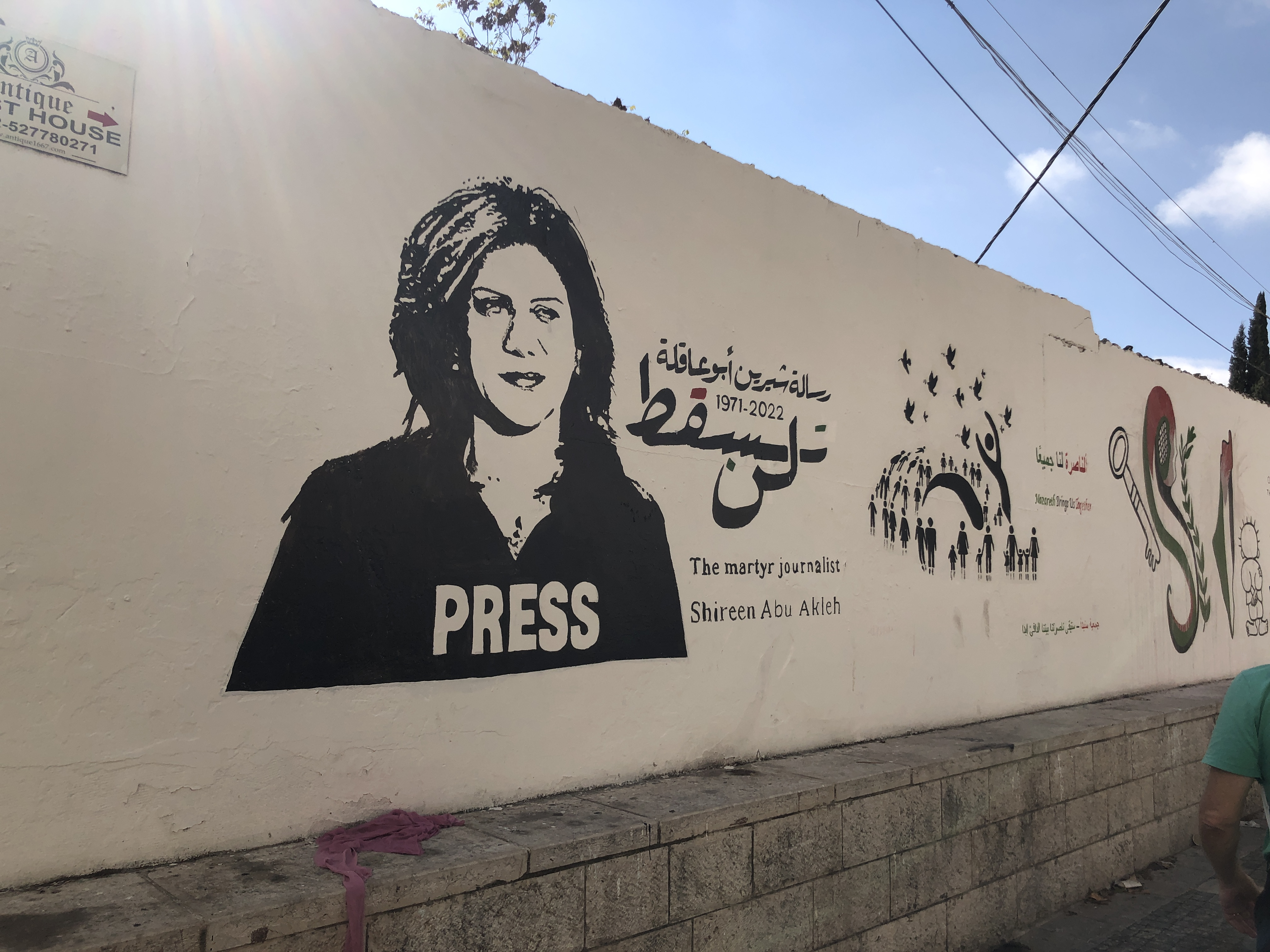
Graffiti of Al Jazeera reporter Shireen Abu Akleh in Nazareth who was killed by the Israeli military in 2022 and is widely considered an icon of Palestinian journalism

The period of the Second Intifada between 2000 and 2005 put Palestinian journalists and camera operators at heightened risks, including military closures, confiscation of equipment, prevention from reporting on certain incidents and locations, curfews, and arrests. The Committee to Protect Journalists documented that nine Palestinian journalists were killed by the Israeli military between 2000 and 2009, some of them were described as targeted attacks, which Israel denies. The killing of Palestinian-American journalist and Al Jazeera reporter by the Israeli military, Shireen Abu Akleh, in 2022 gained widespread coverage globally; she is widely considered an icon of Palestinian journalism.

Record numbers of arrests of Palestinian journalists in 2023 by the Israeli military in the Israeli-occupied West Bank, where journalists face risk of assault by the Israeli and Palestinian law enforcements and from attacks by Israeli settlers. The Gaza Strip meanwhile, which has been under Israeli blockade since 2007, is considered to be one of the "most perilous places" to be a journalist, according to the committee to Protect Journalists. Since the beginning of the Gaza war, which broke out on 7 October 2023, many dozens of Palestinian journalists have been killed by Israel; 70% of journalists killed worldwide in 2023 have been Palestinian. Many of the deaths have been caused by Israeli airstrikes.

== See also ==
- History of newspaper publishing in the Arab world
- List of journalists killed during the Israeli-Palestinian conflict
- List of journalists killed in the Gaza war
- Category:Palestinian Internet celebrities

== Bibliography ==
- Abu Harb, Qasem (2015). "12. Digitisation of Islamic manuscripts and periodicals in Jerusalem and Acre". From Dust to Digital: Ten Years of the Endangered Archives Programme. Open Book Publishers. pp. 377–416. doi:10.11647/obp.0052.12. ISBN 978-1-78374-062-8.
- Brown, Nathan J. (2003). Palestinian Politics After the Oslo Accords: Resuming Arab Palestine. University of California Press. ISBN 978-0-520-23762-9. Archived from the original on 6 April 2024.
- Davidovitch, Nitza; Lewin, Eyal, eds. (2019). Israel from the Outside and Inside: Israeli Politics and "Alien" Media. Cambridge Scholars Publishing. ISBN 978-1-5275-3062-1.
- Dowty, Alan (2019). Arabs and Jews in Ottoman Palestine: Two Worlds Collide. Indiana University Press. ISBN 978-0-253-03866-1.
- Endong, Floribert Patrick C. (31 March 2018). Exploring the Role of Social Media in Transnational Advocacy. IGI Global. ISBN 978-1-5225-2855-5. Archived from the original on 7 April 2024.
- Gaztambide-Fernández, Rubén; Matute, Alexandra Arráiz, eds. (29 June 2020). Cultural Production and Participatory Politics: Youth, Symbolic Creativity, and Activism. Routledge. ISBN 978-1-000-65146-1. Archived from the original on 7 April 2024.
- Lawson, Fred H. (2018). "Falastin: An Experiment in Promoting Palestinian Nationalism through the English-language Press". In Gorman, Anthony; Monciaud, Didier (eds.). The Press in the Middle East and North Africa. Edinburgh University Press. pp. 126–150. ISBN 978-1-4744-3064-7. Archived from the original on 3 April 2024.
- Josephi, Beate Ursula (2010). Journalism Education in Countries with Limited Media Freedom. Peter Lang. ISBN 978-1-4331-1084-9. Archived from the original on 2023-04-14.
- Meyers, O.; Neiger, M.; Zandberg, E., eds. (12 August 2014). Communicating Awe: Media Memory and Holocaust Commemoration. Springer. ISBN 978-1-137-32524-2.
- Kabha, Mustafa (2007). The Palestinian Press as Shaper of Public Opinion 1929-39. Vallentine Mitchell. ISBN 978-0-85303-672-2.
- Khalidi, Rashid (28 January 2020). The Hundred Years' War on Palestine: A History of Settler Colonialism and Resistance, 1917–2017. Metropolitan Books. ISBN 978-1-62779-854-9. Archived from the original on 6 November 2023.
- Khamis, Lina Edward (30 April 2018). Cultural Policy in Jordan: System, Process, and Policy. Springer. Archived from the original on 2 April 2024.
- Michael, Suheir (1 December 2007). Identity in Palestinian Literature: Exile is the Antithesis of Home (PhD in Politics thesis). San Francisco State University. Archived from the original on 15 January 2023.
- Abualrob, Mohammed; Alkhayyat, Diana (2014). "Case 2: Palestine—New Media, Same Old Political Agenda". In Kalyango, Yusuf; Mould, D. (eds.). Global Journalism Practice and New Media Performance. Springer. pp. 38–49. Archived from the original on 6 April 2024.
- Regan, Bernard (30 October 2018). The Balfour Declaration: Empire, the Mandate and Resistance in Palestine. Verso Books. Archived from the original on 31 March 2024.
- Richter, Carola; Kozman, Claudia, eds. (3 March 2021). Arab Media Systems. Open Book Publishers. Archived from the original on 7 April 2024.
- Rugh, William A. (28 February 2004). Arab Mass Media: Newspapers, Radio, and Television in Arab Politics. Bloomsbury Publishing USA.
- Stein, Rebecca (1 June 2021). Screen Shots: State Violence on Camera in Israel and Palestine. Stanford University Press. ISBN 978-1-5036-2803-8.
- Wermenbol, Grace (27 May 2021). A Tale of Two Narratives. Cambridge University Press. ISBN 978-1-108-84028-6.
