= List of newspapers in Palestine =

This is a list of notable newspapers in or about Palestine:

- Al Ayyam, the second-largest circulation daily newspaper in Palestine
- Al Difa, a newspaper published between 1934 and 1948
- Falastin, based in Jaffa and later East Jerusalem from 1911 to 1967
- Felestin, the largest circulation daily newspaper in the Gaza Strip
- Gaza Weekly Newspaper, a weekly newspaper operating out of Gaza
- Al-Hayat al-Jadida, official daily newspaper of the Palestinian National Authority
- Al-Hurriya, political newspaper affiliated with the DFLP (Democratic Front for the Liberation of Palestine)
- Al Jamia Al Arabiya, a daily newspaper published between 1927 and 1935
- Lisan Al Arab, a newspaper in Jerusalem published between 1921 and 1925
- Palestine–Israel Journal, an independent, non-profit, Jerusalem based newspaper published quarterly
- The Palestine Telegraph, first online newspaper based in the Gaza Strip
- Palestine Times, the only English-language daily Palestinian newspaper from 2006 to 2007
- This Week in Palestine, a monthly magazine that covers cultural, social, and, political issues in Palestine
- Al-Quds, a daily newspaper based in Jerusalem
- Al-Quds Al-Arabi, an independent pan-Arab daily newspaper, published in London and owned by Palestinian expatriates
- Mir'at al-Sharq, a newspaper in Jerusalem during the 1920s that favored political commentary
