= Sadhij Nassar =

Palestinian activist and journalist

Sadhij Nassar (born Baha'i; 1900–1970) was a Palestinian activist and journalist. She is known for her work on the newspaper Al-Karmil with her husband, Najib Nassar, and for being the first Palestinian woman taken as a political prisoner under the British Mandate. In 2022, Middle East Eye described her as one of 'the most prominent Palestinian feminists'.

== Personal life ==
Sadhij Nassar was born in Haifa when it was part of the Ottoman Empire. Her grandfather was the founder of the Baha'i faith, Baháʼu'lláh. Her father was his son, Mírzá Badíʻu'lláh Effendí. She attended and graduated from the Sisters of Nazareth School in Haifa.

In 1927, she married Najib Nassar, who had been her Arabic teacher. He was thirty years older than her and she was his second wife. The couple had one son together. Nassar could speak four languages.

Following the Nakba in 1948, Nassar and her son moved to Lebanon, her husband having died at the end of the previous year. Later, she moved to Damascus in Syria, where she died in 1970.

== Career ==
=== Al-Karmil ===
Al-Karmil newspaper was founded by Najib Nassar in 1908. From the 1920s, Nassar worked with her husband to run the paper, acting as an editor, journalist and administrator. She was the editor of the paper from 1941 until its closure in 1944 when the British Mandate authorities invoked emergency protocols to close the newspaper's offices permanently.

==== The Women's Section ====
In 1926, Nassar introduced "The Women's Section" to Al-Karmil and acted as the section's editor. Both men and women contributed to the section. Nassar used her writing to oppose British and Zionist colonisation and to encourage women to engage politically. For example, she encouraged Palestinian mothers to raise their children equally, regardless of gender, and all Palestinian women to work in order to support economic independence. Nassar also advocated from the role of women in resisting colonial violence. In the late 1920s, Nassar argued that, 'You are responsible. Yes, you Palestinian Arab ladies, Muslim and Christian, you are responsible for the integrity of the nation (its "watan") and keeping Palestine Arab as it was until now. Every woman will spread the spirit of cooperation among the sons of the Arabs in the souls of her children.' Ellen Fleischmann describes Nassar's journalistic work between 1926 and 1933 as a kind of 'one-woman press', covering a wide range of topics on local, regional and global levels.

=== Political work ===
==== Advocacy for Women's Rights ====
===== Arab Women's Union =====
Nassar co-founded the Arab Women's Union in Haifa in 1930, alongside Mariam al-Khalil. The Union played an important role in the 1936 General Strike, during which Nassar participated in demonstrations as part of the group. Nassar believed in the importance of organising rural women and the contribution they could make to the national struggle. Despite her efforts, she struggled to sustainably organise the women farmers in the Baysan district.

===== The Eastern Women's Conference for the Defence of Palestine =====
In October 1938, Nassar was invited to attend the Eastern Women's Conference for the Defence of Palestine in Cairo, hosted by the Egyptian Feminist Union (EFU), by its founder Huda Sharawi. The EFU was founded in 1923 and worked to create gender equality in Egypt as well as to connect feminist organisations and activists across the Arab world. The conference demanded an end to British Mandate rule and for the creation of the state of Palestine. Nassar was elected secretary of the conference bureau. The Palestinian women's delegation contributed to the conference by giving speeches about unity among Arabs and the importance of collective action against colonisation.

===== The General Congress of Arab Women =====
In 1944, Nassar attended the General Congress of Arab Women, another conference held by the EFU. The conference was held at the Cairo Opera House. Nassar gave a speech calling on attendees to take active steps to save Palestine before time ran out.

==== Political Imprisonment ====
In late 1938, Nassar was arrested by the British Mandate authorities. She was charged with supplying arms to Palestinian resistance forces. Other Palestinian women were also accused of hiding weapons in their cars and homes. She was the first Palestinian woman to be taken as a political prisoner by the British Mandate authorities. From March 1939, she was held in administrative detention under Defense Emergency Regulations. She was imprisoned in a Bethlehem prison for eleven months. Her husband, Najib, formed part of a local and international campaign for Nassar's release, writing a letter saying that if his newspaper did not secure his place in the history books, his relationship to his wife would.

=== In Lebanon ===
After moving to Lebanon, Nassar continued to work as a journalist, publishing articles in the newspaper al-Yawm.

=== In Syria ===
Once living in Damascus, Nassar wrote articles for Syrian newspapers including al-Qabas.

== Legacy ==
Nassar is mentioned in Ellen Fleischmann's 2003 book The Nation and Its New Women: The Palestinian Women's Movement, 1920-1948.

She also features in Raja Shehadeh's 2011 book A Rift in Time: Travels with My Ottoman Uncle. Shehadeh is Nassar's husband, Najib's, great nephew and the book follows Najib's life.

In 2020, the Palestinian Museum programmed a play inspired by her husband's life called Saheb Al-Karmil (in English: The Owner of Al-Karmil). Because of the COVID-19 pandemic, the play was recorded and the video reached a global audience.

In 2022, Middle East Eye ran a feature entitled 'In pictures, Palestinian women and anti-colonial resistance in the 1930s', celebrating the work of Palestinian women activists including Nassar.
