= Said Arikat =

Palestinian journalist (born 1947/1948)

- سعيد عريقات
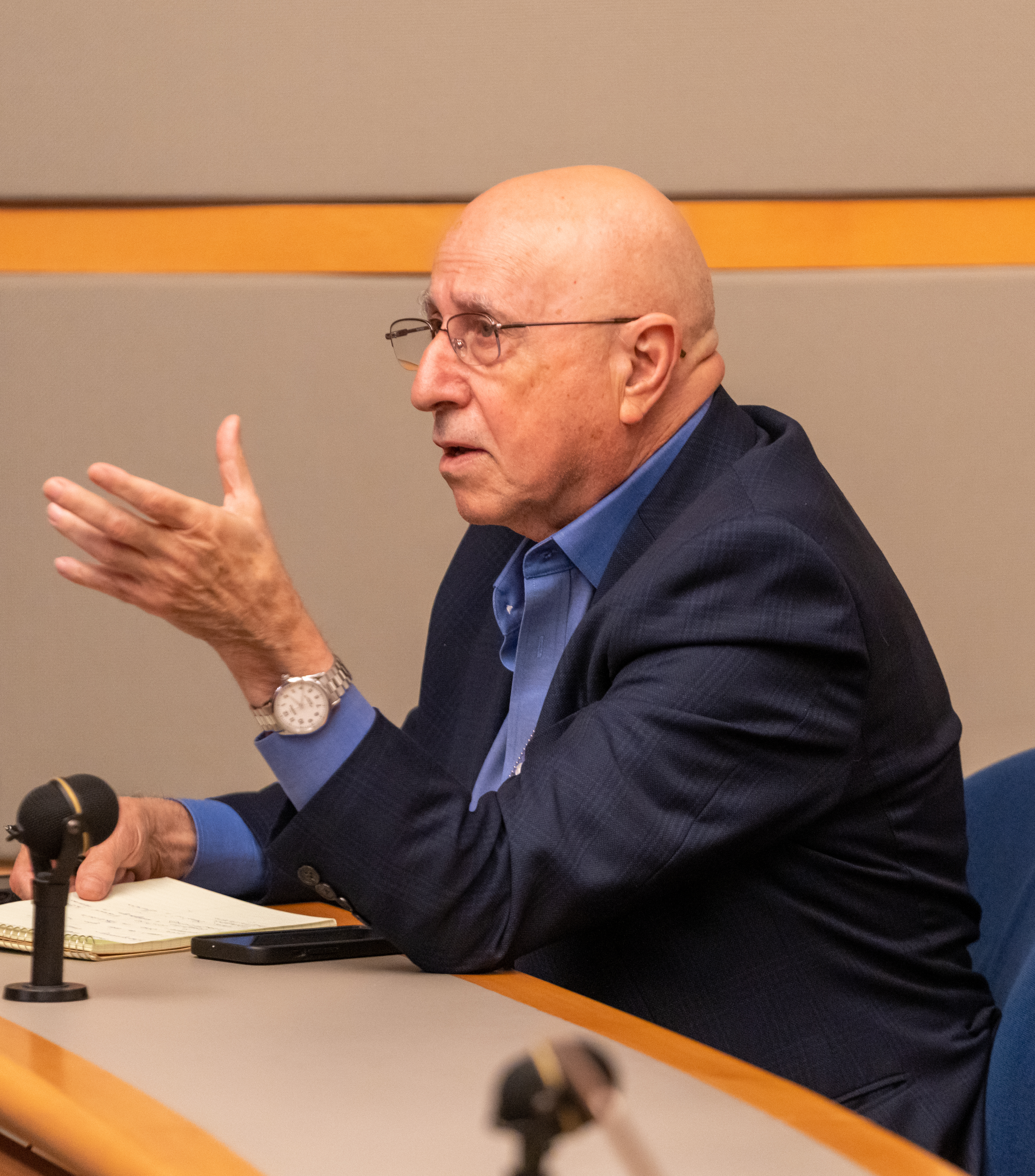
- Arikat in 2022
- Born: 1947 or 1948 (age 76–77); Jericho, Mandatory Palestine
- Occupation: Journalist
- Employer: Al-Quds

Said Arikat (Arabic: سعيد عريقات, romanized: Saʿīd ʿUrayqāt, Palestinian Arabic: ʿRēqāt; born 1947 or 1948) is a Palestinian journalist and the Washington bureau chief for Jerusalem-based newspaper Al-Quds. He also teaches as an adjunct professor at the American University. From 2005 to 2010, Arikat served as the spokesperson for the United Nations Assistance Mission for Iraq.

A long time attendee of press briefings at the U.S. State Department, Arikat has been noted for his sometimes contentious exchanges with State Department Spokespersons, including John Kirby, Heather Nauert, and Ned Price. Some have criticized Arikat for pushing a Palestinian point of view, with Charles Bybelezer of the Jewish News Syndicate saying that Arikat "routinely bashes Israel ... at U.S. State Department briefings", a point of view that Philip Weiss of Mondoweiss said was a "smear by the Zionist press". Yisrael Medad opined in The Jerusalem Post that Arikat asks questions laden with misstatements.

On 3 December 2022, Arikat's Twitter account was suspended for violations. He said he had not been told what the violations were. On 29 December, the suspension was lifted. Speaking to Al Jazeera, Arikat stated he believed the suspension is related to him being outspoken about Palestine, saying that he "can't think of any other reason."

Arikat has appeared on Al Jazeera, C-SPAN, NBC News, and PBS. Arikat has also written for Dubai-based newspaper Gulf News.
