= Rashidiya school =

Coordinates: 31°47′2.1″N 35°14′5.03″E

Al-Rashidiya Secondary School for Boys
- المدرسة الرشيدية
- East Jerusalem

Information
- School type: Publicly funded Secondary
- Gender: Male

Rashidiya School (Arabic: المدرسة الرشيدية), or Al-Rashidiya Secondary School for Boys (المدرسة الرشيدية الثانوية للبنين), is a public school located in East Jerusalem next to Herod's Gate (Bab as-Sahira). Rashidiya was established in the late Ottoman Empire era.

Today, Rashidiya has approximately 400 students and a staff of 25. The school consists of 3 main buildings which include 20 classrooms, a library, a laboratory and a soccer field.

== Notable teachers ==
- Mohammad Amin al-Husayni (c. 1897–1974), Grand Mufti of Jerusalem; in 1920
- Jabra Ibrahim Jabra (1919–1994), author, poet, artist and intellectual
- Boulos Shehadeh (1882–1943), teacher and journalist
- Fadi Abu Shkhaydem (1979–2021), perpetrator of the 2021 Jerusalem shooting

== Notable alumni ==
- Jabra Ibrahim Jabra
- Aziz Abu Sarah
- Mahdi Abdul Hadi
- Omar Aggad
