= Shehab News Agency =

Palestinian news agency

- وكالة شهاب للأنباء
- Formation: January 2007; 19 years ago
- Type: News agency
- Official language: Arabic
- Owner: Hamas
- Website: shehabnews.com

Shehab News Agency (Arabic: وكالة شهاب للأنباء), is a Palestinian news agency affiliated with Hamas. It was established in January 2007 in Gaza. It's part of the al-Aqsa Media Network.

Its website is blocked by the Palestinian Authority in the West Bank. Facebook blocked its accounts in 2021. Their main Telegram channel is blocked on the version of the Telegram app available on the Google Play store.

The agency’s Twitter account has been withheld in European Union countries in response to a legal demand.

Shehab News Agency used homophobic slurs to cover the Tel Aviv Pride.

== See also ==
- History of Palestinian journalism
