= Raja Shehadeh =

Palestinian lawyer, human rights activist and writer (born 1951)

- رجا شحادة
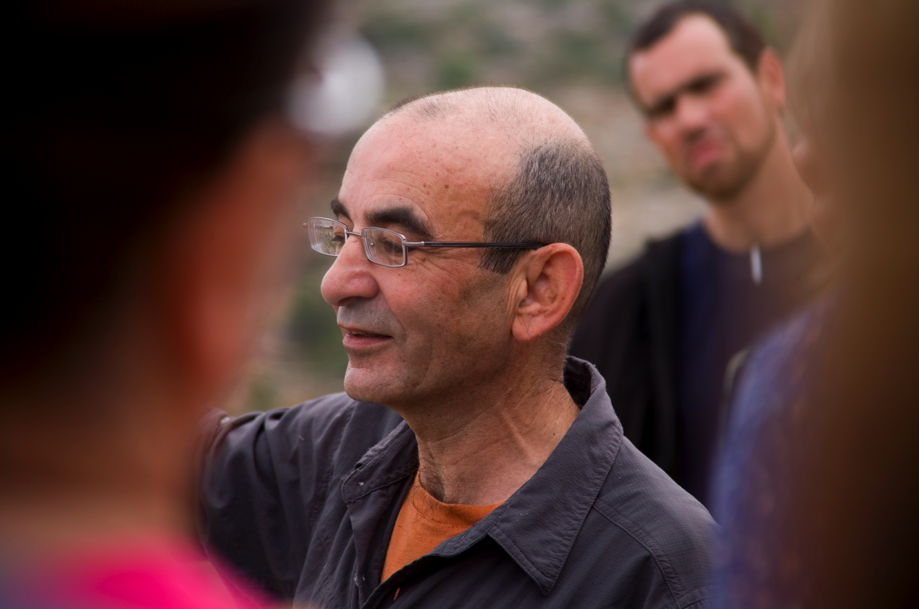
- Born: 1951 (age 74–75); Ramallah
- Education: Birzeit University; American University of Beirut, University of Law
- Spouse: Penny Johnson (married 1988–present)
- Relatives: Najib Nassar (great-great-uncle)
- Website: rajashehadeh.net

Raja Shehadeh (Arabic: رجا شحادة, born 6 July 1951) is a Palestinian lawyer, human rights activist and writer. He co-founded the award-winning Palestinian human rights organization Al-Haq in 1979. In 2008, he won the Orwell Prize, a British award for political writing, for his book Palestinian Walks.

== Early life ==
Shehadeh was born into a prominent Palestinian Christian family. His grandfather, Saleem, was a judge in the courts of Mandate Palestine. His great-great-uncle, the journalist Najib Nassar, founded the Haifa-based newspaper Al-Karmil in the last years of the Ottoman Empire, before World War I. His father, Aziz, was one of the first Palestinians to publicly support a two-state solution to the Arab-Israeli conflict.

His family fled from Jaffa to Ramallah in 1948. In 1951, Shehadeh was born in Ramallah, West Bank, where he also grew up. He attended Birzeit College for two years before moving to Beirut and studying English literature at the American University of Beirut. After graduating from the American University of Beirut, Raja studied at the College of Law in London. Following his education, Shehadeh returned to Ramallah and went into legal practice with his father.

Shehadeh has been married to writer Penny Johnson, a researcher at the Institute of Women's Studies at Birzeit University in Palestine, since 1988.

== Legal and literary career ==
In 1979, Shehadeh co-founded the human rights organization Al-Haq, which is the Palestinian affiliate of the International Commission of Jurists. He has written several books on international law, human rights and the Middle East. Al-Haq was one of the first human rights organizations in the Arab world. It was a co-recipient of the Carter-Menil Human Rights Prize in 1989, and it received the Geuzenpenning in 2009.

During the early 1990s, Shehadeh served as one of three legal advisers to the Palestinian Steering Committee, which guided the official delegation in the U.S.-led peace talks following the Madrid Conference of 1991. Shehadeh played a key role in shaping the delegation’s legal approach. However, the Israeli team barred Shehadeh from directly participating in the negotiations, citing his status as an East Jerusalem resident. Faced with this exclusion and a growing sense that legal arguments were being sidelined by both the Israelis and the Americans, Shehadeh ultimately resigned. He later explained that he saw "no role for a legal adviser, or indeed legal strategies".

In addition to his legal work, Shehadeh has written a number of books about Palestine through the lens of his life. He tells the story of his early life and his relationship with his father in Strangers in the House, a memoir described by The Economist as "distinctive and truly impressive". In 2008, he won the Orwell Prize, Britain's pre-eminent award for political writing, for his book Palestinian Walks. In July 2018, his biography Where the Line is Drawn: Crossing Boundaries in Occupied Palestine was chosen for BBC Radio 4's Book of the Week and narrated by actor Peter Polycarpou.

In 2016, Shehadeh took part in a project, initiated by the organization Breaking the Silence, to write an article for a book on the Israeli occupation to mark the 50th anniversary of the Six-Day War. The book was edited by Michael Chabon and Ayelet Waldman and published under the title Kingdom of Olives and Ash: Writers Confront the Occupation in June 2017.

London Review of Books editor Adam Shatz cited Shehadeh as one of two people who have provided a formative influence of his understanding of the Middle East conflict, writing that "Anguished and somewhat fragile, he is a man who, in spite of his understandable bitterness, has continued to dream of a future beyond the occupation, a kind of neo-Ottoman federation where Arabs and Jews would live as equals."

In 2022, he was elected a Royal Society of Literature International Writer. He was a finalist for the 2023 National Book Award for Nonfiction for We Could Have Been Friends, My Father and I. The book was also a finalist for the Los Angeles Times Book Prize.

== Bibliography ==
=== Books ===
- The West Bank and the Rule of Law, International Commission of Jurists and Law in the Service of Man. (1980)
- Civilian Administration of the Occupied West Bank - Analysis of Israeli Military Government Order No 947, Law in the Service of Man. (1982)
- The Third Way. A Journal of Life in the West Bank. Quartet Books Ltd. (1982)
- Samed: Journal of a West Bank Palestinian, Franklin Watts. (1984)
- Occupier's Law: Israel and the West Bank, Institute for Palestine Studies. (1988)
- Les Palestiniens de l'intérieur: les arrière-plans politiques, éco et sociaux de l'Intifada,(In French) Institut des études palestiniennes. (1989)
- The Palestinian People in the Occupied Territories and Israel: The Political and Social Background of the Intifada,(In Arabic) Institute for Palestine Studies. (1990)
- The Sealed Room: Selections from the Diary of a Palestinian Living Under Israeli Occupation, September 1990-August 1991. (1992)
- The Declaration of Principles & the legal system in the West Bank, PASSIA. (1994)
- From Occupation to Interim Accords: Israel And the Palestinian Territories, BRILL.(1997)
- Strangers in the house. Steerforth Press. 2002.
- Palestine, terre promise,(In French) PAYOT. (2003)
- When the Bulbul Stopped Singing: A Diary of Ramallah under Siege (2003),(2024).
- Palestinian Walks: Forays into a Vanishing Landscape (2007), 2nd edition published as Palestinian Walks: Notes on a Vanishing Landscape (2008)
- A Rift In Time: Travels With My Ottoman Uncle (2010)
- 2037: Le grand bouleversement,(In French) Galaade. (2011)
- Occupation Diaries (2012)
- Language of War, Language of Peace (2015)
- Shifting Sands: The Unravelling of the Old Order in the Middle East, Profile Books. (2015)
- Time and Remains of Palestine, Kehrer. (2015)
- Un reino de olivos y ceniza: Escritores contra la ocupación de Palestina,(In Spanish) Literatura Random House. (2017)
- Where the Line is Drawn: Crossing Boundaries in Occupied Palestine (2017)
- Life Behind Israeli Checkpoints (2017)
- Going Home: A Walk Through Fifty Years of Occupation, Profile Books. (2019)
- We Could Have Been Friends, My Father and I: A Palestinian Memoir, Profile Books. (2022)
- Palestina,(In Italian) Iperborea. (2023)
- What Does Israel Fear From Palestine?, Profile Books. (2024).
- Forgotten: Searching for Palestine's Hidden Places and Lost Memorials, Profile Books. (2025)

=== Book reviews ===
Year	Review article	Work(s) reviewed
2019	Shehadeh, Raja (7–20 March 2019). "Bearing witness in the West Bank". The New York Review of Books. 66 (4): 33–34.	Shulman, David. Freedom and despair : notes from the south Hebron hills. Chicago: University of Chicago Press.

=== Critical studies and reviews of Shehadeh's work ===
Strangers in the house

- "Strangers in the house : coming of age in occupied Palestine". ReadingGroupGuides. The Book Report, Inc.
