= Boulos Shehadeh =

Palestinian journalist and politician (1882–1943)

- Born: 1882; Ramallah, Ottoman Palestine
- Died: 1 August 1943 (aged 60–61); Jerusalem, Mandatory Palestine
- Resting place: Ramallah, Mandatory Palestine
- Education: Shabab College
- Occupation: Journalist
- Known for: Founder of Mirat Al Sharq
- Political party: Committee of Union and Progress; Arab National Party; National Defense Party
- Spouse: Mary Sarrouf
- Children: 3

Boulos Shehadeh (1882–1943) was a Palestinian journalist and politician. He was the founder of the newspaper Mirat Al Sharq (Arabic: Mirror of the East). He also worked for various publications as a journalist.

== Early life and education ==
Shehadeh was born in Ramallah in 1882. He had two brothers.

Shehadeh completed his high school education in the Zion College in Jerusalem and obtained a degree in Arabic language from the Shabab College, precursor of the English College.

== Career and activities ==
Shehadeh started his journalistic career during his studies. He worked as a correspondent for various newspapers and became a columnist for the Beirut-based newspaper Lisan al Hal. His column was titled Ashwak wa zahr (Arabic: Thorns and Flowers). Following his graduation Shehadeh was employed as a teacher at the Orthodox School in Haifa and became its principal in 1907. He was a member of the Committee of Union and Progress. He had to leave his teaching and administrative post at the Orthodox School in 1907 due to a speech he gave in Haifa in which he expressed harsh criticisms against the Ottoman Sultan Abdulhamid. The Ottomans issued an arrest warrant for him, and he settled in Cairo, Egypt, where he worked for Al Zuhur, Al Muayyad, Al Muqattam, Al Hilal and Al Muqtataf. Shehadeh also wrote poems.

Shehadeh returned to Palestine after the Young Turk Revolution in 1908 and continued to work as a teacher and journalist. He taught at the Orthodox School in Bethlehem and served as its principal until the beginning of World War I in 1914. He was then employed as a clerk in the Ottoman army in Beersheba. He worked as a pharmacist's assistant to his brother, Dr. Niqula Shehadeh, who was serving as the official municipality physician in Jenin and the head of the military hospital. Shehadeh was a teacher at the Rashidiya school in Jerusalem between 1919 and 1922.

Shehadeh founded a newspaper entitled Mirat Al Sharq of which the first issue appeared on 17 September 1919. He also edited the paper. He participated in the establishment of the Arab National Party in 1923. He was a member of the Arab Executive Committee between 1926 and 1938 and was part of the delegations that participated in the Arab Congresses held in Jerusalem, Haifa, and Nablus. He was also among the founders of the National Defense Party in 1934.

Shehadeh was a member of the Muslim-Christian Association and was among the active figures of the Palestinian Episcopalian community.

== Personal life and death ==
Shehadeh was married to Mary Sarrouf, and they had three children: two sons, Aziz (1921–1985) and Fouad (born 1925), and one daughter, Najla.

Shehadeh died in Jerusalem on 1 August 1943 and was buried in a cemetery in Ramallah.
