= Najib Nassar =

Najib Nassar (Arabic: نجيب نصار; January 1, 1865 – December 28, 1947) was a Palestinian journalist perhaps best known as the owner-editor of, and frequent contributor to, the Palestinian weekly newspaper Al-Karmil. Historian Rashid Khalidi described him as "a pioneer among Palestinian and Arab journalists" due to "the sophistication and tenaciousness of his opposition to Zionism."

== Early and personal life ==
Nassar was born in a mountain village called Ein Einub (or Ain Ainoub), Lebanon, Ottoman Empire. The family left the village in the middle of the 19th century. Nassar was educated in Lebanon. His religious background was Christian.

Early on in his adult life, Nassar worked as a pharmacist for the Scottish Hospital in Tiberias in the Ottoman Empire.

In 1927, he married Sadhij Bahaa, herself known as a leading defender of women's rights in Palestine and as the daughter of Mirza Badiʻu'llah Effendí. The couple ran Al-Karmil jointly thereafter.

Nassar died in the French Hospital in Nazareth following a hernia operation on December 28, 1947. He was buried in the city's Greek Orthodox cemetery.

== Journalism and politics ==
In 1908, Nassar became the founding editor of Al-Karmil, the first Palestinian anti-Zionist weekly newspaper in Arabic. It was first published in Haifa in December 1908. He was involved in the formation of an association in Haifa with the aim of preventing implementation of Zionist plans and colonial activities in Palestine. He warned against land sales to Jews and Zionists. In 1911, he published the first book in Arabic on Zionism, entitled al-Sihyuniyya: Tarikhuha, gharaduha, ahamiyyatuha [Zionism: Its History, Objective and Importance]. The book consisted of an abridged translation of the article on Zionism from The Jewish Encyclopedia plus critical commentary by Nassar.

Nassar was a part of the political opposition in the waning days of the Ottoman Empire and was imprisoned in Damascus by Ottoman authorities in 1918. He established the Arab Party in Nazareth in the same year. He maintained his Ottoman loyalty all his life, but called himself a Palestinian patriot. Nassar wrote novels and plays as well as critical articles on Zionism, and he was an outspoken critic of Turkish-led Ottoman politics. He traveled to Karak, Jordan, in 1924 with Jordanian poet Mustafa Wahbi At-Tal, calling for Arab unity.

Historian Rashid Khalidi placed Nassar among "the intellectuals, writers, and politicians who were instrumental in the evolution of the first forms of Palestinian identity at the end of the [19th] century and early in the [20th] century," a group Khalidi characterized as having "identified with the Ottoman Empire, their religion, their Arabism, their homeland Palestine, their city or region, and their family, without feeling any contradiction, or sense of conflicting loyalties."

== Legacy ==
Nassar's life provided the inspiration for the 2010 book A Rift in Time: Travels with My Ottoman Uncle by Raja Shehadeh, and he was featured in esteemed Palestinian writer Ibrahim Nasrallah's 2009 novel Time of White Horses.

In 2019, the Palestinian National Theatre produced a play about his life called “Saheb Al-Karmil” (“Owner of Al-Karmil”) written by Amer Hlehel.

== See also ==
- Palestine theater pays homage to country's pioneer journalist
