= Palestine Times =

Palestinian newspaper launched in 2006

Palestine Times was the only English-language daily Palestinian newspaper. It was a family-owned business with its main office in Ramallah. It was initially distributed all over the West Bank (including East Jerusalem) and the Gaza Strip. On March 13, 2007, the paper signed a contract with BAR, an Israeli newspaper distribution company, and was available in Israel too. It was to be aimed at the generally well-educated minority of Palestinians who speak English, as well as Israelis. The newspaper went out of business less than six months after its launch.

== History ==
The newspaper was launched on November 27, 2006. Its editor-in-chief was Othman Fakhri Mohammed. Its stated aim was to reflect all aspects of Palestinian life accurately to the world. It received no funding from any Palestinian political party or faction, and aimed to be independent. According to Mohammed during an interview with the Israeli daily Haaretz, "[Writing freely about negative stories in the PA]'s not a problem. I am a Palestinian and the writers are Palestinians. Beyond the fact that I'm biased in favor of the Palestinian cause, I don't see any problem with criticizing corruption or political phenomena in the territories. Our problem is that in this part of the world, they don't sue you for damaging someone, they simply shoot you. Therefore, I have to be careful." Ynetnews, an online Israeli English-language news site, included a "Congratulations" blurb over an article reporting on the publication of the newspaper. It was funded by advertising, subscriptions, and sales.

Among the notable journalists working for the paper were Khalid Amayreh, a journalist from Dura, Hebron region, whose original copy was written in English, unlike many of the paper's journalists who wrote in Arabic and whose copy was then translated. Almost all of the paper's journalistic contributors were Palestinians. Palestine Times was not a translated edition, since no Arabic-language version existed. In this respect the paper was more similar to the English-language Jerusalem Post rather than the Hebrew-language Haaretz, which publishes an English edition.

A monthly news website of the same name was previously established at www.ptimes.org but it was not associated with the daily newspaper. In addition, between 1999 and 2017, a media website under the name The Palestine Times was established at www.palestinetimes.com.

== Closure ==
Palestine Times ceased publication on May 18, 2007, citing "extreme financial difficulties." On July 18, The Jerusalem Post reported that Mohammed planned to resume publication of the newspaper in August. It did not relaunch, however, and its website (www.times.ps) remains inactive.
