= Gaza Weekly Newspaper =

Palestinian newspaper established in 1950

- Type: Daily Newspaper
- Format: Print, online
- Founded: 1950

The Gaza Weekly Newspaper (Arabic: جريدة غزة الأسبوعية) is a weekly newspaper established in 1950, and published from the city of Gaza. The first issue was on 6 July 1951. The newspaper is printed in the Zeitoun neighbourhood in Gaza City. It is distributed in Jordan, Saudi Arabia and Egypt.
