= Lisan Al Arab (newspaper) =

Daily newspaper in Jerusalem (1921–1925)

- Type: Daily newspaper
- Founders: Ibrahim Salim Al Najjar; Ahmed Izzat Al Adami; Ibrahim Al Muhib
- Founded: 24 June 1921
- Ceased publication: 30 April 1925
- Language: Arabic
- Headquarters: Jerusalem
- Country: Mandatory Palestine

Lisan Al Arab (Arabic: لسان العرب, romanized: Lisan al-'Arab, lit. 'The Voice of Arabs') was a daily newspaper which was published in Jerusalem, Mandatory Palestine, from 1921 to 1925. It was the first daily newspaper in Palestine.

== History and profile ==
Lisan Al Arab was first published on 24 June 1921 as a daily newspaper. Lebanese journalist Ibrahim Salim Al Najjar was the cofounder and a member of its editorial board. The other founders of the paper were Ahmed Izzat Al Adami, also a Lebanese journalist, and Ibrahim Al Muhib. Adel Jaber was among its major contributors.

Lisan Al Arab was subject to frequent criticisms due to its alleged pro-British and pro-Zionist political stance. In fact, it was a supporter of the British policies in regard to the Jews and Arabs in Palestine. The British administration in Palestine asked Ibrahim Salim Al Najjar to report the British policies concerning the region in Lisan Al Arab. Therefore, the paper was boycotted, and Palestinians who were the opponents of the British attacked its offices.

Mustafa Kemal Pasha's victory over the Greek army in September 1922 was enthusiastically welcomed by Falastin, another Palestine newspaper, but an editorial of Lisan Al Arab dated October 1922 published the following statement which had been allegedly said by him or one of his close allies: "You Arabs should not think that we forgot the treachery [sayyi’a] you committed against us." This was described as a lie by Abdul Qadir Al Muzaffar, an editor of Falastin.

The frequency of Lisan Al Arab was switched to three times per week from 1923, and the paper continued with this frequency until 30 April 1925 when it ceased publication after producing 543 issues.
