= Al-Quds (newspaper) =

Palestinian newspaper

- 2019 edition
- Type: Daily newspaper
- Format: broadsheet
- Owner: Abu Zalaf Family
- Publisher: Al-Quds Arab Press
- Editor: Walid Abu-Zalaf
- Founded: 1967; 59 years ago (As "Al-Quds")
- Political alignment: Centre-right
- Language: Arabic
- Headquarters: Jerusalem
- Website: Official website

Al-Quds (Arabic: القدس, lit. 'Jerusalem') is a Palestinian Arabic-language daily newspaper, based in Jerusalem and published in broadsheet format. The largest circulation daily newspaper in Palestine, it was founded in 1967 as a merger of two publications: Al-Difa' (in Arabic الدفاع) and Al-Jihad (in Arabic الجهاد). The owner of the former Al-Jihad newspaper (which was founded in 1951), Mahmoud Abu-Zalaf, served as its first editor-in-chief until his death in 2005. It is currently edited by his son, Walid Abu-Zalaf.

Al-Quds is the most widely read Palestinian daily and the most widely circulated newspaper in the West Bank. In addition to paper circulation, the newspaper publishes its content online in PDF and HTML format. On 17 December 2008, the newspaper's website began publishing content in Persian.

Amidst the Fatah–Hamas conflict, Hamas banned Al-Quds in the Gaza Strip in 2008. As a step in the Fatah–Hamas reconciliation process, Hamas permitted its publication in the territory beginning in 2014.

The paper operates an office in Washington, D.C., with bureau chief Said Arikat reporting on U.S. foreign policy, specifically as it related to the Israeli–Palestinian conflict. In early 2023, the news website added a Hebrew and an English edition.

In 2018, editor Walid Abu-Zalaf conducted an interview with Jared Kushner, then senior advisor to President Donald Trump.

== Controversies ==
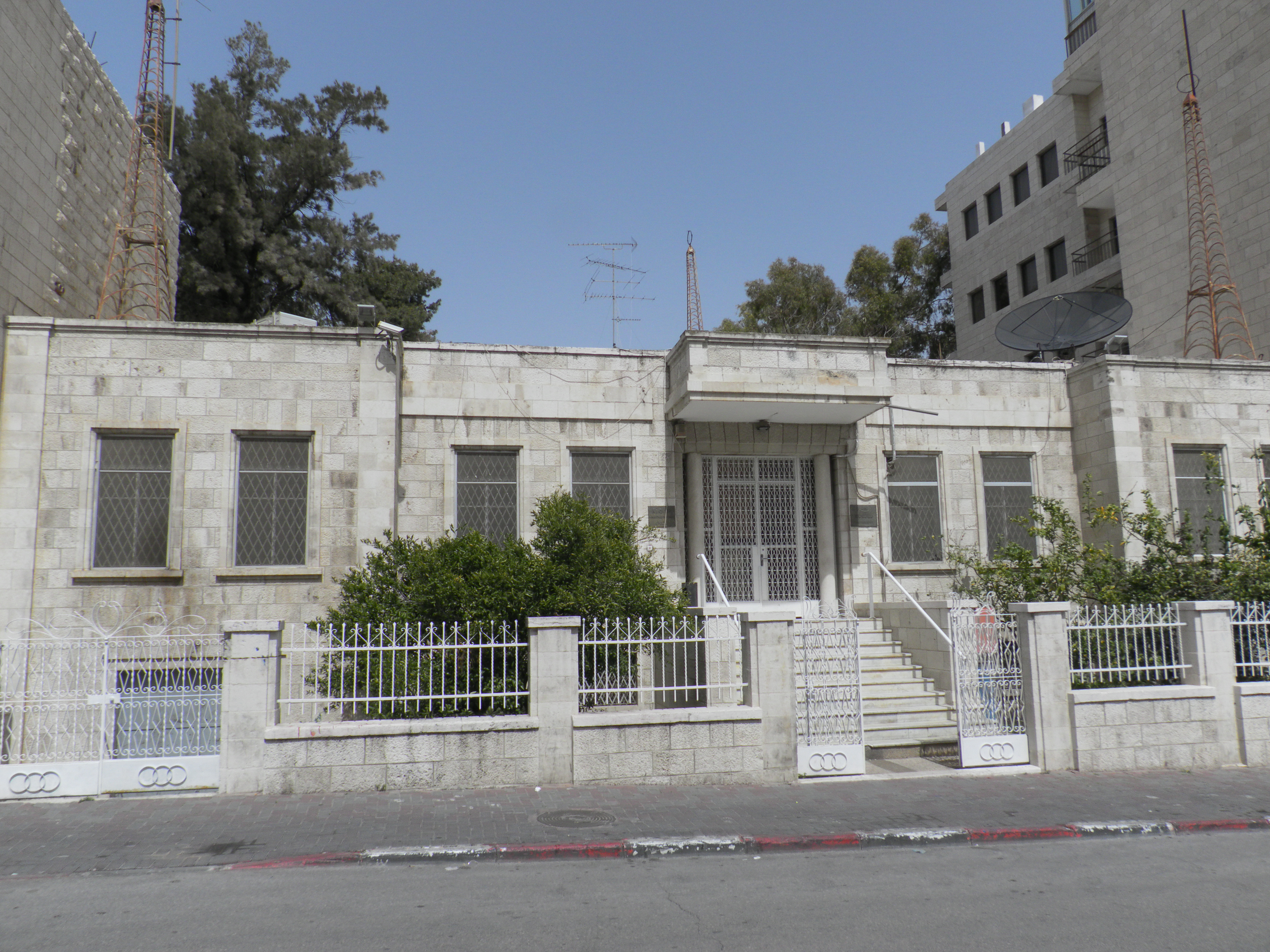
Al-Quds building, Jerusalem

In the edition of 30 November 1997, the newspaper claimed that The Protocols of the Elders of Zion publication was not a hoax.

== Editorial stance ==
Al-Quds went against the traditional Palestinian boycott of Israeli elections in East Jerusalem by publishing full-page ads and endorsing mayoral candidate Arcadi Gaydamak in 2008.

== See also ==
- Al-Quds Al-Arabi
- Asharq Al-Awsat
- Quds News Network
