= Mir'at al-Sharq (newspaper) =

Palestinian newspaper (1919–1939)

Mir’at al-Sharq (Arabic: مرآة الشرق, romanized: mirʿā ash-sharq, lit. 'Mirror of the East') was a Palestinian newspaper published in the British mandate of Palestine during the period between 1919 and 1939.

== History and profile ==
Mir’at al-Sharq was founded in Jerusalem in September 17, 1919 by Boulos Shehadeh, a Christian Palestinian from Ramallah. The paper appeared weekly. During its first three months all newswriters were located in Palestinian towns, but at the same time the newspaper considered Palestine as part of Syria. Moreover, news concerning Beirut and Damascus appeared in the section on "News of the Areas" (Akhbar al-jihhat). In the early years it published articles in both Arabic and English languages, but then it became an Arabic publication.

The paper often blurred the lines between “news” and “editorials." Political commentary was often accompanied by telegrams, notices and news. Front-page articles often dove didactically into political and social issues. Qustandi has argued as well that the newspaper was among the most significant papers published in Palestine during the Mandate period and reflected the most significant events of the day.

Shihadah supported the opposition faction in Palestinian politics during the Mandate period. Zachary J. Foster has argued that:

"In its attempt to discredit the Husseini-dominated national leadership, the paper frequently looked to Egypt, Syria, Turkey and elsewhere with examples of more successful national movements in order to emulate their achievements and sidestep their blunders."

After the early-mid 1920s, Foster claims that "many Palestinians came under the influence of their neighbors in the Arab world and beyond to a much greater extent than has been acknowledged."

Mir’at al-Sharq adopted a pro-British political stance, which led to the attack of its offices in 1925. The paper ceased publication in 1939.

The issues of Mir’at al-Sharq were archived in Al Aqsa Mosque library in Jerusalem.
