= Al-Karmil (newspaper) =

Newspaper published in Haifa (1908–1942)

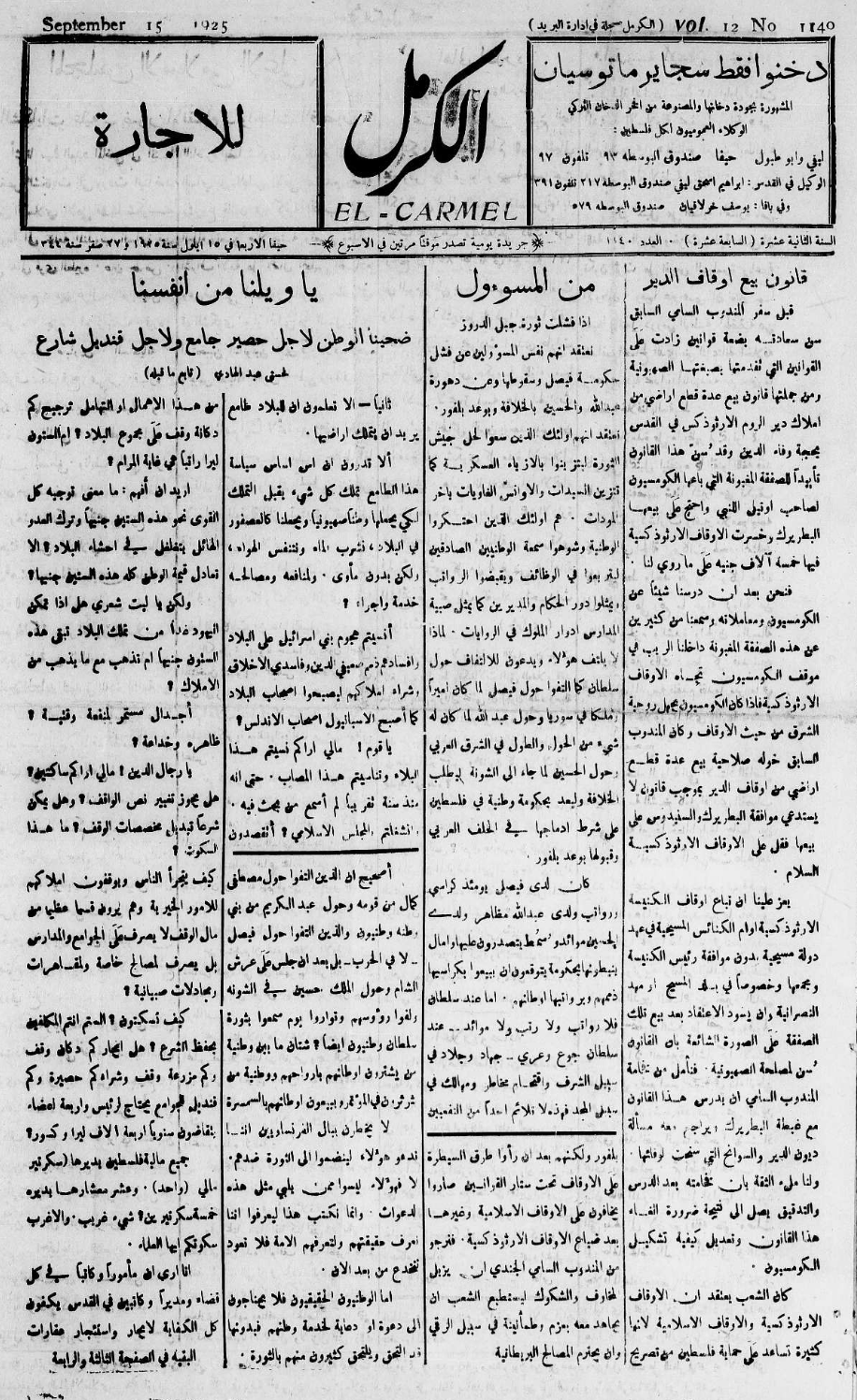
- 15 September 1925 edition of Al-Karmil newspaper
- Type: Weekly newspaper
- Owner: Najib Nassar
- Founded: 1908
- Ceased publication: approx. 1944
- Political alignment: Anti-Zionism
- Headquarters: Haifa

Al-Karmil or El-Carmel (Arabic: الكرمل) was a bi-weekly Arabic-language newspaper founded toward the end of Ottoman imperial rule in Palestine. Named for Mount Carmel in the Haifa district, the first issue was published in December 1908, with the stated purpose of "opposing Zionist colonization".

The owner, editor and key writer for the newspaper was Najib Nassar, a Palestinian Arab Christian and staunch anti-Zionist, whose editorials warning of the dangers posed by Zionism to the Palestinian people were often reprinted in other Syrian newspapers.

Beginning in the 1920s, Najib's wife, Sadhij Nassar (c.1900 – c.1970) was also a key editor, administrator and journalist for the newspaper. Besides writing, she also translated articles from the foreign press, and was editor from 1941 to 1944, when the British Mandate authorities refused to grant her a permit.

After the demise of the Ottoman empire in the wake of World War I, Al-Karmil continued to be published during British Mandatory rule in British Palestine well into the 1940s.

== Editorial policies ==
=== Anti-Zionism ===
Writing of Al-Karmil and another early Arab Palestinian newspaper, Filastin, Rashid Khalidi characterizes them as "instrumental in shaping early Palestinian national consciousness and in stirring opposition to Zionism." Khalidi contends that almost immediately after the publication of its first issue in December 1908, al-Karmil "became the primary vehicle of an extensive campaign against Zionist settlement in Palestine."

Najib Nassar, owner, editor and journalist for the paper, not only printed news items and editorials concerning Zionism and its aims, but also re-published articles on Zionism from other Arabic newspapers based in Cairo, Beirut and Damascus, such as al-Muqattam, al-Ahram, al-Mufid, al-Ittihad al-'Uthmani, and al-Muqtabas, as well as from Istanbul-based al-Hadara and Jaffa-based Filastin. Further, Nassar devoted detailed coverage to the activities and aims of Zionist organizations in Palestine and abroad. Between March and June 1911, al-Karmil published a sixteen-part series on "Zionism: Its history, objective, and importance" that was later released as a 65-page booklet. The material included condensed translation of the article on Zionism from the Encyclopedia Judaica, and Nassar's comments. The booklet concluded by describing the efforts of Theodor Herzl on behalf of Zionism, calling for men like Herzl, "...who will forget their private interests in favor of the public good," to step forth from among the Palestinian population to oppose Zionism. Nassar's purpose was to incite public opinion against Zionism, whose aims and activities he viewed as a threat to the Arab character of Palestine, but he also focused on alerting the public to instances in which the ruling Ottoman and later British authorities were colluding with Zionists to facilitate Jewish land purchases.

At the outbreak of the First World War in 1914, Najib Nassar spoke out against Turkish entry into the conflict and was put on a wanted list. Accused of spying for the British against Ottoman Turkey and its German allies, he fled from his home in Haifa to Nazareth, and from there, wandered over the Galilee and the eastern bank of the River Jordan. He went on the run for three years, living with Bedouin goat herders in the hills of what is now the Israeli Galilee, West Bank and northern Jordan, narrowly escaping capture.

=== Women's rights ===
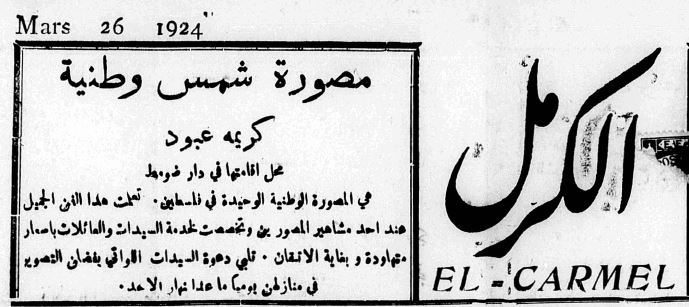
Karimeh Abbud advertising her photography business in Al-Karmil in 1924

In 1926, al-Karmil began publishing a "women's page" (Safhat al-nisa) that was edited by Sadhij Nassar, Najib Nassar's wife, who also served as an editor and director of administration for the newspaper as a whole. Her journalistic contributions between 1926 and 1933 have been characterized as a kind of "one-woman press", wherein she commented on a wide range topics, including women's activities locally, regionally, and internationally. Encouraging women to raise their male and female children equally and to take up work to facilitate their economic independence, Nassar also urged women to get involved in politics, while avoiding factionalism in favor of unity. For example, in the late 1920s, Nassar wrote, "You are responsible. Yes, you Palestinian Arab ladies, Muslim and Christian, you are responsible for the integrity of the nation (its "watan") and keeping Palestine Arab as it was until now. Every woman will spread the spirit of cooperation among the sons of the Arabs in the souls of her children." In 1930, Sadhij Nassar was a founding member and secretary of the Arab Women's Union Society in Haifa, which was one of the more militant branches of the women's movement during the British Mandate period.

== Relationship with the ruling authorities ==
=== Ottoman rule ===
In its early years, al-Karmil′s editorial line reflected a positive approach toward the ruling imperial authorities, the Turkish Committee of Union and Progress (CUP), but by 1911, like most other pan-Arabist thinkers, it switched to opposing the CUP because of its perceived bias in favor of Zionism. Among the contributing writers to al-Karmil were many who had participated in the Arab revolt of 1916, such as Druze intellectual Ali Nasir al-Din and educator and journalist Hamdi al-Husayni.

=== British Mandate rule ===
In the late 1930s, Sadhij Nassar was described by the British authorities as "a menace to public security" and a "prominent agitator". Nassar was arrested in March 1939 by British police and held in administrative detention under the Defense Emergency Regulations in a women's prison in Bethlehem until February 1940, when she was detained because "she was actively engaged in subversive propaganda." She is cited as being the first female Palestinian political prisoner. After her release, she returned to editing al-Karmil, serving as the editor between 1941 and 1944, when the newspaper was operating without a permit after the British authorities had refused to issue one. She continued her activities in the women's movement until 1948, when she became a refugee and wrote for various publications in London and in Damascus, where she tried to open a branch of the Arab Women's Union Society. She is believed to have died in Damascus during the 1970s.

== Ongoing influence ==
In August 2020, The Palestinian Museum in Birzeit, West Bank hosted 'theatrical narrative' based on Najib Nassar's life on its social media channels called Saheb Al-Karmil (in English: The Owner of Al-Karmil). The piece was performed by four actors: Amer Hlehel, Ivan Azazian, Mohammad Basha and Khawla Ibrahim. As a result of the start of the COVID-19 pandemic, the play was adapted to be performed in the Museum's 'Printed in Jerusalem' exhibition and filmed. The recording reached a global audience.

In 2022, Middle East Eye called the newspaper 'monumental' and argued that it 'contributed widely to the shaping of Palestinian national consciousness'.

== Bibliography ==
- Beška, Emanuel, ANTI-ZIONIST JOURNALISTIC WORKS OF NAJĪB AL-KHŪRĪ NASSĀR IN THE NEWSPAPER AL-KARMAL IN 1914, In Asian and African Studies, 20, 2, 2011
- Beška, Emanuel, ARABIC TRANSLATIONS OF WRITINGS ON ZIONISM PUBLISHED IN PALESTINE BEFORE THE FIRST WORLD WAR, In Asian and African Studies, 23, 1,2014
- Cubert, Harold M. (1997), The PFLP's Changing Role in the Middle East, Routledge, ISBN 978-0-7146-4772-2
- Fleischmann, Ellen (2003), The Nation and Its "new" Women: The Palestinian Women's Movement, 1920-1948, University of California Press, ISBN 978-0-520-23789-6
- Fawaz, Leila Tarazi; Bayly, Christopher Alan; Ilbert, Robert (2002), Modernity and Culture: From the Mediterranean to the Indian Ocean, Columbia University Press, ISBN 978-0-231-11426-4
- Firro, Kais (2003), Inventing Lebanon: Nationalism and the State Under the Mandate, I.B.Tauris, ISBN 978-1-86064-857-1
- Khalidi, Rashid (1997), Palestinian Identity: The Construction of Modern National Consciousness, Columbia University Press, ISBN 0-231-10514-2
- Matthews, Weldon C. (2006), Confronting an Empire, Constructing a Nation: Arab Nationalists and Popular Politics in Mandate Palestine, I.B.Tauris, ISBN 978-1-84511-173-1
- Muslih, Muhammad Y. (1989), The Origins of Palestinian Nationalism, Columbia University Press, ISBN 978-0-231-06509-2
- Seikaly, May (2002), Haifa: Transformation of an Arab Society 1918-1939, I.B.Tauris, ISBN 978-1-86064-556-3
