= Al-Difa' =

Arabic daily newspaper in Mandatory Palestine (1934–1966)

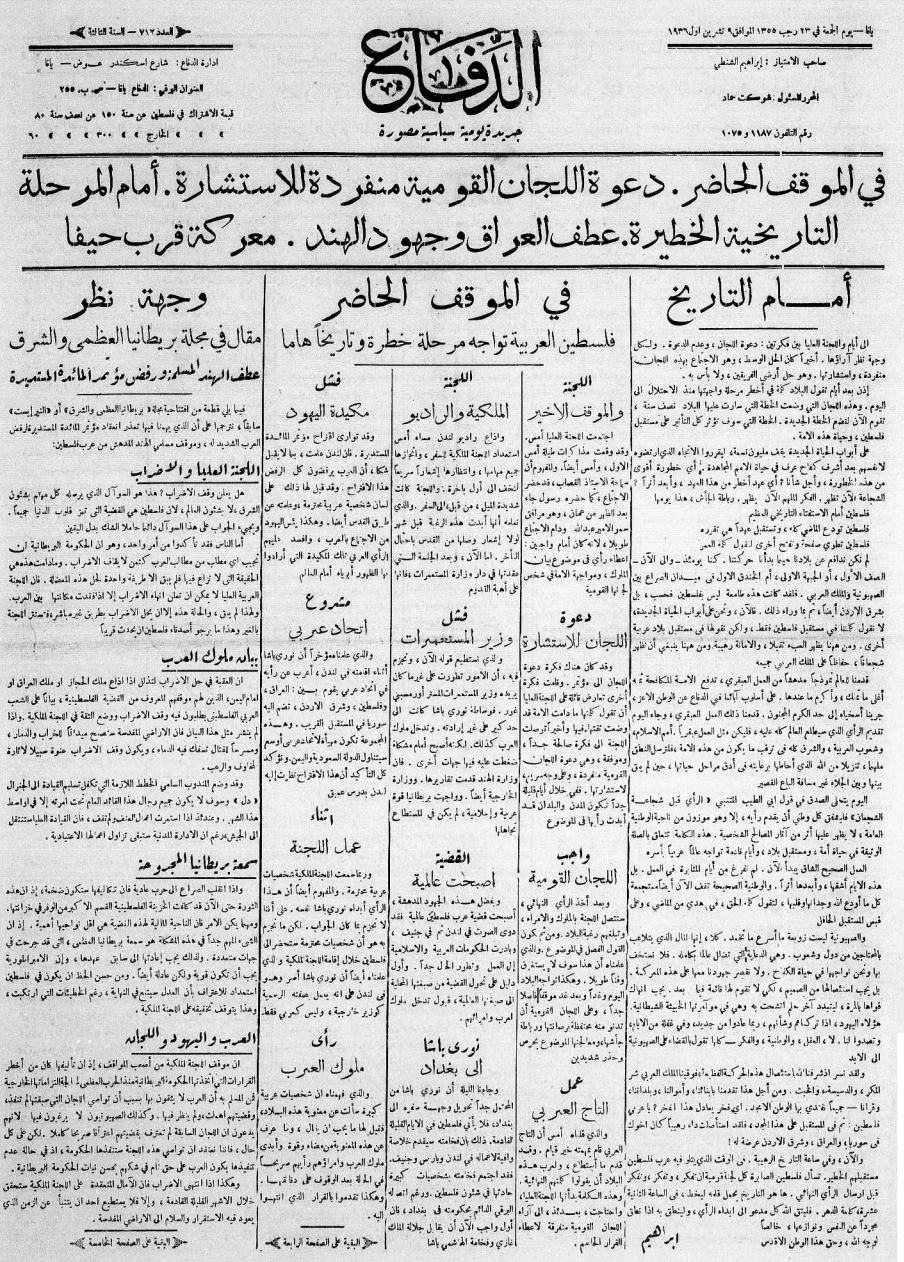
- 9 November 1936 edition of Al-Difa' newspaper
- Type: Daily newspaper
- Owner: Ibrahim Al Shanti
- Founders: Ibrahim Al Shanti; Sami Al Siraj; Khayr Al Din Al Zirikli
- Editor-in-chief: Ibrahim Al Shanti
- Founded: 20 April 1934
- Ceased publication: 26 May 1971
- Political alignment: Arab nationalism
- Language: Arabic
- Headquarters: Jaffa; East Jerusalem; Amman
- Country: Mandatory Palestine; Jordan
- OCLC number: 50763329

Al-Difa' (Arabic: الدفاع, romanized: al-Difāʻ, lit. 'The Defense') was a Palestinian daily newspaper published from 1934 to 1971 with some interruptions. It was one of the most influential Arabic newspapers of the period along with Falastin, and their rivalry marked the mandate period. The paper was based in Jaffa, Mandatory Palestine, until 1948. Then it was published in East Jerusalem and later in Amman. The paper also enjoyed popular support during this period.

== History and profile ==
The paper was first published in Jaffa on 20 April 1934. Its founders, Ibrahim Al Shanti, Sami Al Siraj, and Khayr Al Din Al Zirikli, were three journalists who left the newspaper Al Jamia Al Islamiyya. Ibrahim Al Shanti was the owner and editor of Al-Difa'. Shawkat Hammad took over the role of editor in 1936.

Al-Difa' was published five days per week during its initial period and later became a daily newspaper. The paper had rural and Muslim readers in Mandatory Palestine. It presented its readers several prizes such as cars and motorcycles. The paper was actively interested in the development of Jaffa and submitted a five-year development plan in 1934 to the municipality to improve the city's living, health-care and educational conditions. Al-Difa extensively covered news on the civil war in Spain between 1936 and 1939. It did not openly support the rival groups of the war, but published the views of various countries about these groups. However, the paper presented Francisco Franco in a positive manner and employed the term communists to refer to government forces and the term nationalists to describe rebel forces.

Al-Difa' was banned by the British authorities in 1937 for nearly two months due the publication of allegedly false reports which might "endanger public peace."

The last issue of Al-Difa' in Jaffa appeared on 29 December 1948. Then it was published in East Jerusalem which was under the rule of the Jordanian Hashemites. The paper moved to Amman, Jordan, in 1967 when East Jerusalem was occupied by Israel. It was banned by the Jordanian government on 26 May 1971 due to the publication of an article which allegedly offended the Jordanian authorities. The paper produced 3,874 issues during its run. Its issues published between 1934 and 1951 were archived in Al Aqsa Mosque library in Jerusalem.

== Political stance and contributors ==
Al-Difa' adopted a pan-Arab and pan-Islam political stance. The paper was one of the mouthpieces of the Istiqlal Party between its start in 1934 and 1939. The paper's editors participated in the Arab Journalists’ Congress held in Ramla on 27 May 1936. It was organized to make it possible for the newspapers to reinforce national solidarity and to provide correct information to their readers during the emerging Arab riot. Although Al-Difa was not affiliated with any party during the World War II period, it supported Amin al-Husseini and the Palestinians' struggle against the British rule opposing the Zionism. It was also an advocate of Nazi policies and was financed by the Arab Bank in the 1940s. However, when the racist characteristic of the Nazi regime began to be much more evident, its support for the Nazi policies ended. The paper encouraged the modernization of daily life among the Palestinian middle and upper classes.

Major contributors of Al-Difa' when it was based in Jaffa included Mahmoud Abu Al Zalaf, Mahmoud Yaish, and Ahmad Khalil Al Aqad, and Akram Zuayter.

== Circulation and influence ==
The circulation data given in the report by the Royal Peel Commission which had been formed to examine the Arab riots in the region in 1936 indicate that shortly after its start Al-Difa' reached the circulation level of the influential Falastin newspaper. Their circulation was reported to be between 4,000 and 6,000 copies in the report. It sold 13,000 copies in 1946, whereas Falastin sold 9,000 copies. One of the reasons for the higher circulation of the paper than Falastin was that the readers considered it as a "Muslim publication".

On the other hand, both papers were read aloud publicly in various cities and settlements of the Mandatory Palestine showing that they had readers everywhere in the region. In the mid-1940s Al-Difa' became the most influential Palestinian newspaper.
