= Dehumanization of Jews and Israelis in Palestinian discourse =

Part of the Israeli–Palestinian conflict

Palestinian narratives about Jews and Israelis sometimes zoomorphically portray them as members of non-human species that are considered lowly or loathsome. This kind of dehumanization is commonplace on both sides of the Israeli–Palestinian conflict.

The dehumanization of Jews and Israelis in Muslim and Arab discourse, and specifically in Palestinian discourse, takes place (among other ways) by portraying them as various animals (or other biological phenomena) that are considered lowly, repugnant, impure and sometimes also harmful or dangerous, such as pigs, monkeys, snakes, vampires, octopuses, rats, spiders, cancer and more.

== Background ==
All of these animalistic metaphors are universally considered derogatory to some extent, but some of them have additional specific negative connotations in this context. Some of these additional connotations may be rooted in some traditions regarding specific animals in the Arab or Muslim culture itself (as in the case of dogs), others might be borrowed from European antisemitism (as in the case of vampires).

Some scholars and activists, like Robert Bernstein, a co-founder of Human Rights Watch, and the social psychologist Neil Kressel from William Paterson University, expressed the opinion that the United Nations and human rights groups tend to largely ignore dehumanization of Jews when it comes from the Palestinians or other Arab and Muslim groups.

== Animal similes by species ==
=== Monkeys and pigs ===
In the late 1980s the phrase "sons/brothers of monkeys and pigs" started to appear as an epithet for Jews in messages published by Hamas, Islamic Jihad and later Fatah in Gaza. For example in this quote from a Hamas leaflet from 1988: "O our children: the Jews - brothers of the apes, assassins of the prophets, bloodsuckers, [..] are murdering you, [..]. Only Islam can break the Jews and destroy their dream". The Hamas also used this term to describe the Jews killed in their attacks, for example when Hamas took responsibility for the 1995 Beit Lid suicide bombing it said that it had killed "20 pigs" and injured "60 monkeys". Also, in some of the recorded messages that Palestinian suicide attackers made before their final action, they called their future victims "sons of monkeys and pigs", saying for example: "We are carrying out this operation as harsh revenge against the sons of monkeys and pigs".

In 1996 the Hamas affiliated monthly magazine Falastin Al-Muslima published an article claiming that the transformation of ancient Jews to "apes, pigs, mice and lizards" that is mentioned in Islamic tradition "was actual" and that it "left its mark in the souls of the Jews who came after them". It further claimed that because the Jews felt shame at being descendants of apes they decided to convince all humans that they all developed over time from an ape to human form, and that's why the Theory of Evolution was invented by "the Jewish ape Darwin".

The phrase is used also by Palestinian leaders and officials. In 2001 Abdel Aziz al-Rantisi, then the Hamas spokesman and later head of Hamas in Gaza, said: "The [Hamas] political leadership has freed the hand of the brigades to do whatever they want against the brothers of monkeys and pigs". In the same year, Ibrahim Madhi, a Palestinian Authority (PA) official and Imam in Gaza also called the Jews "apes and pigs" in a sermon on PA TV in Gaza. In 2008, the chairman of the Palestinian Scholars League, and a Hamas legislator in Gaza, Marwan Abu Ras, said "We are besieged [...] by the brothers of apes and pigs."

This description of the Jews is also repeated by officials and clerics of the Palestinian Authority (PA) in the West Bank. For example: in a sermon in 1997 by Ekrima Sabri, then the Grand Mufti of Jerusalem appointed by Yasser Arafat; in a sermon in 2002 by Mohammad Mustafa Najem who in 2024 became the PA's minister of religious affairs; in 2018, by Sheikh Osama Al-Tibi in a sermon in PA TV. In 2022, by Mahmoud al-Habbash, the religious affairs advisor to the PA president Mahmoud Abbas, said in a sermon on PA TV that Muslims must abandon Al-Aqsa to "the grazing herds of humanoids" whom Allah made into "apes and pigs".

In 2012 at a rally marking the 47th anniversary of the founding of Fatah the announcer declared (before inviting the Grand Mufti of Jerusalem Muhammad Ahmad Hussein to speak): "Our war with the descendants of the apes and pigs is a war of religion and faith. Long live Fatah!" In 2015 Raafat Alayan, Fatah spokesman in Jerusalem, called Jews walking around the Old City of Jerusalem "the sons of apes and pigs". In 2023 the Palestinian journalist Dr. Ghassan Mustafa Al-Shami wrote in the Jordanian newspaper Ad-Dustour that "the Zionist Jews" are "the descendants of apes and pigs".

This expression is also used by children and in educational programs aimed at children For example, in 2001 an 11 year children in a Hamas school in Gaza said in front of his class: "I will make my body a bomb that will blast the flesh of Zionists, the sons of pigs and monkeys". In 2013 a young girl recited on Palestinian Authority (PA) TV, a poem with the lines "Oh Sons of Zion, oh most evil among creations, Oh barbaric monkeys, wretched pigs". Same happened in 2014 on Hamas Al-Aqsa TV this time with a boy reciting the poem.

Pictorial depictions of this expression also appeared. For example in Hamas posters, and in caricatures in Felesteen, Al-Resalah, and Al-Quds Al-Arabi.

=== Dogs and wolves ===
The slogan "Palestine is our land and the Jews are our dogs" (in Arabic it is a rhyme: فلسطين بلادنا واليهود كلابنا, romanized: Falastin bladna, w-el-Yahud klabna) first appeared in Palestine in 1918-1919. This chant was used in Arab demonstrations in Jerusalem in March 1920 and 1923. The slogan was also chanted in April 1920 by the crowds in a demonstration that was led by Amin al-Husayni (who later became the Grand Mufti of Jerusalem) and by the editor of the newspaper Suriya al-Janubia (Southern Syria), Aref al-Aref. This demonstration developed into the Nebi Musa riots. Chants of this slogan became a regular feature of the Muslim Nebi Musa festival in Jerusalem during the British Mandate. In the early 1930s in a meeting between Haj Amin al-Husayni and some Bedouin tribe leaders in which he tried to convince them not to sell land to the Jews they answered him: "Haj Amin don't be worried! [...] The land is our land and the Jews are our dogs".

In 1987 the slogan was used in protests and riots perpetrated by Israeli Arab citizens in Jaffa, Haifa and Nazareth, in solidarity with the First Intifada. Palestinian prisoners in Ketziot prison in 1991 used to chant this slogan from time to time, including when Iraq fired missiles on Israel during the First Gulf War. In 2020, a Palestinian was questioned by Israeli Police after he livestreamed himself shouting this slogan at a group of ultra-orthodox Jews in the Old-City of Jerusalem. In the 21st century, the slogan spread to North America. In 2006 there the slogan was chanted (in Arabic) in Palestinian demonstrations in San-Francisco organized by Palestinian organization Al-Awda.

Palestinian children also use this chant. For example, an incident was reported in 1936 where children chanted this slogan at a Jewish passenger in Jaffa, while the adults accompanying them kept silent. In 2021, while speaking to children, Abbas Zaki, a member of Fatah's central committee, glorified a 10-year old Palestinian child who (according to his story) encountered Ted Koppel in the West-Bank during the First Intifida, and thinking him to be an Israeli-Jew had started throwing stones at him while shouting "Palestine is our land and the Israelis are our dogs". The slogan had become part of several variants of a Palestinian children's song. One version is: "Palestine is our country, The Jews our dogs, Put one branch on top of another, May Allah break the Jews". Another version: "Palestine is our land and the Jews are our dogs. They came to our country like beggars". Another one: "The Arabs are our friends, the Jews are our dogs".

Jews are also called dogs without direct connection to the slogan. For example, in an incident in 1928 a crowd of Arabs in Jerusalem, angry that the Jews had established a screen in the Wailing Wall to separate between male and female worshipers, shouted "Death to the Jewish dogs". In the same year a group of students of Izz ad-Din al-Qassam in Haifa issued a declaration listing "Jewish dogs who dream of a national home" among the enemies of the nation.

In 1992 Yassar Arafat, who was then the PLO leader, was recorded in a conversation with PLO representative in Paris, saying: "The Jews at work. Damn their fathers. The dogs". In 2022 a video on the official Facebook page of the Fatah Commission of Information and Culture explained that a summer camp, where children received training in military order and discipline, was necessary because "our battle with the sons of dogs is long and we need a young generation".

In Joe Sacco's graphic non-fiction novel Palestine published in 2001, he describes an encounter with a Palestinian woman who told him that Catholics like him are welcome in her house, but "Jews are dogs".

In 2007 on Hamas Al Aqsa TV program for children a 3 years old child said "We don't like the Jews because they are dogs! We will fight them!". In 2014, Adli Sadeq the Palestinian ambassador to India, wrote in an op-ed in Al-Hayat Al-Jadida that the Palestinians are "on the first line of defense in the battle of humanity against the dogs". One of the participants in the 2023 Hamas-led attack on Israel was recorded saying about the victims of the attack "Jewish dogs".

In a summer camp organized by UNRWA in the West Bank in 2013 the children were taught that the Jews are the wolf that expelled the Palestinians: "Who is the wolf? The Jews! Isn't it true that the Jews are the wolf?". In 2018 the Palestinian cartoonist Omaya Joha published a cartoon of Israel as a wolf with a Star of David hanging in his ear and blood dripping from its fangs.

=== Octopuses ===
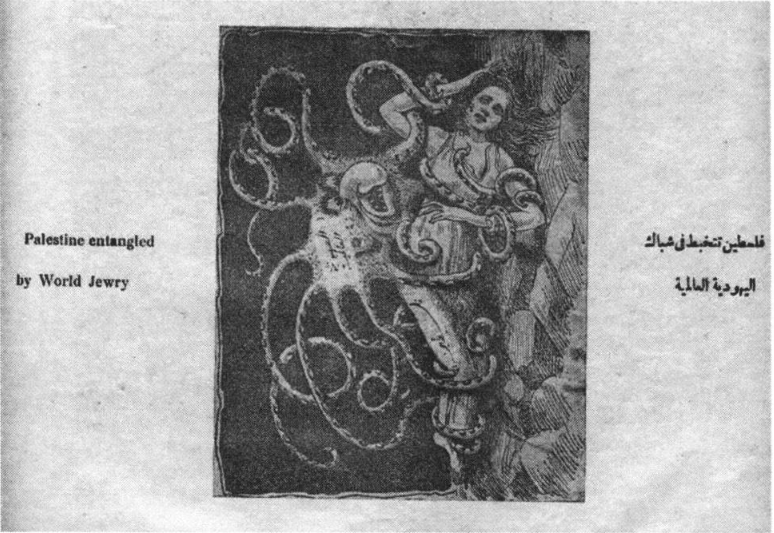
The octopus cartoon in Falastin newspaper from 1936 captioned: "Palestine entangled by World Jewry"

Octopuses are used in Palestinian propaganda against Zionism and Israel. For example, in 1936 the most widely circulated Arabic language newspaper in British Mandate Palestine, Falastin, published a caricature showing an octopus with a long nose catching in its arms a young woman, captioned "Palestine entangled by World Jewry".

In 1994, following the signing of the Oslo Accords, Hamas spokesman Ibrahim Ghawsha described Israel as "the Zionist octopus". In 2008 Hamas spokesman Sami Abu Zuhri did the same after the assassination of Imad Mughniyeh. In 2007 the Palestinian organization BADIL, that has special consultative status with UN Economic and Social Council, published a cartoon of an octopus with a blue Star of David on its head hovering over skulls.

In 2010, after the Gaza flotilla raid, the Jordanian-Palestinian cartoonist Emad Hajjaj published a cartoon of an octopus, with a Star of David, grabbing a little boat in the shape of a peace dove. Later in the 2010s several caricatures depicting Israel as an octopus appeared in Palestinian papers such as Al-Hayat al-Jadida,Al-Ayyam, Felesteen, and Al-Quds Al-Arabi. and In 2017, caricatures of Israel as octopus engulfing Al Aqsa Mosque by Gazan Palestinian cartoonist Omaya Joha appeared in Qatari newspapers.

=== Reptiles: Snakes and crocodiles ===
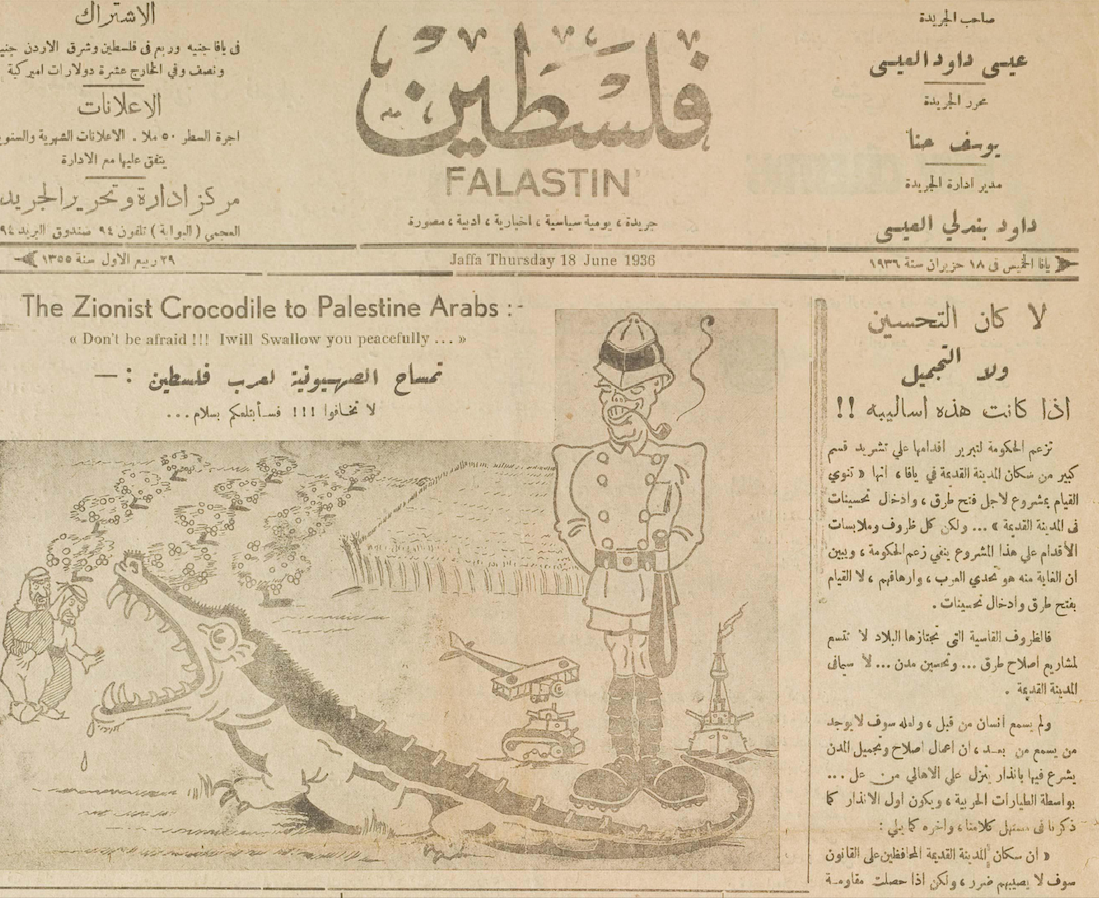
The "Zionist crocodile" cartoon in Falastin newspaper from 1936

Snakes are used in Palestinian propaganda against Israel. For example, in 1994, following the signing of the Oslo Accords Hamas published a leaflet showing a hand with Star of David offering a snake. In 2001, Emad Hajjaj, published a caricature in the Jordanian newspaper Ad Dustour in which Ehud Barak and Ariel Sharon (the contenders for prime-ministry in the Israeli 2001 elections) were portrayed as the two heads of a serpent marked by Stars of David.

In 2014 a cartoon published in Al-Hayat Al-Jadida, an official newspaper of the Palestinian Authority, depicted a snake-like skullcap-wearing Israeli (possibly Avigdor Lieberman) having his head cut off by two fingers titled "Palestinian unity" that represent the reconciliation between Fatah and Hamas. Later the same year, a caricature published in The Capital City, a bi-weekly paper distributed with Al-Hayat Al-Jadida, portrayed the Israeli right wing activist Yehuda Glick (who later became Knesset member) is depicted as a snake. Caricatures depicting all of Israel as a snake appeared in Palestinian papers such as Felesteen and Al-Ayyam. In the years 2004-2010 Palestinian Authority TV repeatedly broadcast a music video that describes Israel as "a snake coiled around the land".

Israel and Zionism are sometimes depicted in Palestinian sources as crocodiles. For example, in 1936 the most widely circulated Arabic language newspaper in British Mandate Palestine, Falastin, published a caricature showing the "Zionist crocodile" telling the Arabs "Don't be afraid! I'll swallow you peacefully". In the 21st century several caricatures depicting Israel as a crocodile marked by Star of David appeared in Palestinian papers such as Al-Quds Al-Arabi, Felesteen, Al-Quds.

=== Rats and mice ===
Rats and mice are also used in Palestinian propaganda against Zionism and Israel. For example: In 2000 Al-Hayat al-Jadida published a column saying that the settlers should become "group of rats gathering in their sewers before they are driven away into Israel". In 2014, during the kidnapping of 3 Israeli teenagers by Hamas, the Fatah posted on its facebook page a caricature showing three rats labeled with white Stars of David on them, caught on a fishing line, with the title "masterstroke".

In 2014, during a time of tensions around the Temple Mount, Fatah's Information and Culture Commission's website published a caricature of al-Aqsa mosque on the top of a mountain being eaten away by a pack of rats marked with Star of David. In 2020 the South African branch of the Palestinian led BDS movement published a cartoon depicting Israelis with rat tails and teeth eating through a piece of cheese captioned '"the West Bank & Gaza" with a sign reading "Kosher Cheese".

On several occasions since 2018, the British-Palestinian journalist Abdel Bari Atwan, former editor of Al-Quds Al-Arabi, said that when Yasser Arafat prepared to leave from Tunisia to Palestine following the signing of the Oslo Accords, Arafat told him in a meeting in Tunisia that he would live long enough to see the Jews/Israelis fleeing Palestine "like rats fleeing a sinking ship". In 2022, after a terror attack on a Tel-Aviv bar, the same Abdel Bari Atwan said that the Israelis in the event were fleeing like mice from the attacker.

=== Others ===
Israel and Zionism are sometimes depicted in Palestinian sources as vampires. This trope was copied from classic European antisemitism. For example: In 2002 the General Union of Palestinian Students in the University of Manchester circulated a pamphlet describing the Jews as vampires, based on a pro-Nazi fabrication of a speech falsely attributed to Benjamin Franklin. In 2003 a cartoon of Shaul Mofaz, who was then the Israeli defense minister, with vampire's fangs dripping blood appeared in Al-Hayat El-Jadida. In 2018 the same paper published an article saying that Gaza's "enemies and the robbers of the land and the homeland are vampires". In 2015 Manal Tamimi, a Palestinian activist who was included at the time in the UN list of "human rights defenders", posted on her Twitter account: "Vampire zionist [sic] celebrating their Kebore day [probably Yom Kippur] by drinking Palestinian bloods".

In 1992 the Islamic Movement in Israel published an article in its journal Sawt al-Haq wa al-Hurriya saying "The State of Israel is like a locust hurrying to destroy everything good". In 2009 Hamas Al-Aqsa TV broadcast a sermon saying "The Jews today are weaving their spider webs in order to encircle our nation like a bracelet encircles the wrist, and in order to spread corruption throughout the world". In 2013 a cartoon of spider in the shape of a Menorah appeared in Al-Quds Al-Arabi. In 2014 Hamas released a video clip of an anti-Israeli propaganda song "Shock Israel's Security" that contains the words (in Hebrew): "exterminate the cockroaches' nest, drive out all the Zionists". A political cartoon depicting worms with Star of David appeared in Al-Quds.

== Comparisons with diseases ==
In 1910, local Arab notables in Nablus asked the Ottoman government not to be annexed to the Jerusalem administrative district "so as not to be infected with the Zionist germ". During WW2, Haj Amin al-Husayni, who was then in exile in Germany, sometimes compared Jewishness to infectious disease and Jews to microbes, in his propaganda broadcasts to the Arab world on Nazi radio. In 1985, George Habash, founder of the Popular Front for the Liberation of Palestine, said "We will not be able to secure the future of our generations if the Zionist germ continues to exist on Arab soil". In 2010, Abdallah Jarbu, Hamas deputy minister of religious endowments, said in an interview on Hamas Al-Aqsa TV, that the Jews are "a microbe unparalleled in the world [...] They are not human beings". In the beginning of the 21st century, a Palestinian textbook for children said that the Arabs should "exterminate the Zionist germ".

In 2005 Imam Ibrahim Mudayris said in a sermon broadcast in Palestinian Authority TV: "With the establishment of the state of Israel, the entire Islamic nation was lost, because Israel is a cancer spreading through the body of the Islamic nation, and because the Jews are a virus resembling AIDS, from which the entire world suffers".

In 1988 Hamas published a communiqué saying that Israel is a "cancer which is spreading [...] and is threatening the entire Muslim world". In 1992 the Islamic Movement in Israel published an article in its journal Sawt al-Haq wa al-Hurriya saying "The Muslims are the victims of the Zionist cancer". In 2002 a child on Palestinian Authority TV said: "That evil which is found in the Jews has become a germ among us, which is a cancer that buried us and is still burying, and we are the ones who suffer from this cancer". In 2007 Palestinian Legislative Council Acting Speaker Ahmed Bahar said in a sermon on Palestinian Authority TV: "Our people was afflicted by the cancerous lump, that is the Jews, in the heart of the Arab nation". In 2018 Fathi Hamad, a member of Hamas Political Bureau and former Interior Minister of Gaza Strip, called for was the establishment of an Islamic caliphate "once the nation has been healed of its cancer—the Jews".

== See also ==
- Animal stereotypes of Palestinians in Israeli discourse
- Antisemitism in the Arab world
- Antisemitism in Islam
- Anti-Zionism
- Blood libel
- Jewish parasite stereotype
- Racism in Palestine
