= Nazzal =

Nazzal is a name of Arabic origin which is used as a surname and a masculine given name. Notable people with the name include:

== Surname ==
- Khaled Nazzal (died 1986), Palestinian militant leader
- Ranah Nazzal (born 1969), Jordanian writer and poet
- Rehab Nazzal, Palestinian-born Canadian artist
- Rima Nazzal, Palestinian politician and journalist
- Yusuf Nazzal (1937–1972), Palestinian militant leader

== Given name ==
- Nazzal al-Armouti (1924–2015), Jordanian diplomat and politician
