= Nationalsozialistischer Führungsoffizier =

Political Officers of the German Wehrmacht

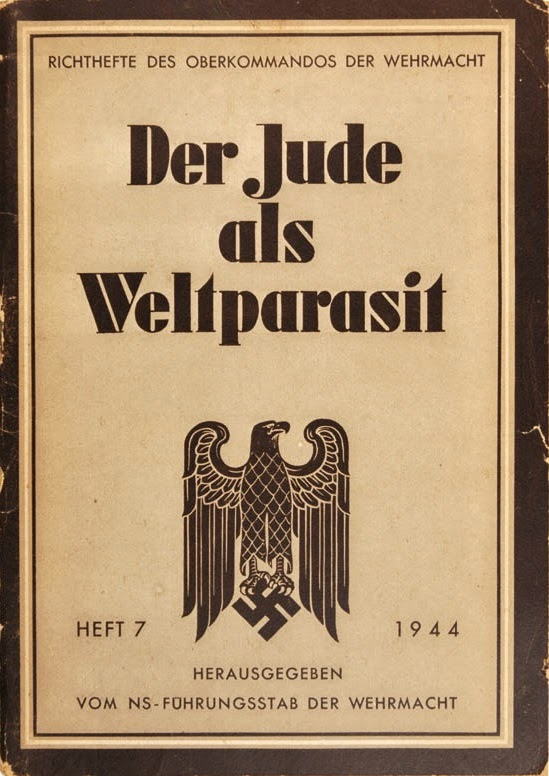
"The Jew as a parasite of the World" – title page of a training booklet of the Wehrmacht, 1944

Nationalsozialistische Führungsoffiziere (NSFO; "National Socialist Leadership Officers") were officers of the German Wehrmacht in World War II tasked with teaching Nazi ideology to soldiers. It was regarded as important that some officers should have the responsibility of both military command and political instruction in the spirit of Nazism. In this respect, NSFO were similar to Soviet political commissars of the Red Army.

== History ==
The Nationalsozialisticher Führungsstab (National Socialist leadership staff) of the OKW was created by Adolf Hitler's directive of the 22 December 1943 and was put under the overall control of General Hermann Reinecke. His officers had to bring Wehrmacht soldiers closer to the Nazi worldview through lectures and discussion. The goal was to instill ideological conviction in order to reinforce combat morale and turn the tide of the war.

NSFO were regular Wehrmacht officers, but they had to be approved by a commission created by the head of the Nazi Party Chancellery Martin Bormann. This commission, presided by Wilhelm Ruder, had to check whether the men were "flawless" in the Nazi sense. Hauptbereichsleiter Ruder explained in a speech that, in the opinion of the Party Chancellery, the instruction of "political soldiers" and of the management had been neglected and correcting this would stabilize the Wehrmacht.

"To the revolutionary will of the enemy [...], we must as of now oppose the full revolutionary power of national-socialism. [...] Wehrmacht, Party, Volkssturm: all of them are the national-socialist revolution. The German soldier thus fights as an armed national-socialist. Waging war in a purely military fashion is not enough."

By the end of the year 1944, about 47,000 secondary NSFO and 1,100 primary NSFO participated in central training courses. In regiments and battalions, officers took NSFO-functions as side duties. Up to the Division level, NSFO were provided to commanders and placed under their authority. At the Company level, unit commanders took up the function of NSFO.

NSFO teaching courses indoctrinated hundreds of thousands, perhaps millions, of men drafted in the Wehrmacht with antisemitic propaganda: for example, the idea of Jews as parasites to be wiped out.

== Literature ==
- Waldemar Besson: Zur Geschichte des nationalsozialistischen Führungsoffiziers. In: Vierteljahrshefte für Zeitgeschichte 9 (1961), H. 1, p. 76–116. ifz-Archiv (PDF)
- Andreas Kunz: Wehrmacht und Niederlage. Die bewaffnete Macht in der Endphase der nationalsozialistischen Herrschaft 1944–1945. Schriftenreihe des Militärgeschichtlichen Forschungsamtes, Bd. 64, München 2005, ISBN 3-486-57673-9, p. 240–248.
- Peter Joachim Lapp: Hitlers NS-Führungsoffiziere 1944/45. Die letzten Propagandisten des Endsiegs, Helios, Aachen 2019, ISBN 978-3-86933-238-3.
- Geoffrey Koenig, "National Socialist Officers and their Auxiliaries. Political Supervision in the Wehrmacht at the End of the Second World War (1944–1945)" in : International Journal of Military History and Historiography, 2025, DOI:10.1163/24683302-bja10096.
