= Jumah Hammad =

Palestinian writer and novelist

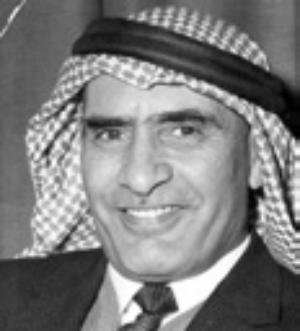
- Born: 1923; Auja al-Hafir, Beersheba Subdistrict, Palestine
- Died: 1995 (aged 71–72); Arish
- Occupation: Journalist

Jumah Hammad (Arabic: جمعة حماد) is a writer, novelist and politician who is Jordanian of Palestinian origin. He occupied many political positions. He died in 1995 in Arish.

== Early life ==
He was born in 1923 in Auja al-Hafir, Beersheba Subdistrict, Palestine. He completed his high school education in Gaza in 1942. He joined the Palestinian Security Forces in the early 1940s and worked on radio communications in Beersheba Subdistrict. He contributed to founding Beersheba Youth Front to resist the Zionist invasion in 1946. In addition, the outbreak of armed conflict prevented him from reconciling his work in Security Forces with his patriotic duty, therefore, he joined the Mujahideen in Beersheba with whom he fought a turf war in the Palestinian Revolution. Upon being accused of crimes, Hammad left to Jordan. He participated in a number of national organizations and conferences and contributed to voluntary charitable associations such as, Al-Bir Society for Martyrs Sons in Jericho in 1954.

== Career ==
He worked as the director of the World Islamic Congress in Jerusalem in 1954. He was appointed vice-president of the Jordanian Senate in 1971. In 1973, Hammad was appointed secretary-general of the Arab Union. In addition, he became a member of the National Consultative Council in 1978 and was also a member of the Charter Committee. In 1994, he was appointed Minister of Culture.

He was credited for creating a number of newspapers in the West Bank and East Bank such as, Al-Manar Daily Newspaper in Jerusalem, a newspaper that focuses on Arab heritage and Islamic ideology. He was the newspaper’s director and editor-in-chief since 1962. Al-Manar issued Al-Ofoq Al-Jadid magazine in Jerusalem in 1961 for five years. Jumah Hammad co-founded Amman Daily News in 1961. Following the decision to merge newspapers, Ad-Dustour newspaper was founded as a result of merging Al-Manar and Felestin newspaper in 1967. He was appointed editor-in-chief of Ad-Dustour newspaper from 1968 to 1972. The following year, he worked as the director-general and chairman of the board of directors of Jordan Press Foundation, which publishes Al Ra’i newspaper and The Jordan Times. He remained in the position until 1986. Hammad contributed to founding Jordan Press Association.

He was an advocate for the Palestinian cause and the Arabness of Jerusalem. During his membership in the board of trustees in the University of Jordan, he was always advising, calling for the development and support of the university and its research and studies. He viewed education as a tool for the development of society and the advancement of generations toward the stages of responsibility, placing the nation in its rightful place among nations. Upon becoming the Minister of Culture, Hammad had taken charge of improving the Ministry by opening up the doors for Arab and Jordanian writers, novelists and intellectuals.

He was the leader of unionists from the West Bank and East Bank, his office was a meeting place for prominent poets, novelists and playwrights of the Arab world, as well as Arab and foreign politicians and diplomats. He left Egypt with his colleagues Mahmoud El Sherif and Kamel El Sherif after being chased by Nasiriyah intelligence.

== Works ==
- Issues of Intellect and Life, 1974 (a study/research) (original: Qaḍāyā al-fikr wa-al-ḥayāh al-Islāmīyah)
- A Bedouin in Europe, 1977 (a novel) (original: Badawī fī Ūrūbbā)
- Signs on the Road of Islamic Action, 1982 (a study/research) (original: Shārāt ʻalā ṭarīq al-ʻamal al-Islāmī)
- The Arab-Israel Conflict, 1985 (a study/research) (original: al-ʻArab wa-al-Yahūd fī Sāḥat al-ṣirāʻ)
- The Journey of Loss, 1986 (a study/research) (original: Riḥlat al-ḍayāʻ)
- International Consensus and The Arab–Israeli Conflict, 1989 (a study/research) (original: al-wifāq al-dawlī wa-al-ṣirāʻ al-ʻArabī-al-Isrāʼīlī)

== Awards ==
- The Order of Independence, First Class.
- Supreme Order of the Renaissance, First Class.
- The Jerusalem Order for Arts.
