= Jewish parasite =

Antisemitic stereotype

The "Jewish parasite" is an antisemitic trope based on the myth that the Jews of the diaspora are incapable of forming their own states, and would therefore attack and exploit states and peoples. The stereotype is often associated with the accusation of usury, and the separation of productive capital and financial capital ("High Finance").

In the Nazi period, it served to legitimize the persecution of Jews, up to the Holocaust. Some representatives of Zionism also took up the motif. They regarded a "parasitic" way of life in other cultures as an inevitable consequence of the diaspora, and contrasted it with the establishment of a Jewish state as an ideal.

== History ==
=== From the Eighteenth Century to Holocaust ===
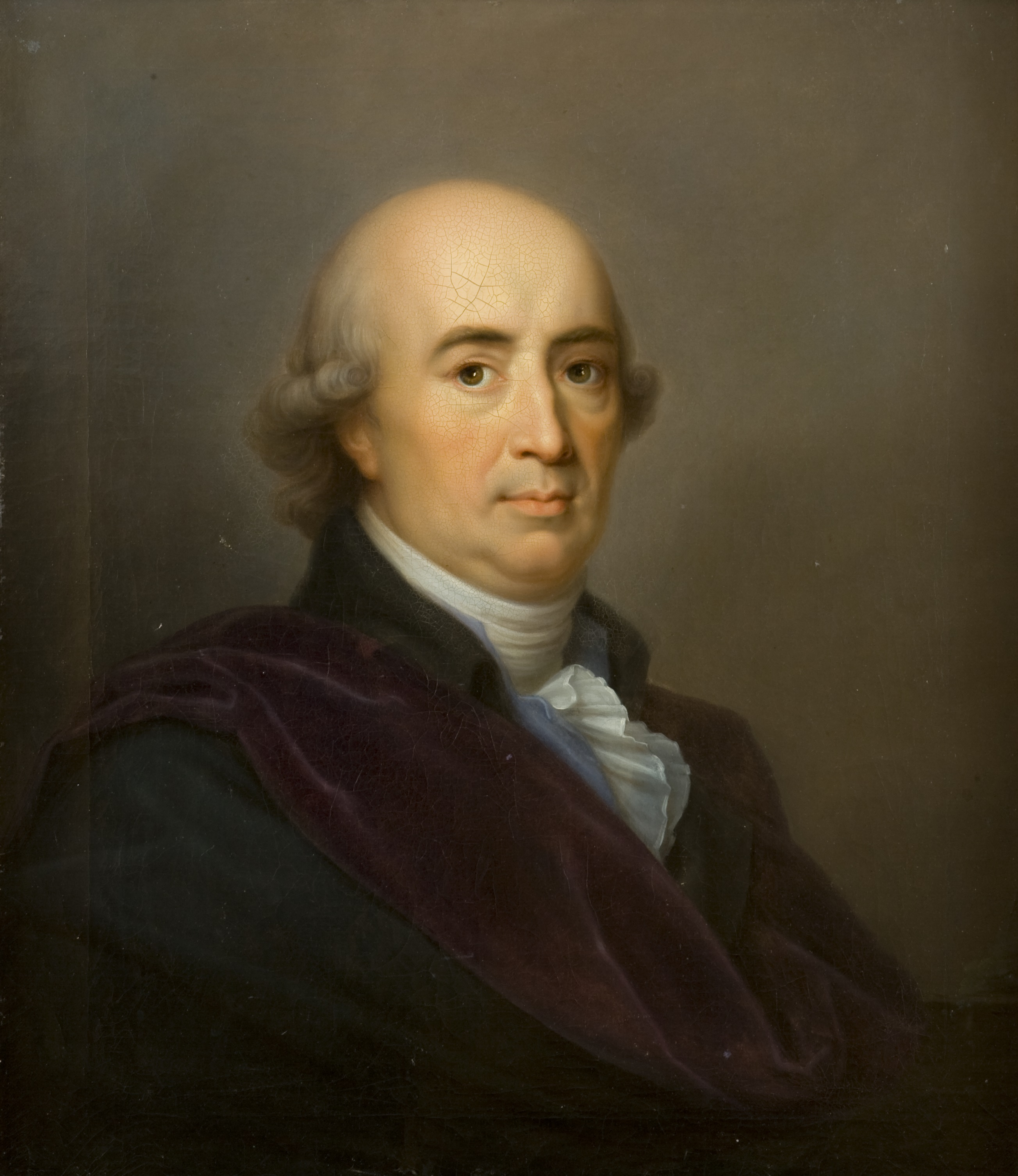
1806 portrait of Gerhard von Kügelgen

The earliest evidence of the antisemitic myth of a "Jewish parasite" can be found in the 18th century. Precursors were found by the German-Israeli historian Alexander Bein, in the medieval myth of the "usurious Jew" and the ritual murder legend according to which Jews would use the blood of Christian children for ritual purposes. In addition - for instance in Martin Luther's anti-Jewish writings - the idea can be proven that Jews are only guests in Europe, that Christians are their hosts, from which later the idea of the host people afflicted by parasites developed. The French Enlightenment philosopher Voltaire (1694–1778) explicitly denied the Jews the ability to achieve their own cultural achievements and to achieve lasting statehood: as evidence he cited the construction of the first temple, for which Solomon with Hiram of Tyre had had to engage craftsmen from Lebanon, and the double exile (first the Babylonian Exile after 597 BC and then the Diaspora after the expulsion by the Romans in 135 AD). The entire Torah would have been borrowed from ancient Oriental sources.

The German theologian and philosopher Johann Gottfried Herder (1744–1803), an important representative of Weimar Classicism, wrote in the third part of his ideas on the philosophy of the history of mankind in 1791:

"The people of God, to whom heaven itself once gave its fatherland, has been a parasitic plant on the tribes of other nations for millennia, almost since its creation; a race of clever negotiators almost all over the world who, despite all oppression, long nowhere for their own honour and home, nowhere for a fatherland".

— Johann Gottfried Herder, Ideen zur Philosophie der Geschichte der Menschheit. Dritter Teil. Zwölftes Buch. III. Hebräer

A very similar passage can also be found in the fourth part. Since Herder, an outstanding expert of the Old Testament and ancient Judaism, is considered a philosopher of the Enlightenment, the interpretation of these passages is controversial: According to the antisemitism researcher Léon Poliakov, Herder "anticipated the statements of the racists of future generations". The German literary scholar Klaus L. Berghahn believes that Herder's sympathy was only for ancient Judaism: On the other hand, he had, opposed the Jews their presence. The Polish Germanist Emil Adler, on the other hand, considers it possible - also in view of the positive remarks on Judaism a few pages before or after - that Herder only wanted to set an "apologetic counterweight": Also in other places of the ideas he had contrasted critical enlightenment formulations with conservative Orthodox thoughts and therefore weakened them in order not to endanger his position as General Superintendent of the Lutheran Church in Weimar. The Germanist Arndt Kremer points out that such language images in the 18th century were "not yet per se instrumentalized for antisemitic purposes". He contrasts them with Herder's argumentation that the alleged misdemeanours of Judaism could be explained by the anti-Jewish legislation of his time, which he described as "barbaric": "No völkisch antisemite of later times would argue like this".

In 1804, the reviewer of an anti-Jewish work by the German Enlightenment writer Friedrich Buchholz (1768–1843) picked up on the metaphor of the Jew in the Neue allgemeine Deutsche Bibliothek as "a parasitic plant that incessantly clings to a noble bush, nourishes itself from the juice". In 1834, the metaphor was directed against Jewish emancipation in an article in the journal Der Canonische Wächter: The Jews would be “a true plague of the peoples parasitically surround them”. In his polemic against Jewish emancipation, the Protestant pastor Robert Haas expressed which parasitic plant was concretely meant by this in his polemic:

"According to this the Jews are a true mistletoe plant on the tree of the state, and only to the extent that it ensures that every impurity is swept away from it and every usurious plant is removed, will the tree thrive more gloriously and bear fruit rich in blessings".

— Robert Haas

=== Economic antisemitism in the 19th century ===
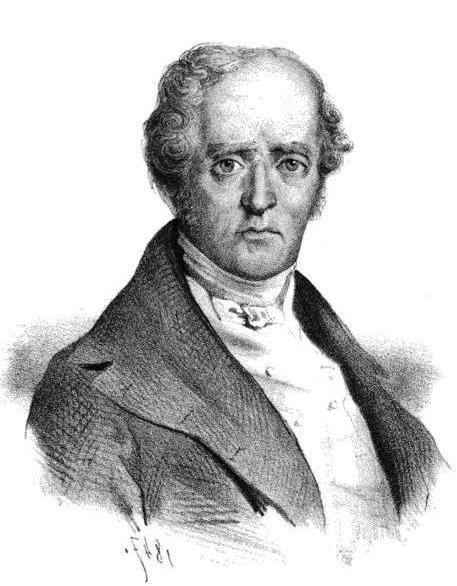
1848 lithograph of Charles Fourier by Charles Baugniet

The idea of social parasitism, in the figurative sense, has long been present in socialism. It was adopted from the physiocracy of the 18th century, which called urban merchants and manufactory owners "class stérile" in contrast to the supposedly only productive farmers. The French early socialist Charles Fourier (1772–1837), for example, described the majority of all servants, women and children as "domestic parasites", to whom he added the "social parasites", namely merchants and sailors. To these "anti-productive" populations Fourier also counted the Jews. In his 1846 work Les Juifs, rois de l'époque : histoire de la féodalité financière, his pupil Alphonse Toussenel (1803–1885) defined "the despised name of the Jew" as "any money dealer, any unproductive parasite who lives from the substance and work of others. For me, Jews, usurers, and money dealers are synonyms".

The early socialist Pierre-Joseph Proudhon (1809–1865) pointed to Fourier's antisemitism and charged him with further stereotypes. He therefore accused the Jews of crucifying Jesus Christ, of founding the Roman Catholic Church which was rejected by Proudhon, of striving for world domination and of being a "human race" that could not be assimilated. He relied here on the philosopher of religion Ernest Renan (1823–1893), who held the view that the Hebrew language was incapable of abstract conceptualization and therefore of metaphysics. All in all, Proudhon saw the Jews as symbols of capitalism, which he criticized. He wrote in 1860:

"The Jew remains a Jew, a parasite race, enemy of work, who indulges in all the customs of anarchic and lying trade, stock exchange speculation and profiteering. All trade is in the hands of the Jews; rather than the kings or the emperors, they are the sovereigns of the time".

— Pierre-Joseph Proudhon, Sa vie et sa pensée, 1809–1849.

From this he concluded in 1847 that the Jews would either have to be expelled to Asia or destroyed.

The French socialist Albert Regnard (1836–1903) saw parallels in 1890 between the antinomies of the capitalist and the proletarian on the one hand and the Jew and the Aryan on the other. The Russian anarchist Mikhail Bakunin (1814–1876) called the Jews "an exploitative sect, a people of leeches, a single-eating parasite" in 1871. They were commanded either by Karl Marx or by the Rothschilds, who was equally despised by Bakunin. According to the political scientist Klaus von Beyme, this shows that Bakunin's antisemitism was not racially motivated, but anti-capitalistic.

While the British Chartist movement in general supported the Jewish demand for equality, the situation was different in terms of its economic role. Jews were denounced by Chartists as parasites and embodiments of exploitation, who would join forces with other enemies of the working class.

=== Merge with racial antisemitism in the 19th and early 20th centuries ===
In the right-wing political spectrum, the stereotype of the "Jewish parasite" was much more widespread than in the rest of the political spectrum. The political right-wing used the stereotype with a racist rather than an anti-capitalist thrust, although both motives were present. Each time it had the function of dressing one's own antisemitic suspicions in a scientific and therefore apparently objective concept. The Ottoman-born writer Frederick van Millingen wrote in 1873 in his conspiracy-theoretical work The Conquest of the World by the Jews that Jews were "largely unproductive parasites". When more and more Jews fled from Eastern Europe to Germany and Austria in the 1880s, the depiction of the Jewish parasite and disease vector became the topos of antisemitic literature. In 1881, in his social Darwinian work Bau und Leben des sozialen Körpers, the German national economist Albert Schäffle unfolded the concept of the "social parasite", who took advantage of the labor and wealth of his "host" without contributing anything to it himself. As a particularly dangerous part of this social parasitism, he described the "proliferating" Jews as active in the credit System. The meaning of the metaphor changed with the idea of a "peoples body", into which the Jewish parasite penetrated in order to harm him. If originally meanings from botany were added to it (as with Herder), it was increasingly associated with zoology or infectiology: Now one had to imagine leeches, lice, viruses or even vampires under "Jewish parasites", which would have to be fought ruthlessly.

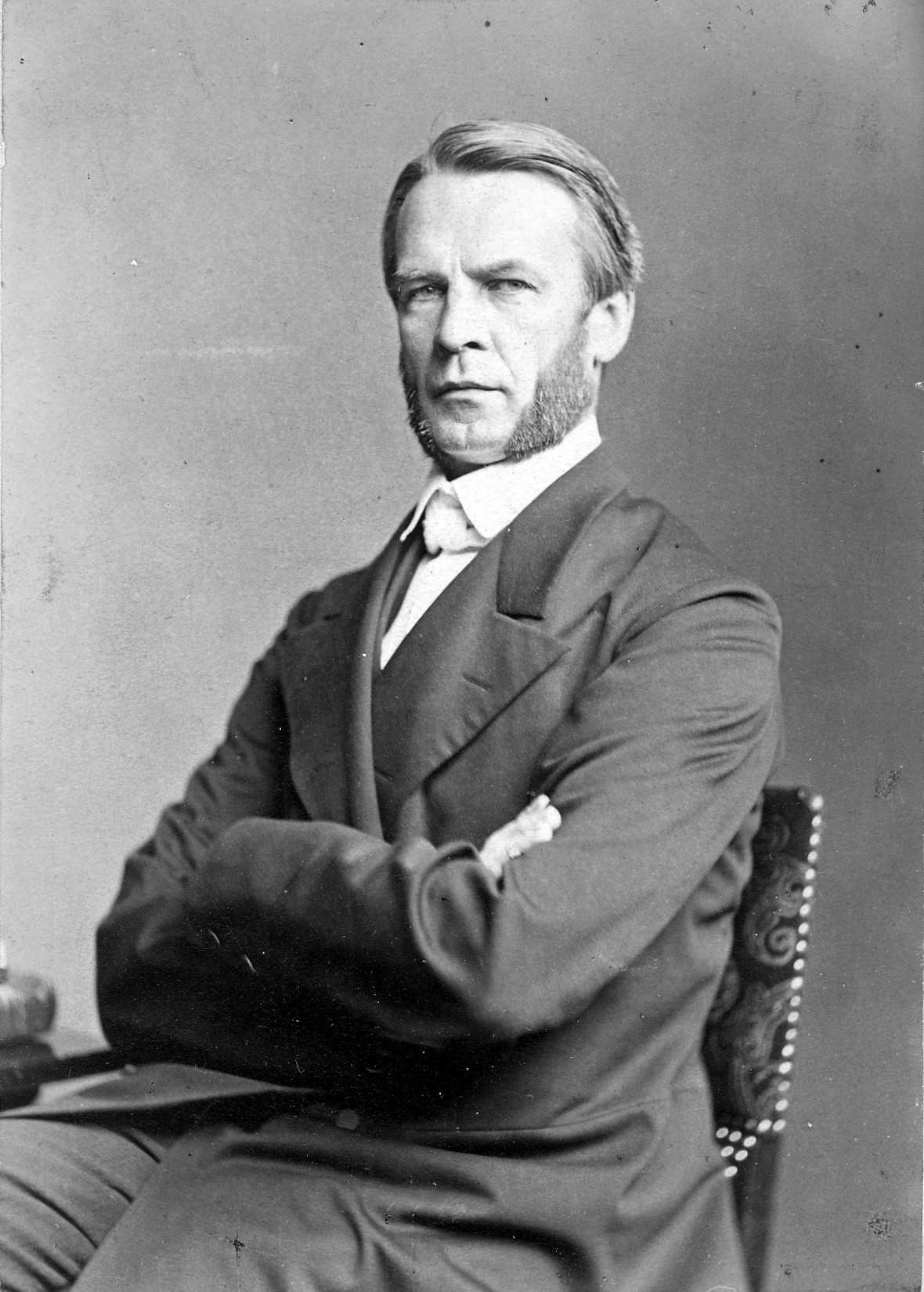
Photography of Adolf Stoecker, c. 1890

The domestic chaplain Adolf Stoecker (1835–1909), founder of the Christian Social Workers' Party, in an 1880 debate in the Prussian House of Representatives wanted only to grant the Jews a "parasitic existence" in Christian Europe and compared it with "leeches". In the following period he even considered a racial struggle and the use of force.

The German national economist Eugen Dühring (1833–1921) wrote in his 1881 work, Die Judenfrage als Racen-, Sitten- und Culturfrage (The Jewish Question as a Question of Races, Morals and Culture) that Jewish parasites would feel particularly at home in an "already corrupted peoples body". The power of this "inner Carthago" would have to break the modern populous. In the posthumously published 6th edition of 1930, he pointed out this statement even further and called for a war against the Jews:

"It is to be estimated, however, that the right of war, especially of a war against the anti-Aryan, even anti-human attacks of foreign parasites, must be different from that of peace".

Theodor Lessing referred to a statement by Dühring according to which Nordic people were obliged "to exterminate the parasitic races, as we exterminate threatening poisonous snakes and wild predators." The librarian and folk song researcher Otto Böckel (1859–1923), who sat in the Reichstag for the German Reform Party from 1887 to 1903, publicly stigmatized Jewish traders as "Jewish parasites" who had "eaten themselves into the German being".

In a similar way, the German Orientalist Paul de Lagarde (1827–1891) called in 1887 for a "surgical intervention" to remove the "mass of pus" that would have accumulated in Europe as a result of the infestation with Jewish parasites: "Trichinae and bacilli are not negotiated with, nor are trichinae and bacilli educated, they are destroyed as quickly and thoroughly as possible". Whether Lagarde was thinking of a physical extermination of the Jews is controversial in research. In Alexander Bein's view, however, these are all still biologistic comparisons and metaphors: Lagarde had not yet spoken out in favour of the extermination of the Jews, he had spoken out in pictorial language for the expropriation of the Jews. Such natural metaphors were also used in the nineteenth century without antisemitic intentions, as for example by the ancient historian Theodor Mommsen (1817–1903), who described the ancient Jews as the "ferment of decomposition", that the formation of larger state entities beyond ethnic boundaries have allowed. The Austrian political scientist Michael Ley, on the other hand, assumes that Lagarde strived for the annihilation of Jews; for him, it was in the sense of a redemption antisemitism "a necessary step on the way of salvation of the German people".

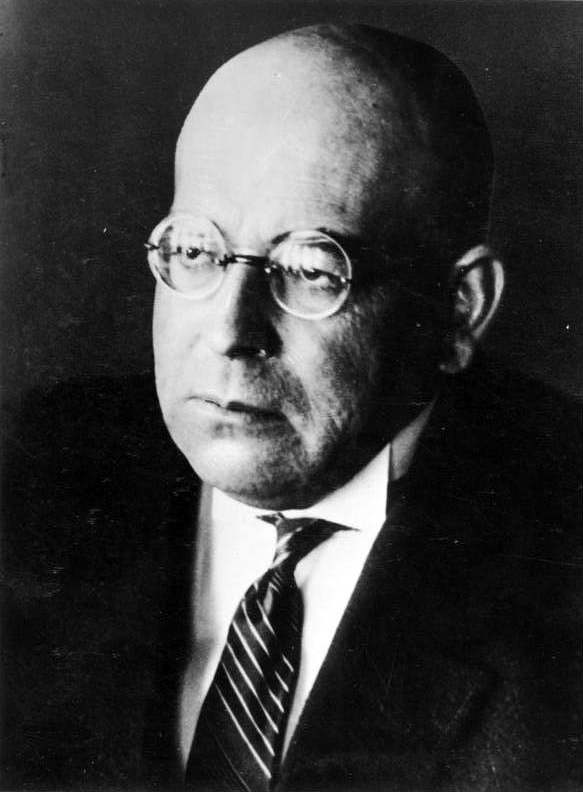
Oswald Spengler in an undated photography

According to Bein, the change from metaphor to a real-naturalistic understanding of these terms did not take place until the 20th century, when the German cultural philosopher Oswald Spengler (1880–1936), for example, used natural terms such as "growth", "withering" or "decay" to describe states, peoples and cultures in his main work The Decline of the West. He described Judaism as a "decomposing element" which had a destructive effect "wherever it intervenes". Jews were incapable of adapting to Western civilization and constituted a foreign body in Europe. The repeated use of the term host people with reference to the nations in which Jews live suggests the idea that they are parasites, although Spengler himself did not use the term. The journalist Theodor Fritsch (1852–1933), in his Handbuch der Judenfrage (Handbook of the Jewish Question), first published in 1907, painted the stereotype of the "Jewish parasite", who would endanger the life of his "host people" if he was not expelled. By insinuating that the alleged parasitic Jew was Mimicry in a further biologistic metaphor, he contributed to the fact that the hatred of the Jews was subsequently and also precisely directed against assimilated Jews.

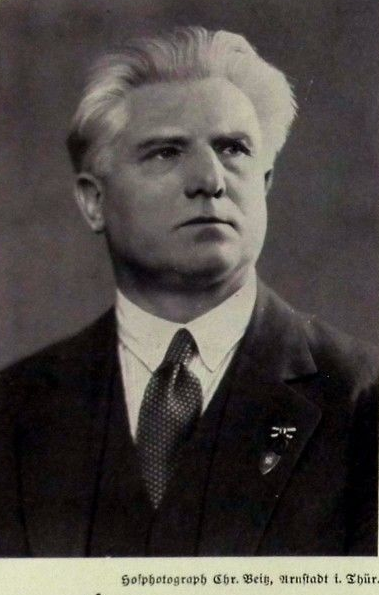
Pre-1935 photography of Artur Dinter by Christian Beitz

A variant of antisemitic parasitology was offered by the völkisch writer Artur Dinter, who in 1917 developed the so-called impregnation theory in his novel Die Sünde gegen das Blut (The Sin Against the Blood), according to which Jews were also "pests on the German body of the people", meaning non-Jewish women who had once been pregnant by a Jew were no longer able to "give birth to children of their own race", even with a non-Jewish partner. This theory was later taken up and further developed by the Nazis and played an important role in the discussions that preceded the 1935 Nuremberg Race Laws.

The stereotype was also disseminated in other countries. In France, for example, the journalist Édouard Drumont (1844–1917) claimed in his conspiracy-theoretical work La France Juive, published in 1886, that the "Jewish parasite" spread infectious diseases among the Aryan, "noble races" against which he himself was immune, since "the chronic plague [him] inherent in him protected him from any acute infection". Unlike those Jews were not capable of creative achievements. Therefore, they could survive only as parasites, namely as bankers and usurers who would weaken the French more and more. Drumont proposed an aryanization of Jewish property as the solution.

In 1937, the antisemitic writer Louis-Ferdinand Céline (1864–1961), in his Bagatelles pour un massacre, published in Germany in 1938 under the title Die Judenverschwörung in Frankreich (The Jewish Conspiracy in France), took up the accusations of the early Socialists and denounced "the Jew" as "the most intransigent, most voracious, most corrosive parasite". He expanded the metaphor by equating it with a cuckoo, a breeding parasite that does not build its own nests, but hatches its young from other birds, raises them, and lets their young die.

The stereotype was also widespread in the Russian Empire and served to justify acts of violence against Jews. During the expulsion of the Jews from Moscow in 1891, Konstantin Petrovich Pobedonostsev, a close advisor to Tsar Alexander III, to an English guest, declared:

"The Jew is a parasite. Remove him from the living organism in and on which he lives, and place this parasite on a rock - and he will die".

— Konstantin Pobedonostsev, 1891

Around 1900, the journalist Pavel Alexandrovich Krushevan (1860–1909), a member of the Black Hundreds, regularly rioted against the Jews in the magazine Bessarabetz, calling them "bloodsuckers, fraudsters, parasites and exploiters of the Christian population". Against this background, an unsolved murder case, which he described as a Jewish ritual murder, led to a pogrom in Chișinău in March 1903, in which about 46 Jews were killed.

=== Antisemitism after 1945 ===
The stereotype of the Jewish parasite can also be traced in antisemitism after 1945. In 1947 the Berliner Illustrierte interpreted the abbreviation "D.P.". (Displaced Persons, meaning people liberated from concentration camps and forced labour camps) as "Deutschlands Parasiten" (Germany's parasites).

A linguistic analysis of letters to the Central Council of Jews in Germany and the Israeli Embassy in Berlin from 2002 to 2012 showed the unbroken liveliness of the stereotype of the Jewish parasite in the present Among neo-Nazis, these metaphors are widely used to describe Jews and foreigners. According to Bernhard Pörksen, such animal metaphors serve the attempt to "create disgust and lower inhibitions of Extermination" According to the 2007 analysis by Albert Scherr and Barbara Schäuble, the antisemitic "topos of parasites, impurities and blood", to which the stereotype "Jewish parasite" can be attributed, is also taken up in media discourses as well as by contemporary young people in narratives and argumentations.

After the collapse of the Soviet Union, Eurasianism gained influence in Russia, claiming that a genetic unity of the peoples of Eurasia had to be established, since they were threatened by chimerical, parasitic influences - namely by the Khazars, a medieval Turkic people of Jewish faith.

The stereotype can also be found in antisemitism, which is widespread in Islamic countries in connection with the Middle East conflict. After the Iranian Revolution in 1979, wealthy Jews in the country were accused of exploiting their Muslim workers as "bloodsuckers" and transferring the profits for arms purchases to Israel. The Iranian television series Zahra's Blue Eyes, first broadcast in 2004, claims that Jews steal the organs of Palestinian children. The Jewish organ recipients are portrayed as not viable without the body parts of their victims, which Klaus Holz and Michael Kiefer interpret as picking up the parasite stereotype. Jews par excellence would not be viable without the host people, just as parasites need a host. At the International Holocaust Cartoon Competition organized by the Iranian newspaper Hamshahri, a drawing was submitted in which Jews were portrayed as worms infesting an apple.

== Within political movements ==
=== Nazism ===
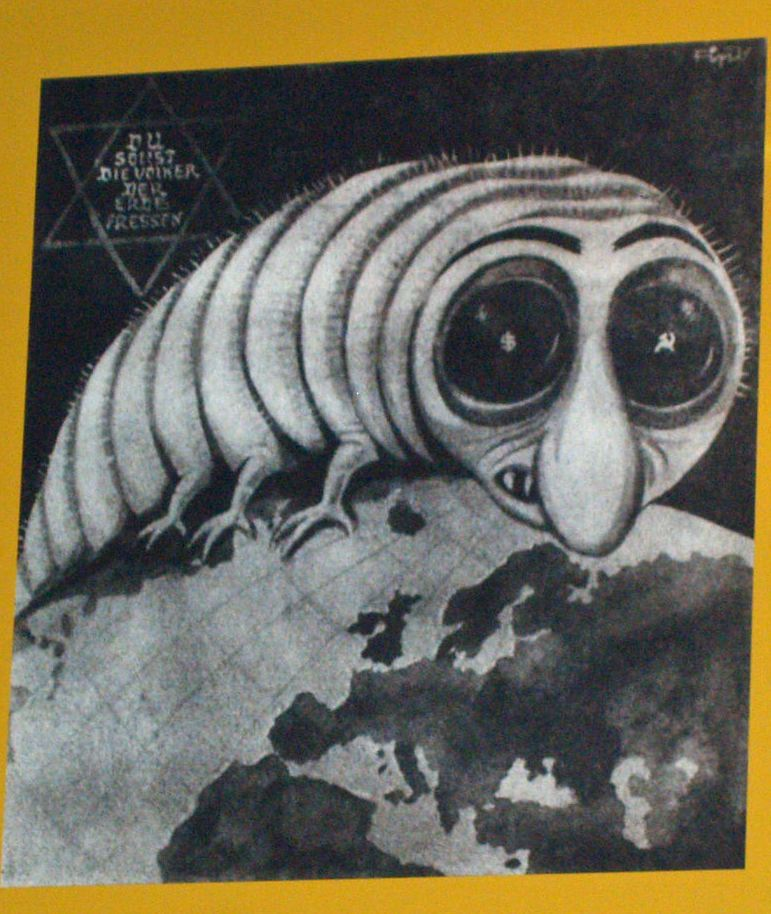
Caricature from Der Stürmer, September 1944: A monstrous vermin – bearing a stereotypical Jewish nose, reflecting a dollar sign in one eye and a hammer and sickle in the other (representing Capitalism and Communism), and labeled with a star of David – crawls over the earth. The text ("Thou shalt eat the nations of the earth") was purported to be a passage from the Hebrew Bible.

Nazism replaced the basic Marxist contradiction between the bourgeoisie and the proletariat with that between "worker" and "parasite". The identification of Jews with parasites, pests, germs, vermin, etc. is very common here. Its purpose was to dehumanize and segregate the Jewish population. Alexander Bein sees in the discourse of the "Jewish parasite", who understood his biologistic terminology not metaphorically but literally, one of the semantic causes of the Holocaust.

Adolf Hitler (1889–1945) repeatedly picked up the stereotype in 1924–25 for his program manifesto Mein Kampf. For example, he polemicized against the widespread idea in antisemitic literature that the Jews were nomads, as he himself had described them in a speech on August 13, 1920. Now he denied that this designation would be correct:

"[The Jew] is and remains the eternal parasite, a parasite that spreads more and more like a harmful bacillus, as well as inviting only a favourable culture medium. The effect of its existence, however, is similar to that of parasites: where it occurs, the host people die after a shorter or longer time."

— Adolf Hitler, Mein Kampf

In this argumentation any possibility of naturalization for Jews was excluded, because this would only allow the alleged parasite to penetrate deeper into the body of the people. The antisemitic weekly paper Der Stürmer used this stereotype in 1927 to deny Jews their right to life. The Jews were equated with locusts:

"The Jewish people are forced by their blood not to live from honest creative work, but from fraud and usury. It is known as a people of idiots and deceivers. The Jewish people are the largest parasite people in the world. It is not worth that it exists."

— Der Stürmer

Also in 1927, a Nazi poster that advertised an event with Gregor Strasser, referred to the frequent objection that Jews were also human beings, and gave the cynical answer: "The flea is also an animal, though not a pleasant one". In the text of the poster, the equation with an insect that transmits diseases was further increased by describing Jews as vampires, i.e. not only as a nuisance, but as a deadly danger. In the same year, the Nazi journalist Arno Schickedanz (1892–1945) unfolded the stereotype fin his scrip of Sozialparasitismus im Völkerleben (Social parasitism in peoples' lives). It was cited by the ideologist of the Nazi Party (NSDAP), Alfred Rosenberg (1892–1946), in 1930 in his Mythus of the 20th Century. In it he alleged that the Jews, supposedly on a "strictly scientific" basis, deliberately sought national weaknesses in order to be able to eat themselves through this "wound" into the body of the "host", as for instance the sack cancer used the anus of the edible crab to penetrate it and eat it from the inside. At the same time he identified the intruder with Ahasver, the Eternal Jew, who was condemned to homelessness, just waiting for his enemies to show themselves weak. He could therefore never lay aside his parasitic behavior:

"If somewhere the power of a Nordic spiritual flight begins to weaken, the earth-heavy being Ahasvers sucks itself to the weakening muscles; where any wound is torn open on the body of a nation, the Jewish demon always eats himself into the sick spot and uses the weak hours of the greats of this world as a parasite. It is not his senses as a hero fighting for dominion, but rather making the world 'interest-bearing' that guides the dreamlike strong parasite. His law is not to argue, but to conquer; not to serve values, but to exploit devaluation, according to which he can begin and from which he can never escape - as long as he exists"

— Cornelia Schmitz-Berning

Reich Propaganda Minister Joseph Goebbels (1897–1945) expressed similar views in a speech on April 6, 1933: The Jews were "a completely foreign race" with "markedly parasitic characteristics". In a radio broadcast in January 1938, the Nazi Walter Frank raised the conflict with the "parasite" Judaism to a religious level: It could not be understood without classifying it in the world-historical process "in which God and Satan, creation and decomposition lie in eternal struggle" Hitler himself depicted in a Reichstag speech on 26 April 1942 the globally perishable consequences of the Jews' alleged striving for world domination:

"What then remains is the animal in man and a Jewish stratum that has been brought to power as a parasite, which in the end destroys its own breeding ground. To this process of, as Mommsen says, the decomposition of the peoples pursued by the Jews, the young awakening Europe has now declared war"

— Saul Friedländer

On 16 May 1942, he used the stereotype as a counter-argument against bourgeois protests against the deportation of Jews from Germany in a table discussion: As a parasite, the Jew could live "in contrast to the German in Lapland just as well in the tropics", there was no reason at all for crocodile tears.

The Nazi discourse on the "Jewish parasite" was supplemented by further equations of Jews with pathogens, rats or vermin, as can be seen in Fritz Hippler's propaganda film Der Ewige Jude from 1940. He therefore continued the anti-Jewish writings of Martin Luther (1483–1546), who had insulted the Jews as the "pestilence" of Christians. This accusation had been taken up in the 20th century by antisemites such as the Thule Society and also by Hitler himself, who during the war against the Soviet Union took advantage of the impending extermination of "this plague" (meant was the alleged Jewish Bolshevism) as a grateful achievement. In May 1943, in a conversation with Goebbels, he picked up the stereotype once again and varied it by another pest: this time he equated the Jews with potato beetles, which one could also ask oneself why they existed at all. He gave the answer himself in the social Darwinian sense: nature was dominated by the "law of struggle". Parasitic phenomena would "accelerate this struggle and intensify the selection process between the strong and the weak". But civilized high-ranking peoples would regularly underestimate this danger due to instinctive weakness: "So there is nothing left to the modern peoples but to exterminate the Jews".

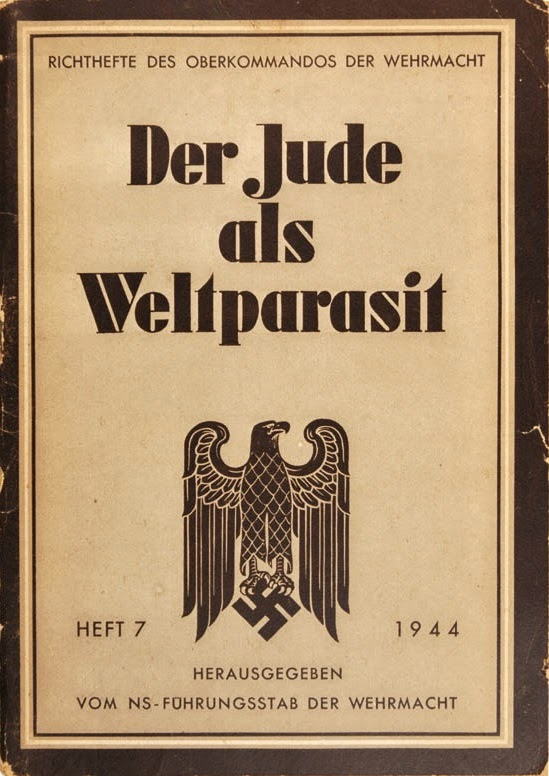
Title page of a training booklet of the Wehrmacht, 1944

Through this comparison with parasites, pests and diseases the Jews were systematically denied to be human beings. Nazi propaganda was able to tie in here with the medieval image of the Jew as a well poisoner. However, these comparisons became much more important as a result of the more widespread knowledge of medicine and hygiene in the 20th century. The only solution that remained in this logic was the physical extermination of the alleged pests, the Holocaust. In the Nazi training literature, this consequence was repeatedly openly addressed. For example, in "Training Foundations for the Reich Themes of the NSDAP for the Year 1941/42" it was stated that a body infested with bacteria had to overcome these parasites, or it was overcome by them. He then had to take care to prevent a new infection in the future. This is also the case in people's lives:

"Humanitarian principles cannot be used at all in such disputes and processes, just as they cannot be used to disinfect a body or a contaminated space. Here a completely new way of thinking must take place. Only such thinking can really lead to the final decision which must be taken in our time in order to secure the existence of the great creative race and its great task in the world"

— Cornelia Schmitz-Berning

With the propaganda of the "Jews as world parasites", Wehrmacht members were indoctrinated hundreds of thousands of times by their Nazi command officers until the last months of the Second World War. As late as 1944, posters were stuck in the General government showing rats in front of a star of David with the inscription: "Żydzi powracają wraz z bolszewizmen" (German: "Die Juden kehren mit dem Bolschewismus zurück"). This was intended to mobilize antisemitic resentments of the Polish population against the advancing Red Army and to prevent further resistance against the German occupation.

=== Zionism ===
The description of Jews as parasites can be found under other notions since the beginning of the 20th century also in Zionism. Aharon David Gordon (1856–1922), an organizer of the Second Aliyah from the Ukrainian Zhytomyr, wrote:

"We are a parasitic people. We have no roots in the ground, there is no reason under our feet. And we are parasites not only in economic sense, but also in spirit, in thought, in poetry, in literature, in our virtues, our ideals, our higher human aspirations. Every foreign movement sweeps us with itself, every wind in the world carries us. We ourselves are almost non-existent, which is why we are of course nothing in the eyes of other peoples."

— Aharon David Gordon

This polemic was fed by the idea that Jews could develop an independent culture and identity by moving to Israel alone. According to the Israeli political scientist Zeev Sternhell, hatred of diaspora culture was something like "a methodological necessity for Zionism". Gordon described as parasites all those who do not stand on their own two feet and live on their own hands for work. He also saw this inactivity spreading among the Yishuv, the Jewish population in Palestine. In order to form the Jewish nation, one had to "wage war" against it and against every other form of parasitism.

Zionists and "Halutzim", the pioneers of Jewish repopulation, mystified the soil and the handiwork with which it was cultivated: In a travelogue, Hugo Herrmann (1887–1940) described the almost liberating zeal of the previous "airmen, parasites, traders and hagglers" after their entry into Eretz Israel. The co-founder of the Zionist World Organization Max Nordau (1849–1923) formulated the ideal of the "muscle Jew", whereby he did not fall back on the parasite metaphor, but according to the Austrian historian Gabriele Anderl his statements and those of other Zionist theorists can be understood "from today's point of view also as an internalization of the antisemitic caricature of the Jew as unproductive parasite".

In Israel, the accusation of parasitism is sometimes made against ultra-Orthodox Jews who are exempt from military service.

== See also ==
- Blood libel
- Rootless cosmopolitan
- Jews and Israelis as animals in Palestinian discourse

== Bibliography ==
- Alexander Bein: „Der jüdische Parasit. In: Vierteljahrshefte für Zeitgeschichte, 13 (1965), Issue 2, pp. 121-149 (online available).
- Cornelia Schmitz-Berning: „Vokabular des Nationalsozialismus“, s.v. Parasit und parasitär. Walter de Gruyter, Berlin / New York 2007, ISBN 978-3-11-092864-8, pp. 460–464.
- Julius H. Schoeps: Zur „Judenfrage“: „Als sie zu Ratten wurden … Die Geschichte einer Verhetzung“. In: Die Zeit, No. 43/1980.
