= Asma al-Ghul =

Palestinian journalist

Asmaa al-Ghoul
- أسماء الغول
- Born: 17 January 1982 (age 44); Rafah, Gaza Strip
- Occupation: Journalist

Asmaa al-Ghoul (born 17 January 1982; Arabic: أسماء الغول sometimes spelt "al Ghul") is a journalist and secular feminist known for her outspoken criticism of "the corruption of Fatah and the terrorism of Hamas." Described by The New York Times as a woman "known for her defiant stance against the violations of civil rights in Gaza," al-Ghoul currently resides in Southern France. She maintains a substantial social media presence through her self-styled channel, where she regularly shares significant breaking news stories.

Throughout her career, al-Ghoul has contributed articles to various reputable publications, including the Washington, D.C.–based Al Monitor, Al Ayyam, Le Monde, Al Quds, Amine, and spearheaded the opening of the Palestinian office for the Emirati magazine Woman of Today. She has also worked with Lebanon's Samir Kassir Foundation, which advocates for media freedom.

Recognized for her literary achievements and advocacy, al-Ghoul has been honored with several prestigious awards, including the Courage in Journalism Award from the International Women’s Media Foundation. Notably, at the age of 18, she received the Palestinian Youth Literature Award. In 2010, she was granted the Hellman/Hammett award by Human Rights Watch in recognition of her courageous expression of dissenting views.

== Early life ==
Born on 17 January 1982 in a Rafah refugee camp in the southern part of the Gaza Strip, al-Ghoul was the eldest of nine siblings. She grew up in a society dominated by political strife, corruption, and male chauvinism. However, amidst these challenges, she also experienced a profound sense of humanity and resilience among her people.

al-Ghoul's roots trace back to a family deeply entrenched in the Palestinian struggle. Her grandparents came to Rafah as refugees from the village of Sarafand al-Amar, following the Nakba in 1948. Sarafand al-Amar holds historical significance, as it was the site of a massacre by British troops in 1918.

In late 2003, al-Ghoul married an Egyptian poet. It was a "love marriage", which challenged the arranged marriage tradition practiced by most Gazans. The couple relocated to Abu Dhabi and had a son named Naser. However, the marriage ended after a year and a half, prompting her return to Gaza with their son, where she would continue her journey as a journalist and activist.

In a significant personal decision in 2006, al-Ghoul made the choice to permanently discard her Islamic head covering (hijab), much to the dismay of certain relatives and acquaintances. She expressed her rationale for this decision by stating, "I didn’t want to be two characters—one secular, the other Islamic." Asma found solace in the support of her immediate family, particularly her father, an engineering professor at Gaza's Islamic University, who championed her autonomy. Reflecting on her experience, she remarked, "If your father or husband is secular, only then can you be free".

== Career and activism ==
In 2007, shortly after the Hamas takeover of the Gaza Strip, al-Ghoul, who had been a journalist since 2001, traveled to South Korea for her formal training in journalism. During her time there, she penned an open letter to her uncle, a prominent member of Hamas. Titled "Dear Uncle, Is This the Homeland We Want?" the letter reflected on memories shared with her uncle while growing up. Recalling instances where her family home was used to interrogate and mistreat members of the political group Fatah, al-Ghoul sharply criticized her uncle for his complicity in the oppression of Gaza by imposing Hamas’ Islamic ideology on the masses. With the article, al-Ghoul found her voice as a human rights and social issues reporter.

However, following the publication of her article, al-Ghoul faced severe backlash, including disownment and death threats from her uncle. Hamas authorities barred her return to Gaza. Despite familial pressures urging her to apologize and cease writing, al-Ghoul remained steadfast in her resolve to continue her work. After a brief period in Egypt, she returned to Gaza, where she resumed her journalistic pursuits.

In 2009, al-Ghoul reported being stopped and interrogated by Hamas after walking on a public beach near the Al-Shati refugee camp in Gaza with a man. Then, she was wearing a T-shirt and jeans with no headscarf, and they were laughing. The Associated Press reported that this incident marked the first time since coming to power in 2007 that Hamas attempted to punish a woman for behavior it deemed 'un-Islamic'. Following the incident, al-Ghoul stated that her male friends were detained for several hours, subjected to beatings, and coerced into signing statements pledging not to violate "public moral standards" again. Hamas officials, however, denied the occurrence of this incident.

In February 2011, al-Ghoul recounted being physically assaulted while covering a rally expressing solidarity between Palestinians and Egyptians. In March of that same year, al-Ghoul, along with seven other female Palestinian journalists, claimed they were subjected to beatings and torture by Hamas security forces while attempting to cover rallies advocating for Hamas to pursue a peaceful reconciliation with Fatah. Subsequently, the Hamas government issued apologies for some of the attacks and pledged to launch an investigation into the matter.

On August 3, 2014, at least nine members of al-Ghoul's family perished in an Israeli airstrike in Rafah. Reflecting on the profound impact of this loss, al-Ghoul penned an essay titled Never Ask Me About Peace Again, documenting her experiences and emotions following the devastating event.

Her memoir, co-authored by Selim Nassib, titled 'L'insoumise de Gaza' was published in 2016. The work was subsequently translated into English by Mike Mitchell and published in 2018 under the title 'A Rebel in Gaza: Behind the Lines of the Arab Spring, One Woman’s Story'.' This memoir offers insights into al-Ghoul's experiences and perspectives, providing readers with a compelling narrative of her life and the tumultuous events surrounding the Arab Spring.
