= Dehumanization of Palestinians in Israeli discourse =

Part of the Israeli–Palestinian conflict

Some Israeli politicians, media figures, military officials, and other public voices have used zoomorphic and otherwise subhuman rhetoric to describe Palestinians. This kind of dehumanization is commonplace on both sides of the Israeli–Palestinian conflict. The Israeli rhetoric classifies Palestinians as non-human species, such as "animals," "vermin," or "insects"

A recurrent metaphor, going back to a statement by former Prime Minister Ehud Barak in 1996 which pictured Israel, a "vanguard of culture against barbarism" as a flourishing "villa in the jungle", implied that those outside the villa's grounds were wild beasts. Ariel Sharon's son Gilad Sharon stated that the aim of 2012 Gaza War in November 2012 was "a Tarzan-like cry that lets the entire jungle know in no uncertain terms just who won, and just who was defeated". (Note: Benny Morris, alluding to Ariel Sharon's Israeli West Bank barrier, commented: "Something like a cage has to be built for them. I know that sounds terrible. It is really cruel. But there is no choice. There is a wild animal there that has to be locked up in one way or another." Benjamin Netanyahu picked up the simile of Arabs as "beasts of prey" to be fenced off from the villa in remarking: "At the end, in the State of Israel, as I see it, there will be a fence that spans it all. I'll be told, 'this is what you want, to protect the villa?' The answer is yes. Will we surround all of the State of Israel with fences and barriers? The answer is yes.") According to Neve Gordon, who has spoken about statements which have been made during the ongoing Gaza war, Israel's military conflicts with Palestinians are frequently framed in terms of a conflict between civilized Israeli soldiers who are serving in the most moral army on earth and their adversaries, Palestinians, who are perceived as 'human animals' incapable of grasping the rules of war. (Note: "Alongside this legal discourse, Israel also circulates a colonial narrative that presents the Palestinians as 'human animals' that do not understand the laws of war. By combining these colonial tropes and 'legalese', it frames Palestinians as immoral barbarians who 'deserve to die'. This rhetorical move, in turn, construes Israeli soldiers as the opposite, namely, the 'civilised' and moral 'fighters'" (Gordon 2023).)

With the aid of similes, Israel's wars have frequently been likened to battles with an adversarial creature. Such comparisons have been used frequently during Israel's conflict with Palestinians in Gaza, who have variously been depicted as "ants", "fish" or "sitting ducks". IDF Soldiers who have spoken about the military operations which they have conducted in the Gaza Strip have compared them to burning up ants with a magnifying glass or shooting guns into a barrel which is crammed with fish. (Note: "You feel like a child playing around with a magnifying glass burning up ants". "Most casualties were inflicted on Palestinians by air strikes, artillery fire, and snipers from afar", a pair of soldiers recalled a year after the invasion."Combat victory? Shooting fish in a barrel is more like it". Walt Rostow likened the Israeli victory in the Six-Day War of 1967 to a "turkey shoot". Seib, alluding to Gideon Levy's reportage on the Gaza wars, writes of the "sitting duck nature of the Gaza Strip and its inhabitants".) Gaza itself has been called "a hornets' nest" or "nest of wasps" (by Moshe Dayan), as has Ain el-Hilweh, the Palestinian refugee camp in Lebanon.

== Palestinians as generic "animals" ==
"Animal" without any specific taxonomic distinction has been used to abuse Palestinians, a usage that extends to prominent Jewish leaders. The term "sub-human" and denials that the Arabs are human occur regularly. In the immediate aftermath of the Six-Day War in 1967, Robin Maxwell-Hyslop revealed in talks with the former Israeli ambassador to Burma David Hacohen that he took exception to the vehemence of Hacohen's descriptions of Arabs, likening their tenor to what Julius Streicher wrote about Jews. Hacohen replied: "But they are not human beings, they are not people, they are Arabs". (Note: "Six weeks after that war six hon. Members of this House, three from each side, including myself, went to Israel and to Jordan as the guests of those countries. There was a horrifying moment for me. We were all present as guests at lunch of the Foreign Affairs Committee of the Knesset in Jerusalem. After lunch the chairman of the Foreign Affairs Committee of the Knesset spoke with great intemperance and at great length to us about the Arabs. When he drew breath I was constrained to say, 'Doctor Hacohen, I am profoundly shocked that you should speak of other human beings in terms similar to those in which Julius Streicher spoke of the Jews. Have you learned nothing?' I shall remember his reply to my dying day. He smote the table with both hands and said, 'But they are not human beings, they are not people, they are Arabs.' He was speaking of the Arab refugees." (Maxwell-Hyslop 1973, p. 502)) The sense that Israelis considered and treated them like animals became widespread among Palestinians during the First Intifada.

At times, denigrators can allow that they are human: Yonathan Netanyahu considered them cavemen, (Note: "a rabble of cave dwellers" (Shatz 2018)) while the Likud MP Oren Hazan allows that Palestinians are human, but only insofar as they are morons. (Note: Likud MK Oren Hazan stated that "We're gonna shut your mouths and we're going to speak the truth. There is no Palestinian People. And there has never been a Palestinian People [in Hebrew, am ha'Falastinai]". However, he continued, "There is a Palestinian Moron, (in vulgar Hebrew slang, Ama Falastinai). And you will stay a Palestinian Moron. And you know that even Ama (a brand of dish detergent liquid) is worth more than the Palestinians. There is no Palestinian people. And there has never been a Palestinian people." However, "there is a Palestinian moron" (Burston 2017).) Following the October 7th attacks, Dan Gillerman, former Israeli ambassador to the United Nations (2003–2008) expressed his perplexity at world sympathy for Palestinians, stating to Sky News that they were "inhuman animals". (Note: "I am very puzzled by the constant concern which the world is showing for the Palestinian people and is actually showing for these horrible, inhuman animals who have done the worst atrocities that this century has seen". "I don't remember people shedding tears for the Taliban," he added. (Kasim 2023).)

As early as 1985 Adir Cohen's content analysis of 520 Israeli children's books (An ugly face in the mirror: National Stereotypes in Hebrew children's literature) found that 86 works depicted Palestinians as "inhuman, war lovers, devious monsters, bloodthirsty dogs, preying wolves, or vipers". Twenty years later, in 2005, another study by Daniel Bar-Tal and Yona Teichman found that 10% of the drawings in a sample of children asked to sketch a typical Arab depicted them as animals. They also found extensive evidence that Israeli children, when asked about Arabs, spoke of them in terms of pigs and other animals (as well as "barbarians", "Nazis" and murderers).

In an interview for Channel 2, the settler Elisheva Federman, wife of extremist Noam Federman, used this descriptor in prefacing her reasons for giving Palestinians an option, either leave or be killed. (Note: "We are talking about people who are sub-humans... there is nothing to be done except for throwing them out of here, and not to Jordan, but far, because if they're in Jordan they will try to return. As far as possible." She continued: "I say in the best circumstances we need to expel them ... If they don't leave? We'll kill them... They're enemies. We have to fight them. If they don't leave, we'll start bombing them. That's the only thing that will help... We don't need to put on airs. We're in a war. A la guerre, comme à la guerre - we must act as if we're in a war. Federman explained: 'The entire Arab street supports the suicide bomber... everyone is complicit in such an act. We can give them an ultimatum to leave here with their possessions intact, and if not, we'll simply send... planes and bomb them and hold on to our land.' In remarks made off the record, Federman asserted: 'Whoever wants to remain alive should leave, and whoever doesn't will be killed'." (Cohen-Almagor 2012, p. 52)) According to Noam Chomsky, a key feature of the occupation has been a pattern of humiliation of Araboushim (a pejorative term for Arabs similar to "nigger" or "kike") (Note: Noting Moshe Dayan's point that Palestinians will live like dogs if they choose to stay, and Menachem Begin's description of them as "two-legged beasts", Chomsky argues his view that the "hallmark of the occupation has been humiliation and degradation" of Araboushim who are regularly forced "to urinate and excrete on one another and crawl on the ground while they call out 'Long Live the State of Israel' or lick the earth; or on Holocaust day, to write numbers on their own hands 'in memory of Jews in the extermination camps'." (Chomsky 2002, pp. 8–9; Chomsky 1999, p. 561)) illustrated by the widespread practice among Border guards, police and soldiers at checkpoints of forcing randomly selected Palestinians to abase themselves by acting, as ordered, unhumanly, as animals: when the Palestinians comply, the compliance is taken as evidence that Palestinians are not human. (Note: "The pattern is common. Israeli journalist Tom Segev reports what happened when an Arab lawyer told him that a random walk through Jerusalem would yield ample evidence of intimidation and humiliation of Arabs. Skeptical, Segev walked with him through Jerusalem, where he was stopped repeatedly by Border Guards to check his identification papers. One ordered him: 'Come here, jump.' Laughing, he dropped the papers on the road and ordered the lawyer to pick them up. 'These people will do whatever you tell them to do,' the Border Guards explained to Segev: 'If I tell him to jump, he will jump. Run, he will run. Take your clothes off, he will take them off. If I tell him to kiss the wall, he will kiss it. If I tell him to crawl on the road, won't he crawl?....Everything. Tell him to curse his mother and he will curse her too.' They are 'not human beings.' The Guards then searched the lawyer, slapped him, and ordered him to remove his shoes, warning that they could order him to remove his clothes as well. 'My Arab,' Segev continues, 'kept silent and sat down on the ground' as the Border Guards laughed, saying again 'Really, not humans,' then walked away." (Chomsky 1999, p. 562))

According to Hanan Ashrawi, a Palestinian scholar and diplomat, while she was part of a peaceful protest outside Bir Zeit University, where she lectured and which had been shut down, an Israeli sniper who shot twice in an attempt to assassinate her, on missing yelled "You Arabs are all animals". Israeli orthodox rabbi and politician Eli Ben-Dahan, subsequently appointed Deputy Defense Minister in the new Netanyahu coalition government in 2015 whose portfolio included running the IDF's Civil Administration governing the West Bank, confided his view in a radio interview in 2013 that Palestinians "aren't human... To me, they are like animals." The same view was expressed by Rabbi David Batzri in protesting against a co-educational Jewish-Arab school in Jerusalem. Palestinians, he stated, are "beasts and asses", the "scum of snakes". (Note: "The establishment of a school like this one is a despicable and impure act. Stand in the way and prevent this. Darkness and light cannot be mixed. The people of Israel are pure and Arabs are a nation of asses. The question must be asked, why didn't God give them four legs, because they are asses." The son, Yitzhak Batzri, also made objectionable comments. "The Arabs are beasts and asses," he said. "They are inferior, they want to take our daughters. People say we are racist, but – they are the evil ones, the cruel ones, the scum of snakes. This is war." (Rosner 2006))

At the beginning of the Gaza war, then Defense Minister Yoav Gallant announced that Israel would blockade Gaza, stating: "Everything is closed... We are fighting human animals and we are acting accordingly." This statement has been cited in accusations that Israel is committing genocide in Gaza, including in South Africa's genocide case against Israel.

The Israeli-American historian of the Holocaust Omer Bartov, who did his PhD on the indoctrination of German soldiers and their subsequent actions on the Eastern front, has argued that young Israeli soldiers who have fought inside the Gaza Strip in the ongoing Gaza war display attitudes towards their enemies similar to those of German soldiers in the Second World War in that they have internalized the view that Hamas militants are "human animals" and Palestinians generally less than human. (Note: "Unlike the majority of Israelis, these young people had seen the destruction of Gaza with their own eyes. It seemed to me that they had not only internalised a particular view that has become commonplace in Israel – namely, that the destruction of Gaza as such was a legitimate response to 7 October – but had also developed a way of thinking that I had observed many years ago when studying the conduct, worldview and self-perception of German army soldiers in the second world war. Having internalised certain views of the enemy – the Bolsheviks as Untermenschen; Hamas as human animals – and of the wider population as less than human and undeserving of rights, soldiers observing or perpetrating atrocities tend to ascribe them not to their own military, or to themselves, but to the enemy." (Bartov 2024)) One IDF witness to the abuses of Palestinians imprisoned in Sde Teiman testified that guards were indoctrinated to think of the detainees as not being human beings. (Note: "They keep pumping it into your brain that you have to disconnect. That they're not people. That they're not human beings." (Fogelman 2024))

In a 2004 interview with the Israeli journalist Ari Shavit, the Israeli historian Benny Morris justified the 1948 Palestinian expulsion and flight: "I don't think that the expulsions of 1948 were war crimes. You can't make an omelet without breaking eggs. You have to dirty your hands", as well as stating: "Something like a cage has to be built for them [Palestinians]. I know that sounds terrible. It is really cruel. But there is no choice. There is a wild animal there that has to be locked up in one way or another."

== Palestinians as non-human mammal species ==
=== Pigs ===
A study of Israeli children's drawings of an Arab type found a number of pictures which depicted Arabs as pigs. Porcine caricatures of the Islamic prophet Muhammad done by a recent settler from Russia were found posted on the walls of Hebron during a period of disturbances in 1997. (Note: Eating meat from pigs was commonplace among early Jewish immigrants to Palestine and the practice was abhorred by the rabbinate. When Jewish butchers sold pork to their Jewish-German customers under the British mandate in WW2, they were harassed and the shops retailing such sausages were the object of frequent protests by religious Jews, who associated eating pork with Hitler, and Nazi Germany. One cry used by demonstrators was "Pig!" (Gilad 2024, pp. 98–100))

=== Beasts ===
Menachem Begin addressed the Knesset in 1982, justifying the Israeli invasion of Lebanon: "We will defend our children. If the hand of any two-footed animal is raised against them, that hand will be cut off, and our children will grow up in joy in the homes of their parents." This has been contested as not referring to Palestinians but to terrorists generally. A decade earlier, in response to the Munich massacre at the 1972 Summer Olympics, Begin had posed a rhetorical question before the Knesset. speaking of the Palestinian militant group responsible for the atrocity in the following terms: 'Is it because of seven hundred nobodies, two-legged ravenous beasts, that Jews will once again bow their heads?', swearing to eliminate the murderers. Benjamin Netanyahu has spoken both of Palestinians and Arabs beyond the borders as "predators" (hayot teref).

=== Vampires ===
In 2015, Bentzi Gopstein, director of the militant far-right anti-assimilationist movement Lehava, who is also known for calling for the burning of Christian churches in Israel, wrote on a website associated with the teachings of Abraham Isaac Kook, the first chief Ashkenazi rabbi of Mandatory Palestine, that Christians in Israel were bloodsucking "vampires" who should be thrown out of the country to stop the drinking once more of Jewish blood.

=== Rats ===
During the Gaza war, the Israeli rappers Subliminal, HaTzel and Raviv Kenner produced a popular song, "It's On Us", in support of Israel in which it is stated of Gazans that: "There is no forgiveness for swarms of rats. They will die in their rat holes."

In 1938, during discussions in the Irgun about tactics to be used against Arabs as reprisals, Yosef Katznelson, an associate of the revisionist Ze'ev Jabotinsky, successfully advocated the adoption of terrorism against Palestinians, arguing that: "We must create a situation whereby killing an Arab is like killing a rat, where Arabs are dirt, and thereby showing that we and not they are the power to be reckoned with in Palestine".

=== Dogs ===
Shmuel Agnon, a future Nobel prize winner, wrote in his 1945 novel Temol shilshom (Only Yesterday), that Arabs are people "without dignity, accepting humiliation, exploiting the settlers, cause of the destruction of the land, annoying, filthy, cheating the Jews, hating civilization, resembling dogs." Moshe Dayan suggested in 1967 that Israel should tell the Palestinian refugees in the conquered territories, "we have no solution, you shall continue to live like dogs, and whoever wishes may leave, and we will see where this process leads." Palestinians are often ordered by Israeli police to behave as though they were dogs. (Note: "'They treated us like dogs. They forced us to bark, threatening to beat us if we didn't. We did whatever they asked because if we didn't they would beat us badly,' one man said" (Stepansky et al. 2023).)

In just over a month after the outbreak of the Israel-Gaza war, an Israeli musical duo Ness and Stilla produced a song, Harbu Darbu, which quickly became a smash hit. Addressing themselves to Gazans as the sons of Amalek, they wrote promising another X on their rifle, "cause every dog will get what's coming to him".

=== Monkeys ===
According to Dov Yermiya, during the 1982 Lebanon War, Lebanese and Palestinian prisoners were forced to sit with their heads between their legs, beaten if they moved, while guards shouted at them "You are a nation of monkeys, you are terrorists, and we will break your heads: You want a state? Build it on the moon." Yermiya was dismissed from the IDF when he went public with his account of the war.

=== Moles ===
Avraham Stern, leader of the Zionist paramilitary Lehi, said that Arabs were "not a nation but a mole that grew in the wilderness of the eternal desert." (Note: "The Arabs are not a nation but a mole that grew in the wilderness of the eternal desert. They are nothing but murderers." (Peteet 2005, p. 167))

== Palestinians as reptilian species ==
=== Snakes ===
Rabbi Ovadia Yosef, "the most widely respected rabbinical figure among Oriental and Sephardic Jews throughout the world", known for his expressed hope that Palestinians might disappear from the face of the earth, called them "snakes". (Note: Criticizing Ehu Barak's 2000 peace negotiations, he stated: "Where are this man's brains? He runs a mad dash after them [the Palestinians] to catch them and then he continues to make peace. But what is peace? This is peace? There should be security for the people of Israel. Why are you bringing them close to us? You bring snakes next to us. How can you make peace with a snake?" (LAT 2000)) Ayelet Shaked, prior to her appointment as Minister of Justice in Benjamin Netanyahu's 2015 coalition government, gave prominence to an unpublished article on her Facebook page, written by the settler journalist Uri Elitzur. It likened Palestinian mothers to breeders of "little snakes" and appeared to call for their genocide. (Note: "What's so horrifying about understanding that the entire Palestinian people is the enemy? Every war is between two peoples, and in every war the people who started the war, that whole people, is the enemy…They are all enemy combatants, and their blood shall be on all their heads. Now this also includes the mothers of the martyrs, who send them to hell with flowers and kisses. They should follow their sons, nothing would be more just. They should go, as should the physical homes in which they raised the snakes. Otherwise, more little snakes will be raised there." (Bryan 2015)) The Israeli military metaphor of mowing the lawn, the periodic large-scale bombing runs over the Gaza Strip, has been justified as a practical measure designed to stop "snakes" slithering among unmown weeds. (Note: In 2021, David M. Weinberg of the Jerusalem Institute for Strategy and Security wrote in the Jerusalem Post that "If you fail to do so, weeds grow wild and snakes begin to slither around in the brush...Just like mowing your front lawn, this is constant, hard work." (Taylor 2021))

=== Crocodiles ===
In August 2000, Ehud Barak likened Palestinians to crocodiles in that, in his view, "The more you give them meat, the more they want."

== Palestinians as insects and other animals ==
=== Leeches ===
Yehoshua Palmon described the Palestinian middlemen who acted as front men for Jewish land-purchase operations as leeches.

=== Lice ===
Rehavam Ze'evi, at the time Minister for Tourism, once referred to the 180,000 Palestinians working in Israel as a cancer, "lice" Israel must rid itself of. (Note: "They arrived here and are trying to become citizens because they want social security and welfare payments. We should get rid of the ones who are not Israeli citizens the same way you get rid of lice. We have to stop this cancer from spreading within us." (The Washington Post 2 July 2001)) (Note: Ze'evi also called the Palestinian leader Yasser Arafat at various times a "viper, a scorpion, a vampire, and a Hitler" (Spector 2009, p. 216).)

=== Mosquitoes and wasps ===
In keeping with his comparison of Israel to a villa crowded round by a jungle, Ehud Barak in an interview with The New York Times, stated that both the Labor and Likud parties wished to "kill the mosquito" that swamped Israel, differing only in while his party wished to "drain the swamp", Likud wished to keep it. (Note: "We're both trying to kill the mosquito...But at the same time we're trying to drain the swamp, while Likud is saying the swamp is ours and we'll never give it up. We believe the only way to overcome terrorism is to solve the source of the problem." (Peteet 2005, p. 168))

The Associated Press reported that the usage of Palestinians by the Israeli military as human shields in the Gaza war was internally described as the "mosquito protocol", with the Palestinians being labelled as "wasps".

=== Roaches ===
When several Palestinian youths had each been fined $650 for throwing stones at an Israeli police chief's car, Lieutenant-General Raphael Eitan, then-chief of staff of the IDF, stated in the Knesset that for every case of stone-throwing, ten settlements should be built in retaliation, adding: "When we have settled the land, all the Arabs will be able to do about it will be to scurry around like drugged roaches in a bottle." The Palestinian philosopher Sari Nusseibeh was once called to account for engaging in a "ploy" for having added his signature to a circular condemning the stabbing of a Jew. The then-Israeli military chief asked if "a cockroach (can) write a statement at all?", at which his resident Arab intelligence expert quipped: "Only on strict telephone orders from Arafat, the terrorist magician". In late 2023, a cartoon mounted on his Twitter account in October 2023 by Arsen Ostrovsky depicting Hamas militants as cockroaches, with Palestinian colours, being crushed under an IDF boot, was placed under restriction by Twitter for its use of insect imagery, considered an example of "textbook Nazi propaganda". A Telegram channel operated by an IDF psychological warfare unit designed to influence Israeli opinion ran videos of captured Palestinians and the corpses of Hamas militants with the caption: "Exterminating the roaches... exterminating the Hamas rats...Share this beauty." (Note: "Photos of Palestinian men captured by the IDF in the Strip and the bodies of terrorists were captioned: 'Exterminating the roaches... exterminating the Hamas rats...Share this beauty.' A video of a soldier allegedly dipping machine gun bullets in pork fat is captioned: 'What a man!!!!! Greases bullets with lard. You won't get your virgins.' Another caption was: 'Garbage juice!!!! Another dead terrorist!! You have to watch it with the sound, you'll die laughing'." (Kubovich 2024))

=== Ants ===
Aryeh King, the deputy mayor of Jerusalem, commenting on a photo depicting hundreds of stripped Palestinians detained by the IDF in Beit Lahia, suggested that D9 bulldozer should bury them alive, since they were "Muslim Nazis" and "ants."

=== Spiders ===
In 2018, Ehud Rosen writing for the Jerusalem Center for Public Affairs, described the global BDS network supporting disinvestment in Israel as a spider web.

=== Grasshoppers/locusts (hagavim) ===
In 1988, the then Prime Minister of Israel, Yitzhak Shamir commenting on Palestinians rising up during the First Intifada, dismissed them saying "Those who want to destroy what we build are as grasshoppers (hagavim) in our own sight. If someone wants to damage this force he will crush his head on these rocks", (Note: Of the five instances of the use of this term in the Tanakh, one is ambiguous and has been thought to refer to the locust (arbeh), leading some to suggest Shamir was referring to the Palestinians as the latter (Krauthammer 1988)) in a clear allusion to Numbers 13:33. The implication of the allusion would be that whereas in Biblical times, the Israelites felt like grasshoppers when the Anakim giants threatened them, in modern Israel, it is Israelis themselves who now have become giants, while the Palestinians are the trembling Israelites of yore. The statement (Note: "Anybody who wants to damage this fortress and other fortresses we are establishing will have his head smashed against the boulders and walls...In remarks aimed at Arab rioters, the Prime Minister said:'We say to them from the heights of this mountain and from the perspective of thousands of years of history that they are like grasshoppers compared to us.'." (Kampeas 2011)) was both criticized for likening Palestinians to insects (Note: The MK Oren Hazan used a similar analogy when intercepting a bus carrying a Palestinian mother visiting her imprisoned son: MK Oren Hazan confronted families of terrorists from the Gaza Strip who came to visit their imprisoned sons in the south, shouting abuse at them as they rode a bus taking them to the prison. The families on the bus were on their way to Nafha prison, near Sde Boker, from the Gaza Strip in a convoy escorted by the Red Cross. Hazan boarded the bus at the Gaza border with video crews in tow. He said on Twitter he told the relatives that the prisoners were "terrorists who belong in the ground". In a video clip on social media, he shouted at one prisoner's mother that her son was an "insect" and a "dog." (Bender 2017).) and defended by some as having been misconstrued. (Note: "Does anyone feel any qualm that here are men seeking high office who have nothing to say about the forcible internment without trial of almost 5,000 people; who have felt themselves unable to criticize the Israeli Prime Minister, Yitzhak Shamir, for calling Palestinians 'grasshoppers'? Why doesn't the press, eager to remind the world for the millionth time about Jackson's 'Hymietown', challenge the two white candidates to speak out on this or any of the innumerable racist statements from Israeli leaders about Palestinians?" (Cockburn 1988, p. 496))

=== Worms ===
Likud member Yehiel Hazan stated in the Knesset in 2004 that Arabs are worms. (Note: "The Arabs are worms. You find them everywhere like worms, underground as well as above." Hazan continued: "Until we understand that we're doing business with a nation of assassins and terrorists who don't want us here, there will be no let up. These worms have not stopped attacking Jews for a century." (AJ 2004)) The author of a study of Palestinian children's deaths from Israeli gunfire pondered whether Hazan's attitude could explain an apparent exemption from the application of international law, when a court rendered a not-guilty verdict concerning a captain who had "verified" the killing of a young girl, Iman Darweesh Al Hams by shooting into her wounded body 17 bullets.

=== Salmon ===
Ehud Barak, according to Benny Morris, thinks that it would take 80 years after 1948 for the Palestinians to be ready to make a compromise with Israel. Palestinians in those decades, he thinks, suffered from a "salmon syndrome" in their desire to return to the lands of their birth. Once those generations die out, few such Palestinian "salmons" will remain who desire to return to Palestine. (Note: "He seems to think in terms of generations and hesitantly predicts that only 'eighty years' after 1948 will the Palestinians be historically ready for a compromise. By then, most of the generation that experienced the catastrophe of 1948 at first hand will have died; there will be 'very few salmons around who still want to return to their birthplaces to die.' (Barak speaks of a 'salmon syndrome' among the Palestinians—and says that Israel, to a degree, was willing to accommodate it, through the family reunion scheme, allowing elderly refugees to return to be with their families before they die.)" (Morris & Barak 2002))

=== Termites ===
In 2023 Pini Badash, an Israeli politician elected to the Knesset on the Tzomet ticket and mayor of Omer, near Beersheba, likened the Bedouin to termites. Regarding planning for a new housing development he said he would block any attempt by Bedouins to purchase a home there, since their presence would eat away at the foundation of the new community:

Imagine you built a house, a terrific house, you installed cameras, a fence, no one can get in. But what happened? The termites in the house have eaten you. That is our situation. There's a strong army, there's intelligence, and in the end we're eaten from within.

== Microbial, mineral, extraterrestrial, and other biological forms ==
- In 1979, in Kiryat Arba, where the terrorist Meir Kahane was reputedly located, a woman settler explained to the journalist Ellen Canterow that there was a chain of being, with Jews on top followed by lesser specimens, and among them, Arabs could be found on the lower rungs. (Note: "One woman said she believed in a 'chain of being': on top, Jews. Then, lesser human specimens. Then animals, vegetables, minerals. Somewhere in the lower reaches of lesser humanity were Arabs." (Canterow 2009))
- The phenomenon of terrorism arises, for Ze'ev Boim, at the time the Deputy Minister for Defense, from a "genetic blemish" in the Palestinian people.
- According to Geoffrey Aronson, an anonymous but high-ranking officer in the IDF described the inhabitants of the Gaza Strip as "local bacteria" (Note: The then Iranian President Mahmoud Ahmadinejad in 2008 likewise called Israel "filthy bacteria". Such language, used against Jews, evokes the Nazi slogans that verbally accompanied the Holocaust.) Negotiations themselves with Palestinians would only, according to religious Zionist rabbi and settler Moshe Levinger, spread the "virus of peace".
- In May 2001, the day after the bodies of two Israeli settler children from Tekoa were found in a cave, where they had been murdered, the former President of Israel Moshe Katsav told a group of mitzvah boys that Palestinians "don't belong to our continent, to our world, but actually belong to a different galaxy."
- Israeli political, military and religious leaders have variously described Palestinians as a "cancer" and vermin to be exterminated. (Note: "Tutsis were debased as 'cockroaches', a word also invoked by a then chief of the Israeli defence forces to describe Palestinians. Other Israeli political, military and religious leaders have at different times described Palestinians as 'a cancer', 'vermin', and called for them to be 'annihilated'. They are frequently portrayed as backward and a burden on the country." (McGreal 2023)) Moshe Ya’alon the Israeli Chief of Staff and Defense Minister at the time, with regard to the tactics used against the West Bank town of Jenin stated that the threat from Palestinians was a "cancerous manifestation", which could be treated by amputation or, as he preferred, by "chemotherapy". The idea had previously expressed by Meir Kahane who, in his 1980 book They Must Go wrote of Palestinians as a "cancer" in the body of the "Jewish State" that must be excised by any means.
- Rabbi Yaacov Perrin claimed that even one million Palestinian Arabs are "not worth a Jewish fingernail".

== Contemporary reciprocal dehumanization ==
Blatant dehumanization in the asymmetric Israeli-Palestinian conflict is mutual, with people on both sides likening the other's brutality to animal behavior. One study conducted during the 2014 Gaza War found that such dehumanization is not exclusive to the Israelis but that Palestinians also dehumanize Israelis to a similar degree, the research showing comparable results between Israelis and the disempowered Palestinians. (Note: On average, Israelis showed the "highest levels of blatant dehumanization towards any outgroup observed to date using the 'Ascent of man' measure of blatant dehumanization", ranking Palestinians 39.81% lower than their own group and significantly closer to man's quadruped ancestors than to modern man, while for Palestinians, Israelis figured at 37.03% on the same scale. the Israelis sampled on average expressed the view that to save one wounded Israeli soldier, they would willingly kill 575 Palestinian civilians. (Israelis) 'exhibited relatively low willingness to negotiate, low support for concession making, high support for collective aggression, and strikingly high acceptance of civilian casualties... Among Palestinians, there was moderate support for negotiations, and a similarly moderate level of willingness to sacrifice one Palestinian life to save four Israeli children.' (Bruneau & Kteily 2017, pp. 1–2, 7–9, 11).) (Note: In sum, despite their disadvantaged status, Palestinians reported strikingly high levels of blatant dehumanization of their more powerful Israeli neighbors. Indeed, we observed that the participants in our Palestinian and Israeli samples dramatically dehumanized the outgroup, rating them as closer to animals than full humans. Not only was the degree of outgroup dehumanization quite high among the advantaged and disadvantaged group, but it was also quite potent: as with Israelis, Palestinians' dehumanization of the outgroup was reliably and uniquely associated with aggressive attitudes and support for aggressive policies likely to feed cycles of intergroup violence.(Bruneau & Kteily 2017, p. 14).) Protesting that they are "human beings" while cursing Israeli soldiers and settlers as "animals" is, according to Penny Johnson, the commonest refrain heard from Palestinians held up at Israeli checkpoints. (Note: "Exploring attitudes and anecdotes from Palestinians living under military occupation sharply raises the question of how animal welfare and protection can be advanced when humans are suffering. 'We are human beings' is perhaps the most common refrain from Palestinians facing humiliating treatment at the hands of a bored soldier at a checkpoint. And 'animals' is the most frequent curse an angry Palestinian will hurl against the harsh behavior of Israeli soldiers and settlers." (Johnson 2019, p. xvii)) The use of dehumanizing language describing Palestinians as animals increased following the October 7 attacks. (Note: Attacking the perceived bias in Western media which in his view highlights Israelis as victims while assuming Palestinian lives do not matter, the PA representative at the United Nations, Riyad Mansour, stated that there is a trend whereby "History...begins for some media and politicians when Israelis are killed. Our people have endured one deadly year after another...We [Palestinians] are not sub-humans. Let me repeat: We are not sub-humans. We will never accept a rhetoric that denigrates our humanity and reneges our rights. A rhetoric that ignores the occupation of our land and oppression of our people." (Mitrovica 2023))

== See also ==
- Dehumanization of Jews and Israelis in Palestinian discourse
- Racism in Israel

== Sources ==
- Aaron, Paul Gaston (Winter 2019). "The Idolatry of Force (Part II)". Journal of Palestine Studies. 48 (2): 58–78. doi:10.1525/jps.2019.48.2.58. JSTOR 26873196.
- Affitto, Frank M. (2007). "Of Guns, Children, and the Maelstrom: Determining Purposive Action in Israeli-Perpetrated Firearm Deaths of Palestinian Children and Minors". In Springwood, Charles Fruehling (ed.). Open Fire: Understanding Global Gun Cultures. Berg Publishers. pp. 42–55. ISBN 978-1-845-20417-4.
- Arlosoroff, Meirav (7 January 2023). "Israeli Law Meant to Keep Arabs Out of Certain Communities Is Now Used Against Jews". Haaretz.
- Aronson, Geoffrey (1987). Creating facts: Israel, Palestinians, and the West Bank. Institute for Palestine Studies. ISBN 978-0-88728-160-0.
- Bar-Tal, Daniel; Teichman, Yona (2005). Stereotypes and prejudices in conflict: representations of Arabs in Israeli Jewish society. Cambridge University Press. ISBN 978-0-521-80797-5.
- Bartov, Omer (13 August 2024). "As a former IDF soldier and historian of genocide, I was deeply disturbed by my recent visit to Israel". The Guardian.
- Beaumont, Peter (10 May 2016). "Netanyahu plans fence around Israel to protect it from 'wild beasts'". The Guardian.
- Beinart, Peter (26 September 2013). "The American Jewish Cocoon". The New York Review of Books.
- Ben Zikri, Almog; Kubovic, Yaniv (16 May 2018). "Israeli Defense Chief: Hamas Leaders 'Bunch of Cannibals Who Use Children as Ammunition'". Haaretz.
- Bender, Arik (25 December 2017). "MK Oren Hazan confronts families of terrorists: 'Your son is a dog'". The Jerusalem Post.
- Bishara, Amahl A. (2013). Back Stories: U.S. News Production and Palestinian Politics. Stanford University Press. ISBN 978-0-804-78427-6.
- Bowen, Jeremy (16 October 2024). "Bowen: US threat to cut Israel military aid is sign of anger at broken promises". BBC News.
- Bregman, Ahron (2002) [First published 2000]. Israel's wars: a history since 1947 (2nd ed.). Routledge. ISBN 978-0-415-28716-6.
- Brownfeld, Allan C. (March 1999). "Growing Intolerance Threatens the Humane Jewish Tradition". Washington Report on Middle East Affairs. pp. 84–89.
- Bruneau, Emile; Kteily, Nour (26 July 2017). "The enemy as animal: Symmetric dehumanization during asymmetric warfare". PLOS One. 12 (7). Bibcode:2017PLoSO..1281422B. doi:10.1371/journal.pone.0181422. PMC 5528981. PMID 28746412.
- Bryan, Rob (3 October 2015). "The refreshing bluntness of Ayelet Shaked". Mondoweiss.
- Burston, Bradley (7 March 2017). "Five ways Israel Will Make you Hate Israel this Week". Haaretz.
- Canterow, Ellen (10 November 2009). "Heroism in a Vanishing Landscape". CounterPunch.
- Chomsky, Noam (1999) [First published 1983]. Fateful triangle: the United States, Israel, and the Palestinians. Pluto Press. ISBN 978-0-745-31530-0.
- Chomsky, Noam (2002). Pirates and Emperors, Old and New: International Terrorism in the Real World. Pluto Press. ISBN 978-0-745-31981-0.
- Chomsky, Noam (11 September 2014). "In a barrel in Gaza: What Will Israel Do Next?". Stop the War Coalition.
- Chomsky, Noam; Pappé, Ilan (2015). On Palestine. Penguin Books. ISBN 978-0-241-97352-3.
- Cigar, Norman (2003). "The Nationalist Serrbian Intellectuals and Islam: Defining and Eliminating a Muslim Community". In Qureshi, Emran; Sells, Michael Anthony (eds.). The new crusades: constructing the Muslim enemy. Columbia University Press. pp. 314–350. ISBN 978-0-231-12667-0.
- Cockburn, Alexander (1988). Corruptions of Empire. Verso Books. ISBN 978-0-860-91940-7.
- Cohen, Dan (25 June 2015). "Interview with a suicide bomber". Mondoweiss.
- Cohen, Dudi (20 February 2008a). "Ahmadinejad: Zionist regime - a dirty microbe". Ynetnews. Ynet.
- Cohen, Hillel (2008b). Army of Shadows: Palestinian Collaboration with Zionism, 1917-1948. University of California Press. ISBN 978-0-520-25989-8.
- Cohen-Almagor, Raphael (Winter 2012). "Is Law Appropriate to Regulate Hateful and Racist Speech? The Israeli Experience". Israel Studies Review. 27 (2): 41–64. doi:10.3167/isr.2012.270204. JSTOR 41804802.
- Cordesman, Anthony H.; Moravitz, Jennifer (2005). The Israeli-Palestinian War: Escalating to Nowhere. Greenwood Publishing Group. ISBN 978-0-275-98758-9.
- CQ (2010). Issues in Race, Ethnicity, Gender, and Class: Selections From CQ Researcher. Sage Publications. ISBN 978-1-412-97967-2.
- Danon, Danny (13 September 2023). "An open letter to Thomas Friedman". Jewish News Syndicate.
- Dasgupta, Punyapriya (29 July 2006). "Israel's Foes as Beasts and Insects". CounterPunch.
- Diaz, Jaclyn; Batrawy, Aya (9 October 2023). "Israel unleashes attacks on Gaza as Hamas threatens hostages' lives". NPR.
- Finkelstein, Norman (2021) [First published 2018]. Gaza: An Inquest Into Its Martyrdom. University of California Press. ISBN 978-0-520-31833-5.
- Fisk, Robert (2006). The Great War for Civilisation: The Conquest of the Middle East. HarperCollins. ISBN 978-1-841-15008-6.
- Fogelman, Shay (16 August 2024). "We Served on Israel's Sde Teiman Base. Here's What We Did to Gazans Detained There". Haaretz.
- Friedman, Thomas (2 February 2024). "Understanding the Middle East Through the Animal Kingdom". The New York Times.
- Friedman, Thomas L. (1995) [First published 1989]. From Beirut to Jerusalem. Anchor Doubleday. ISBN 0-385-41372-6.
- Gerteiny, Alfred G. (2007). The terrorist conjunction: the United States, the Israeli-Palestinian conflict, and al-Qā'ida. Praeger Security International. ISBN 978-0-275-99644-4.
- Gilad, Efrat (2024). "Camel Controversies and Pork Politics in British Mandate Palestine". Global Food History. 10 (1): 87–108. doi:10.1080/20549547.2022.2106074.
- Goldberg, Jeffrey (24 May 2004). "Among the Settlers". The New Yorker.
- Goldenberg, Tia (18 January 2024). "Harsh Israeli rhetoric against Palestinians becomes central to South Africa's genocide case". Associated Press.
- Gordon, Neve (16 October 2023). "The myth of Israel's 'most moral army'". Al Jazeera.
- Hamdi, Tahrir (2022). Imagining Palestine: Cultures of Exile and National Identity. Bloomsbury Publishing. ISBN 978-0-755-61783-8.
- Kasim, Samar (27 October 2023). "Israel's former ambassador to UN calls Palestinians 'inhuman animals'". Al Jazeera.
- Hass, Amira (2014) [First published 1999]. Drinking the Sea at Gaza: Days and Nights in a Land Under Siege. Henry Holt and Company. ISBN 978-0-805-05739-3.
- "Head of extremist Jewish group calls Christians 'blood-sucking vampires'". The Times of Israel. 22 December 2015.
- Hoffman, Bruce (2015). Anonymous Soldiers: The Struggle for Israel, 1937-1947. Knopf Doubleday. ISBN 978-1-101-87466-0.
- Horowitz, Elliott S. (2006). Reckless rites: Purim and the legacy of Jewish violence. Princeton University Press. ISBN 978-0-691-12491-9.
- "Israel Faces Accusation of Genocide as South Africa Brings Case to U.N. Court". The New York Times. 11 January 2024.
- "Israel-Palestine war: Israeli politician calls for captured Palestinians to be 'buried alive'". Middle East Eye. 8 December 2023.
- "Israeli MP: Arabs are worms". Al Jazeera. 13 December 2004.
- "Israeli Official Calls Illegal Palestinians 'Lice'". The Washington Post. Associated Press. 2 July 2001.
- Jawad, Saleh Abdel (2007). "Zionist Massacres: the Creation of the Palestinian Refugee Problem in the 1948 War". In Benvenisti, Eyal; Gans, Chaim; Hanafī, Sārī (eds.). Israel and the Palestinian refugees. Max-Plank-Institut für ausländisches öffentliches recht und Völkerrecht. Vol. 189. Springer. pp. 59–127. ISBN 978-3-540-68161-8.
- Joffe, Lawrence (25 November 2004). "Lieut-Gen Rafael Eitan". The Guardian.
- Johnson, Penny (2019). Companions in Conflict: Animals in Occupied Palestine. Melville House. ISBN 978-1-612-19743-2.
- Kampeas, Ron (6 May 2011). "Andrew Sullivan owes Yitzhak Shamir an apology". Jewish Telegraphic Agency.
- Kapeliouk, Amnon (25 June 1982). "Begin and the 'beasts'". The New Statesman. p. 12.
- Kessler, Oren (2023). Palestine 1936: The Great Revolt and the Roots of the Middle East Conflict. Rowman & Littlefield. ISBN 978-1-538-14880-8.
- Khazaal, Natalie (29 February 2024). "Bias hiding in plain sight: Decades of analyses suggest US media skews anti-Palestinian". The Conversation.
- Kimmerling, Baruch (2003). Politicide: Ariel Sharon's War Against the Palestinians. Verso Books. ISBN 1-85984-517-7.
- Kraft, Scott (28 February 1994). "Extremists Pay Tribute to Killer of 48 at Funeral". Los Angeles Times.
- Krämer, Gudrun (2006). "Anti-Semitism in the Muslim World. A Critical Review". Die Welt des Islams. 46 (3): 243–276. doi:10.1163/157006006778942035. JSTOR 20140738.
- Krauthammer, Charles (20 April 1988). "'Grasshoppers' (cont'd)". The Washington Post.
- Kubovich, Yaniv (4 February 2024). "Israeli Army Admits Running Unauthorized Graphic Gaza Influence Op". Haaretz.
- Landler, Mark (15 November 2023). "'Erase Gaza': War Unleashes Incendiary Rhetoric in Israel". The New York Times.
- Loewenstein, Antony (2009). My Israel Question: Reframing The Israel/Palestine Conflict. Melbourne University Press. ISBN 978-0-522-85268-4.
- Makdisi, Ussama (2010). Faith Misplaced: The Broken Promise of U.S.-Arab Relations: 1820-2001. PublicAffairs. ISBN 978-1-586-48856-7.
- Masalha, Nur (1992). Expulsion of the Palestinians: The Concept of "transfer" in Zionist Political Thought, 1882-1948. Institute for Palestine Studies. ISBN 978-0-887-28235-5.
- Masalha, Nur (2000). Imperial Israel and the Palestinians: : The Politics of Expansion. Pluto Press. ISBN 978-0-745-31615-4.
- Maxwell-Hyslop, Robin (18 October 1973). "Middle East". Hansard. pp. 419–546.
- McGreal, Chris (16 October 2023). "The language being used to describe Palestinians is genocidal". The Guardian.
- Mearsheimer, John (29 April 2010). "The Future of Palestine: Righteous Jews vs. the New Afrikaners". Washington, D.C.: The Palestine Center.
- Mearsheimer, John; Walt, Stephen (2008). The Israel Lobby and U.S. Foreign Policy. Penguin Books. ISBN 978-0-141-03123-1.
- Mednick, Sam; Magdy, Samy (24 May 2025). "Israeli use of human shields in Gaza was systematic, soldiers and former detainees tell the AP". Associated Press.
- Mitrovica, Andrew (10 October 2023). "Get this straight, Western media: Palestinians aren't sub-human". Al Jazeera.
- Morris, Benny; Barak, Ehud (13 June 2002). "Camp David and After: An Exchange". The New York Review.
- Morris, Benny; Shavit, Ari (16–18 January 2004). "An interview with Benny Morris". CounterPunch.
- Moughrabi, Fouad (Fall 1992). "Israeli Control and Palestinian Resistance". Social Justice. 19 (3): 46–62. JSTOR 29766693.
- "Netanyahu calls Arabs 'wild beasts' while announcing Israel wall plan". Middle East Eye. 10 May 2016.
- Normand, Linn (2016). Demonization in International Politics: A Barrier to Peace in the Israeli-Palestinian Conflict. Palgrave Macmillan. ISBN 978-1-137-54581-7.
- Nusseibeh, Sari (2009) [First published 2007]. Once Upon a Country. Halban. ISBN 978-1-905-55914-5.
- Oren, Neta (2019). Israel's National Identity: The Changing Ethos of Conflict. Lynne Rienner Publishers. doi:10.1515/9781626377967-006. ISBN 978-1-626-37784-4.
- "'Palestinians as cockroaches' Cartoon Should Prompt Boycott of Antisemitism Conference". Canadians for Justice and Peace in the Middle East (CJPME). 16 October 2023.
- Peteet, Julie (2005). "Words as Interventions: Naming in the Palestine: Israel Conflict". Third World Quarterly. 26 (1): 153–172. doi:10.1080/0143659042000322964. JSTOR 3993769.
- Philo, Greg; Berry, Mike (2004). Bad News from Israel. Pluto Press. ISBN 978-0-745-32062-5.
- Pierotti, Ermete (1864). Customs and Traditions of Palestine Illustrating the Manners of the Ancient Hebrews. Deighton, Bell & Co.
- Pileggi, Tamar (11 May 2015). "New deputy defense minister called Palestinians 'animals'". The Times of Israel.
- Pugliese, Joseph (2020). Biopolitics of the More-Than-Human Forensic Ecologies of Violence. Duke University Press. ISBN 978-1-478-00907-8.
- "Rabbi's Remarks Outrage Jews and Arabs". Los Angeles Times. 7 August 2000.
- Rapoport, Meron (17 April 2008). "The Israeli 'settler' serving in Italy's parliament". Haaretz.
- Reynolds, Rory; Johnston, Holly (24 October 2023). "'Spider's web of tunnels': Freed Israeli hostage describes Hamas captivity". The National.
- Rosen, Ehud (9 July 2018). "The Spider Web: The Roots of BDS and the Campaign to Delegitimize Israel". Jerusalem Center for Public Affairs.
- Rosner, Tal (21 March 2006). "Rabbi Batzri to be probed for incitement". Ynetnews.
- Salaime, Samah (21 February 2016). "What about us 'beasts' living inside the Villa in the Jungle?". +972 Magazine.
- Schwarz, Jon (7 February 2024). "Thomas Friedman and the Red Lines in Journalism on Israel and Palestine". The Intercept.
- Segal, Raz; Green, Penny (14 January 2024). "Intent in the genocide case against Israel is not hard to prove". Al Jazeera.
- Seib, Philip (2016). Al Jazeera English: Global News in a Changing World. Palgrave Macmillan. ISBN 978-1-137-01574-7.
- Shalhub-Kifurkiyan, Nadirah (2009). Militarization and Violence Against Women in Conflict Zones in the Middle East: A Palestinian Case-Study. Cambridge University Press. ISBN 978-0-521-70879-1.
- Sharon, Gilad (18 November 2012). "A decisive conclusion is necessary". The Jerusalem Post.
- "Shas spiritual leader: Abbas and Palestinians should perish from this world". Haaretz. 29 August 2010.
- Shatz, Adam (30 August 2018). "The sea is the same sea". London Review of Books. Vol. 40, no. 16. pp. 24–28.
- Shilon, Avi (2012). Menachem Begin. Yale University Press. ISBN 978-0-300-18903-2.
- Spector, Stephen (2009). Evangelicals and Israel: The Story of American Christian Zionism. Oxford University Press. ISBN 978-0-195-36802-4.
- Stack, Megan K. (16 May 2024). "The View Within Israel Turns Bleak". The New York Times.
- Stepansky, Joseph; Najjar, Farah; Alsaafin, Linah; Mccready, Alastair (26 December 2023). "Israel-Hamas war updates: Death toll nears 21,000 in Gaza". Al Jazeera.
- Sufian, Sandy (Winter 2008). "Anatomy of the 1936–39 Revolt: Images of the Body in Political Cartoons of Mandatory Palestine". Journal of Palestine Studies. 37 (2): 23–42. doi:10.1525/jps.2008.37.2.23. JSTOR 10.1525/jps.2008.37.2.23.
- Taylor, Adam (14 May 2021). "With strikes targeting rockets and tunnels, the Israeli tactic of 'mowing the grass' returns to Gaza". The Washington Post.
- Tharoor, Ishaan (7 May 2015). "Israel's new justice minister considers all Palestinians to be 'the enemy'". The Washington Post.
- Trumpbour, John (2003). "The Clash of Civilizations: Samuel Huntington, Bernard Lewis,. And the Remaking of the Post-Cold War World Order". In Qureshi, Emran; Sells, Michael Anthony (eds.). The new crusades: constructing the Muslim enemy. Columbia University Press. pp. 88–129. doi:10.7312/qure12666-004. ISBN 978-0-231-12667-0.
- Viorst, Milton (1987). Sands of Sorrow: Israel's Journey from Independence. Harper & Row. ISBN 978-0-060-15707-4.
- Wieseltier, Leon (19 April 1988). "'Grasshoppers' (cont'd)". The Washington Post.
- Windecker, Gidon (2023). Between Jabal ʿAmil, Karbala and Jerusalem: The Lebanese Shi'a and the Struggle for Palestine. Springer. ISBN 978-3-031-38450-9.
- Winer, Stuart (16 May 2018). "Defense minister: Hamas are 'cannibals,' use women and children as weapons". The Times of Israel.
- Yip, Ka Lok (2022). The Use of Force Against Individuals in War Under International Law: A Social Ontological Approach. Oxford University Press. ISBN 978-0-192-64523-4.
- Younes, Ali (24 December 2015). "Jewish leader demands expulsion of 'Christian vampires'". Al Jazeera.
- Zalloua, Zahi (2017). Continental Philosophy and the Palestinian Question: Beyond the Jew and the Greek. Bloomsbury Publishing. ISBN 978-1-474-29919-0.
- Zonszein, Mairav (16 December 2017). "In Gaza, Israel is shooting fish in a barrel". +972 Magazine.
