= Al-Ayyam (Palestine) =

Palestinian newspaper

Al Ayyam الأيـــام

- Type: Daily newspaper
- Format: Print, online
- Owner: Akram Haniyya
- Editor-in-chief: Akram Haniyya
- Founded: 1995; 30 years ago
- Political alignment: Pro-government
- Language: Arabic
- Headquarters: Ramallah
- Website: http://www.al-ayyam.ps

Al Ayyam (in Arabic الأيام; The Days) is a newspaper, based in Ramallah, Palestine.

== History and profile ==
Al Ayyam was established in 1995, and it is the second-largest circulation daily newspaper in Palestine. Although it is an independent publication, it is considered to be a pro-government and pro-Fatah paper, and is funded by the Palestinian Authority.

In February 2008, a Hamas-controlled court banned the distribution of Al Ayyam in the Gaza Strip after the newspaper published a cartoon that ridiculed Hamas legislators and Hamas Prime Minister Ismail Haniyeh. The editor of the paper Akram Haniyeh and the offending cartoonist were sentenced to prison terms in absentia. The Palestinian Journalists' Syndicate condemned the court action. As part of a unity deal between Hamas and the Palestine Liberation Organization in May 2014, Al Ayyam returned to distribution in Gaza.

According to former employees, the paper sold a few thousand copies each day in the West Bank.

As of 2010 its editor-in-chief was Akram Haniyya. Rima Nazzal is among the contributors of the paper.

== Notable writers ==
- Asma al-Ghul (born 1982), Palestinian feminist journalist
