= Shock Israel's Security =

"Shock Israel's Security" "זעזע את ביטחונה של ישראל" "زلزل أمن إسرائيل" "Amna Israel"

Song by Al Wa3d Band for Islamic Art

from the album Atiaf 4
- Released: 25 March 2012
- Genre: Propaganda music
- Length: 5:04
- Label: 2012 E.T.W. Music Company
- Composer: Unknown
- Lyricist: Unknown

"Shock Israel's Security" (Hebrew: זעזע את ביטחונה של ישראל; Arabic: زلزل أمن إسرائيل), commonly known as "Attack, Do Terror Attacks", is a propaganda song produced by Al Wa3d Band for Islamic Art, Hamas' affiliated Lebanese Islamic Art Band, as part of their 4th Album, Atiaf 4 in 2012. It became a humorous hit in Israel and many parodic cover versions were produced in response.

The song was originally written in Arabic and published in 2012. Due to its success in the Arab world, the song was translated into Hebrew in 2014, as a part of a propaganda campaign by Hamas during the 2014 Israel-Gaza conflict. This version, just like the Arab version encourages attacks against Israel. The song became a humorous hit in Israel.

The song was removed from YouTube as a violation of its policies prohibiting hate speech and glorification of terrorism. Although an Indonesian channel re-uploaded it along with other accounts on YouTube that had not been terminated through the title in Arabic.

It was also removed from Spotify and Apple Music along with the album.
