= Rima Nazzal =

Palestinian politician and journalist

Personal details
- Born: Rima Kattaneh
- Spouse: Khaled Nazzal
- Education: Damascus University

Rima Nazzal (née: Kattaneh; Arabic: ريما نزال) is a Palestinian politician and author. She is a member of the Palestinian National Council and the General Union of Palestinian Women. She publishes articles in various publications.

== Biography ==
Rima's father was from Lifta, a village on the western outskirts of Jerusalem. She and her family had to leave their hometown in Palestine in 1969 when it was occupied by Israel. Rima managed to return to Palestine in the 1990s. She is a graduate of Damascus University where she received a degree in accounting. She was employed at the Governorate of Nablus and held different posts, including director of the Department of Women, the advisor of cultural affairs and women's issues, and the general manager of financial and administrative management. Nazzal is part of the secretariat of the General Union of Palestinian Women and deals with its legal activities. She is also a member of the Palestinian National Council. During the 2022–2023 period she was a Supporting Arab Women at the Table (SAWT) Project fellow at the Arab Reform Initiative in Paris.

Nazzal is one of the editorial board members of the Al Tasamoh magazine published by the Ramallah Center for Human Rights. She contributes to the Al-Ayyam newspaper based in Ramallah and published weekly editorials in the paper. Nazzal also work for the Middle East Monitor website.

Nazzal was married to Khaled Nazzal until his assassination by the Israeli agents in Athens, Greece, on 9 June 1986.
