= Alex Bein =

German-Jewish historian and Zionist historiographer

- אלכסנדר ביין
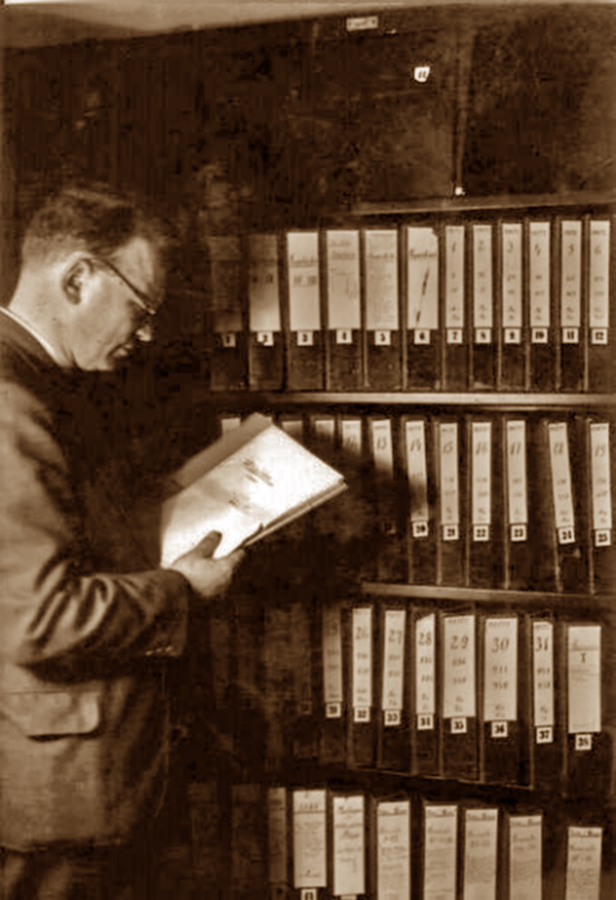
- Alex Bein
- Born: 21 January 1903; Steinach an der Saale, Bavaria, Germany
- Died: 20 June 1988 (aged 85); Stockholm, Sweden
- Occupations: Historian, archivist
- Notable work: Biography of Theodor Herzl
- Awards: Israel Prize (1987)

Alex Bein (Hebrew: אלכסנדר ביין; 21 January 1903 – 20 June 1988) was a German-Jewish historian and Zionist historiographer best known for his biography of Theodor Herzl.

== Biography ==
Bein was born in Steinach an der Saale in Bavaria, southern Germany. He immigrated to Palestine in 1933. He was a resident of Jerusalem. He was director of the Central Zionist Archives and the first State Archivist of Israel. Bein died while on a visit to Stockholm.

== Awards and recognition ==
Bein was awarded the Israel Prize in 1987 for his contribution to Zionist historiography.

== Published works ==
- Alex Bein (1980) Die Judenfrage : Biogr. e. Weltproblems (2 volumes) Stuttgart : Deutsche Verlags-Anstalt
  - Alex Bein, Harry Zohn (translator) (1990) "The Jewish Question: Biography of a World Problem", ISBN 0-8386-3252-1
- Alex Bein (1952) "The Return to the Soil: a History of Jewish Settlement in Israel" (Translated from the Hebrew by Israel Schen)
- Alex Bein (1949) "Israel's Charter of Freedom"
- Aleks Bain (1945) Toldot ha-hityashvut ha-Tsiyonit mi-teḳufat Hertsl ṿe-ʻad yamenu
- Alex Bein (1939) "Der Zionismus und sein Werk"
- Alex Bein (1934) "Theodor Herzl; Biographie. mit 63 Bildern und einer Ahnentafel."
  - Alex Bein, Maurice Samuel (translator), (1941) "Theodore [sic] Herzl: A Biography of the Founder of the Modern Zionism"

== See also ==
- List of Israel Prize recipients
