= Ranah Nazzal =

Jordanian writer and poet

- Born: 16 May 1969 (age 56); Taif, Saudi Arabia
- Education: Arabic and literature master's degree

Ranah Mustafa Ahmed Nazza (Arabic: رانة نزال; born 16 May 1969 in Taif, Saudi Arabia) is a Jordanian writer and poet. She is a member of the Jordanian Writers' Association. She first signed her poems as "Getan" and went from glitter to disclosure. Her poetry is characterized by Sufi vocabulary influenced by Ibn al-Faqir, Ibn al-Arabi, Al-Nafri and others.

== Education ==
In 1986, Ranah Nazzal completed public high school in Taif and studied Arabic language and literature at the University of Jordan, where she received her bachelor's degree in 1990 and her master's degree in 1993.

== Work ==
She taught in Jordan and Saudi Arabia. She has chaired the Department of Arabic at the King Abdullah University of Science and Technology in Saudi Arabia since 2010.

== Literary works ==
Ranah Nazzal published the following books between poetry, criticism and literature:

- "Whatever," poetry, published by the Arab Foundation for Studies and Publication, Beirut, 1998.
- "Blue Mood," poetry, published by Arab Foundation for Studies and Publishing, Beirut, 2007.
- "Beit Al Ain," poetry, published by the Arab Foundation for Studies and Publishing, Beirut, 2008."
- "Between the Hammer and the Anvil", "Critical Study, Lebanese Think Tank, Beirut, 2010.
- "A Blind Mouth and a Mute Memory," literary articles, published by Dar Zamnah, Oman, 2011.
- "In a Neighbourhood That Doesn't Die," texts released by Dar Azamanah, Oman, 2011.
- "Remote Night," Time Publishing and Distribution House, 2012
- "Learning and Active Education," a book in education and education, published by Time Publishing and Distribution, Amman, 2013.
- "The Rose's side," Agamat Publishing and Distribution House, Amman, 2014.
- "While it Was," Arab Foundation for Studies and Publication, 2019.
