= Khaled Nazzal =

Palestinian politician (1948–1986)

Central Committee Secretary of the Democratic Front for the Liberation of Palestine

Personal details
- Born: Khaled Ahmed Nazzel; 1948 Qabatiya, Jenin
- Died: 9 June 1986 (aged 37–38) Athens, Greece
- Spouse: Rima Nazzal

Khaled Nazzal (1948–1986) was the central committee secretary of the Democratic Front for the Liberation of Palestine (DFLP), a Marxist-Leninist faction of the Palestinian Liberation Organisation. In this role, he directed militant operations including the 1974 Ma'alot attack, and was assassinated in Athens in 1986 in a killing widely attributed to Mossad.

== Biography ==
Born Khaled Ahmed Nazzal in Qabatiya, Jenin in 1948, he joined the Palestinian forces in 1967, and in 1971 he joined Damascus University.

Nazzal was "a leader" of the group who organized the Ma'alot Massacre, a 1974 terrorist attack that saw 22 Israeli schoolchildren and their three teachers killed following a two-day hostage standoff.

Nazzal was married to women's rights activist Rima Nazzal. He was assassinated in Athens, Greece, on 9 June 1986 by Mossad agents.

As of 2014 his sister Rehab Nazzal who is an artist was living in Canada.

A public square in Jenin was named for Nazzal, drawing sharp criticism from Israeli Prime Minister Benjamin Netanyahu. It was forcefully removed by the Israeli forces in June 2017. However, another one was set up in the same place in the late June.
