= Ibrahim Mudayris =

Palestinian imam

Sheikh Ibrahim Mudayris, also spelled Mdeiras, is a Palestinian Islamist imam of the Shafi'i school. He has a close following in Gaza City.

== Views ==
On 21 March 2003, Palestinian Authority Television broadcast one of his live sermons from Sheikh Ijlin Mosque in Gaza. In the sermon, he declared "Oh Muslims! Wake up from your slumber! It is your faith that is under attack!" and said that "America will be annihilated".

In another sermon, broadcast on 13 May, 2003, Mudayris "compared Jews (in the context of land conflicts) to 'a virus, like AIDS'".
