= Felesteen (newspaper) =

Palestinian Arabic language daily newspaper

- Felestin in May 2021, during the 2021 Israel–Palestine crisis
- Type: Daily newspaper
- Format: Broadsheet
- Owner(s): Al Wasat Media and Publishing Company
- Founded: 2006; 20 years ago
- Political alignment: Anti-Zionism; Palestinian nationalism Islamism
- Language: Arabic
- Headquarters: Palestine, Gaza
- Country: Palestine
- Website: https://felesteen.news

Felesteen (Arabic: فلسطين; sometimes Felestin) is a Palestinian Arabic language daily newspaper based in Gaza and founded in 2006. It is published in broadsheet format. It is the largest daily newspaper in the Gaza Strip by circulation. Israeli sources have referred to the paper as a "Hamas daily", an assessment shared by Fateh; it was banned in areas under the control of the Palestinian Authority from 2007 to 2014, when the ban was lifted after reconciliation between Fatah and Hamas.
