= The Earth Gods =

1931 book by Kahlil Gibran

- Author: Kahlil Gibran
- Language: English
- Publisher: Alfred A. Knopf
- Publication date: 1931
- Publication place: United States
- Media type: Book

The Earth Gods is a literary work written by poet and philosopher Kahlil Gibran. It was originally published in 1931, also the year of the author's death. The story is structured as a dialogue between three unnamed earth gods, only referred to as First God, Second God, and Third God. As is typical of Gibran's works, it is a classic that focuses on spiritual concepts.

== Synopsis ==
The narrator describes the appearance of three great earth gods at nightfall on the mountain. They begin a discussion. Their conversation covers many topics that deal with spirituality and the human condition. The gods comment often on love and the heart, sharing each of their views. The gods then close the discussion by announcing their rest.

== In the author's own words ==
In Barbara Young's This Man from Lebanon: A Study of Kahlil Gibran, the author is quoted as saying: "It was written out of the poet’s hell—a process of childbirth and child-bearing."

== Public domain ==
The Earth Gods is available in the public domain in Australia. It became available in 2001. It will become available in the United States in 2026.
