= Barbara Young (poet) =

American art and literary critic

- Born: Henrietta Breckenridge Boughton; 1878
- Died: 1961 (aged 82–83)
- Occupations: Art and literary critic, poet

Henrietta Breckenridge Boughton (1878–1961), better known by her pen name Barbara Young, was an American art and literary critic in the 1920s, as well as a poet. She met Kahlil Gibran at a reading of The Prophet organized by rector William Norman Guthrie in St. Mark's Church in-the-Bowery and served as his secretary from 1925 until his death. She revised and published Gibran's book The Garden of the Prophet, after Mary Haskell made her revisions. Her book This Man from Lebanon: A Study of Kahlil Gibran was published by Alfred A. Knopf on January 15, 1945. Some of her writing was featured in Thomas Moult's anthology The Best Poems of 1931.
