= SS Sinaia =

Ocean liner (1924–1944)

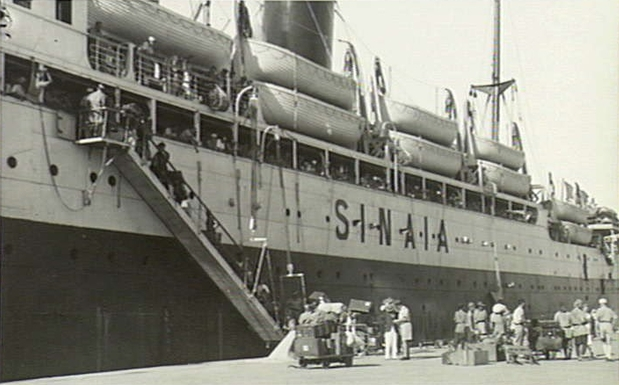
- Sinaia in Beirut, September 1941.

History

France
- Name: Sinaia
- Owner: Fabre Line
- Port of registry: Marseille
- Builder: Barclay, Curle & Co. Ltd.
- Launched: 19 August 1922
- Completed: October 1922
- Fate: scuttled 1944

General characteristics
- Type: Ocean liner
- Tonnage: 8,567 GRT, 5,072 NRT
- Length: 439.7 ft (134.0 m)
- Beam: 56.1 ft (17.1 m)
- Depth: 34.3 ft (10.5 m)
- Decks: 3
- Installed power: 568 NHP
- Propulsion: 2 × triple-expansion engines; 2 × screws
- Speed: 13 1/2 knots (25 km/h)

SS Sinaia was an ocean liner built in 1924 in Whiteinch, Glasgow by Barclay, Curle & Co. Ltd.for the Fabre Line. Its first visit to Providence, Rhode Island, was made on June 28, 1925.

The liner carried Kahlil Gibran's body from Providence, Rhode Island, to the French-controlled Lebanon in 1931. In 1939 Sinaia left the port of Sète with Spanish Republicans seeking asylum in Mexico.

Sinaia was scuttled in 1944.
