= Gibran Museum =

Biographical museum in Bsharri, Lebanon

Coordinates: 34°14′59″N 36°1′8″E

Gibran Museum متحف جبران خليل جبران
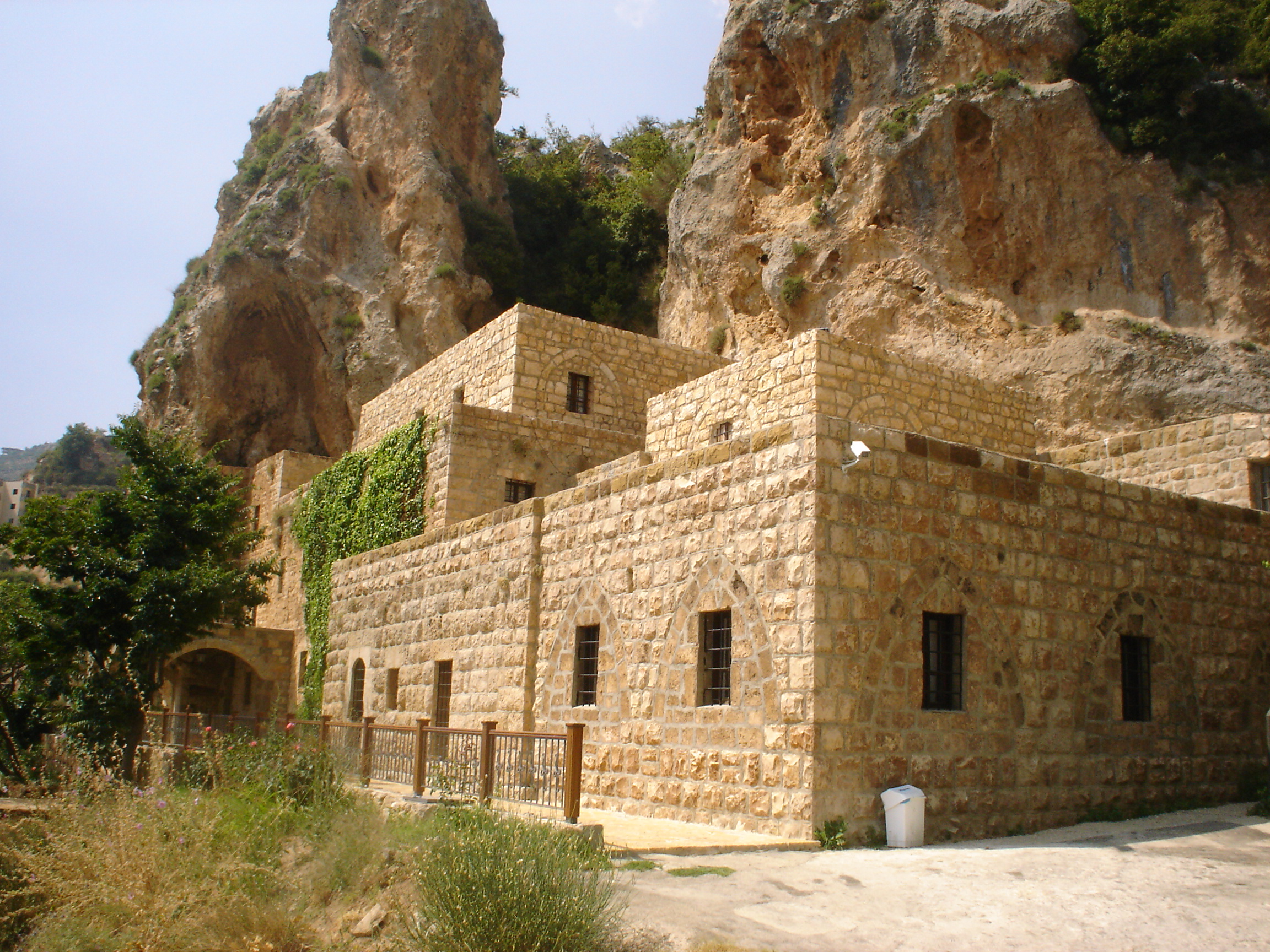
- Established: 1935
- Location: Bsharri, North Governorate; Lebanon
- Website: https://www.gibrankhalilgibran.org

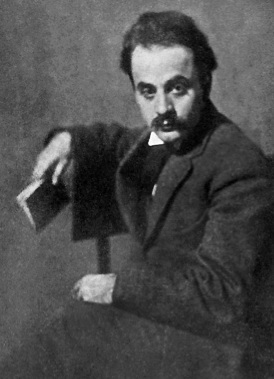
Kahlil Gibran

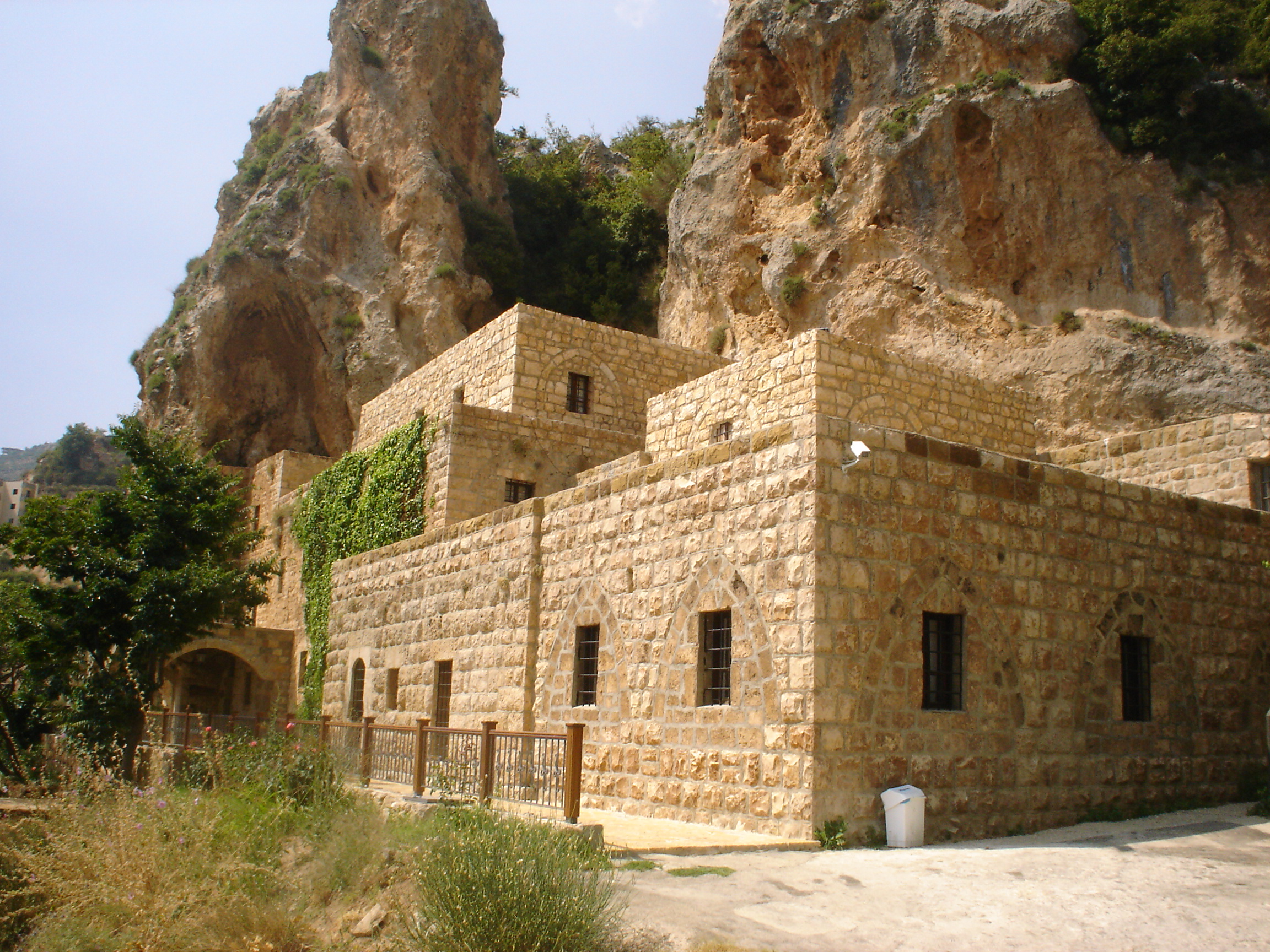
Gibran Museum

The Gibran Museum, formerly the Monastery of Mar Sarkis, is a biographical museum in Bsharri, Lebanon, 120 kilometres (75 mi) from Beirut. It is dedicated to the Lebanese writer, philosopher, and artist Kahlil Gibran.

The museum was an old cavern where many hermits sought refuge since the 7th century. By the end of the 17th century, the people of Bsharri offered the hermitage the existing building erected during the 16th century and the surrounding oak forest to the Carmelite Fathers who were then living in the Qadisha valley with the Monks of Saint Elisha Monastery.

The Carmelite Fathers built the monastery progressively until 1862. In 1908, while some of the monks moved towards Bsharri to build the Saint Joseph Monastery, the others remained in the valley to take care of the whole property.

In 1926, while still in New York, Gibran expressed the desire of purchasing from the Carmelite Fathers the hermitage, the monastery, and the adjoining forest in order to make it his retreat and final resting place. He died on April 10, 1931. On August 22, 1931, Gibran's body reached Bsharri. Mariana, his sister, bought the monastery and the adjoining lands and thus fulfilled a part of her brother's will: to make of the hermitage his burial place.

Founded in 1935, the Gibran Museum possesses 440 original paintings and drawings of Gibran and his tomb. It also includes his furniture and belongings from his studio when he lived in New York City and his private manuscripts. In 1975, the Gibran National Committee restored and expanded the monastery to house more exhibits and again expanded it in 1995.

On August 15, 1995, the museum reopened its doors to the public. The Furniture, Gibran's notebooks, his personal library, and the exhibited objects and paintings were all in his apartment in New York. All the masterpieces are exhibited in the 16 rooms of the three floors of the museum leading in the end to Gibran's tomb.

Rare are the paintings that Gibran dated, signed, and titled. He used to say "Visions cannot be titled." And to those who wondered why he didn't sign his paintings, he replied: "Wherever they might be found, my paintings shall be known as mine."
