= The Madman (book) =

1918 book

The Madman, His Parables and Poems
- Title page for The Madman, His Parables and Poems (1918)
- Author: Kahlil Gibran
- Illustrator: Kahlil Gibran
- Language: English
- Publisher: Alfred A. Knopf
- Publication date: 1918
- Publication place: United States
- Text: The Madman, His Parables and Poems at Wikisource

The Madman, His Parables and Poems is a book written by Kahlil Gibran, which was published in the United States by Alfred A. Knopf in 1918, with illustrations reproduced from original drawings by the author. It was Gibran's first book in English to be published, also marking the beginning of the second phase of Gibran's career. May Ziadeh, with whom Gibran had been corresponding since 1912, reviewed it in Al-Hilal, a magazine in Egypt.
