= Kahlil Gibran Memorial Garden (Washington, D.C.) =

Memorial by Gordon Kray in Washington, D.C., U.S.

- Location: Washington, D.C., United States
- Coordinates: 38°55′13.7″N 77°3′41″W
- Designer: Gordon Kray
- Dedicated date: May 24, 1991

The Kahlil Gibran Memorial Garden is a public garden located at 3100 Massachusetts Avenue, N.W. Washington, D.C., "within a wooded ravine known as Woodland-Normanstone Park". At its center are a bronze sculpture of the Lebanese-American writer, poet and visual artist Kahlil Gibran by Gordon Kray and a star-shaped fountain surrounded by limestone benches engraved with quotes of Gibran.

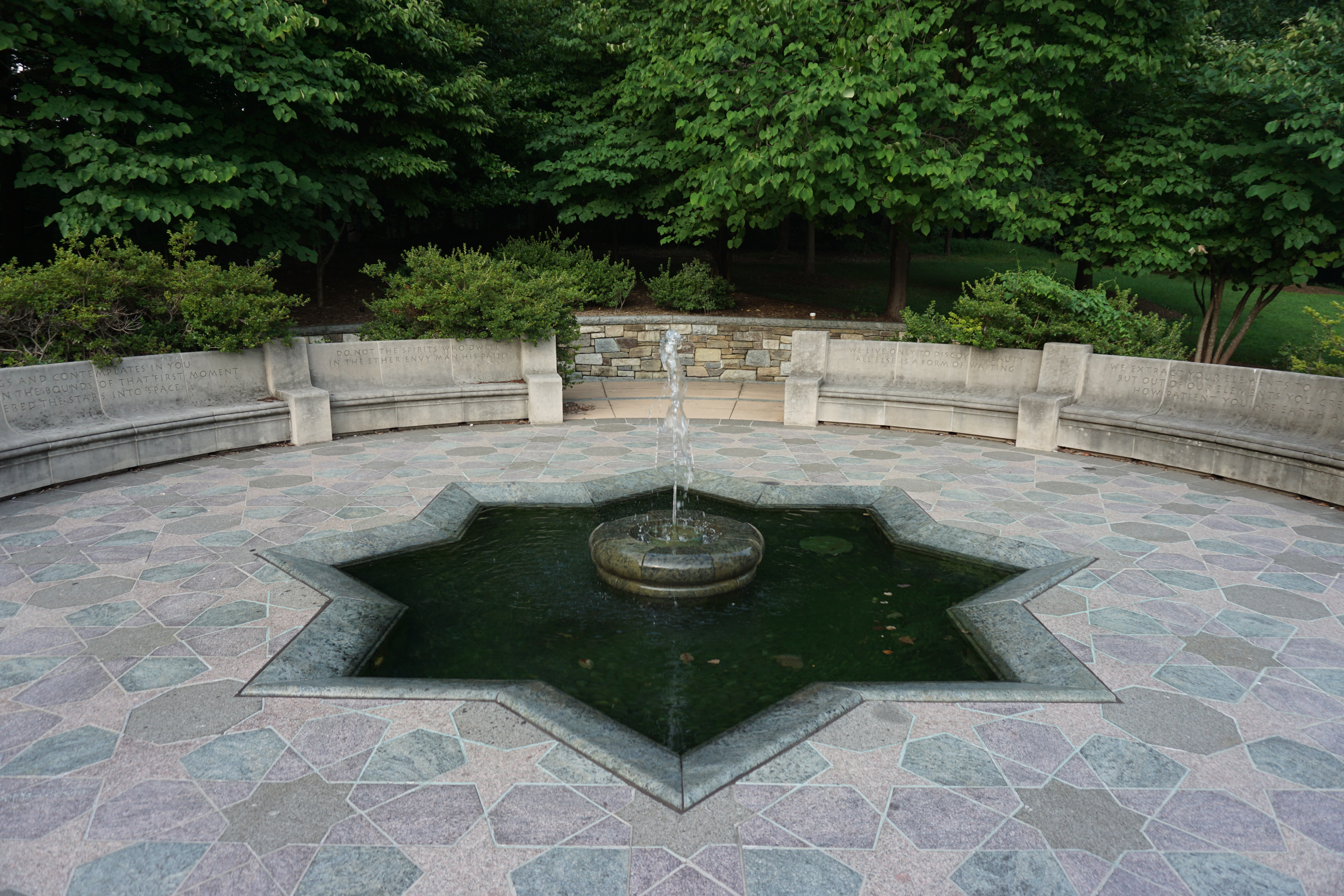
The fountain

The memorial garden was dedicated on May 24, 1991, by President George H. W. Bush. The fundraising was organized by the Kahlil Gibran Centennial Foundation, formed to celebrate the 100th anniversary of the poet's birth in Bsharri.
