= Kahlil Gibran =

Lebanese American artist, poet, and writer (1883–1931)

- جُبْرَان خَلِيل جُبْرَان
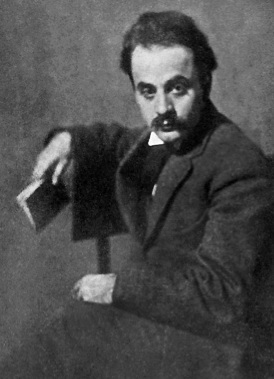
- Gibran in 1913
- Born: Jubrān Khalīl Jubrān; January 6, 1883; Bsharri, Mount Lebanon Mutasarrifate, Ottoman Empire (present-day Lebanon)
- Died: April 10, 1931 (aged 48); New York City, U.S.
- Resting place: Bsharri, Lebanon
- Education: Académie Julian
- Occupations: Writer; poet; visual artist; philosopher
- Known for: Leading author of the Modern Arabic literature
- Style: Symbolic; prose poetry
- Title: Chairman of the Pen League
- Writing career
- Language: Varieties of Arabic; English
- Years active: 1904 to 1931
- Period: Modern (20th century)
- Genres: Poem; parable; fable; aphorism; novel/novella; short story; play; essay; letter
- Subjects: Spiritual love; justice
- Notable works: The Prophet; The Madman; Broken Wings
- Movements: Mahjar; neo-romanticism; symbolism

Signature
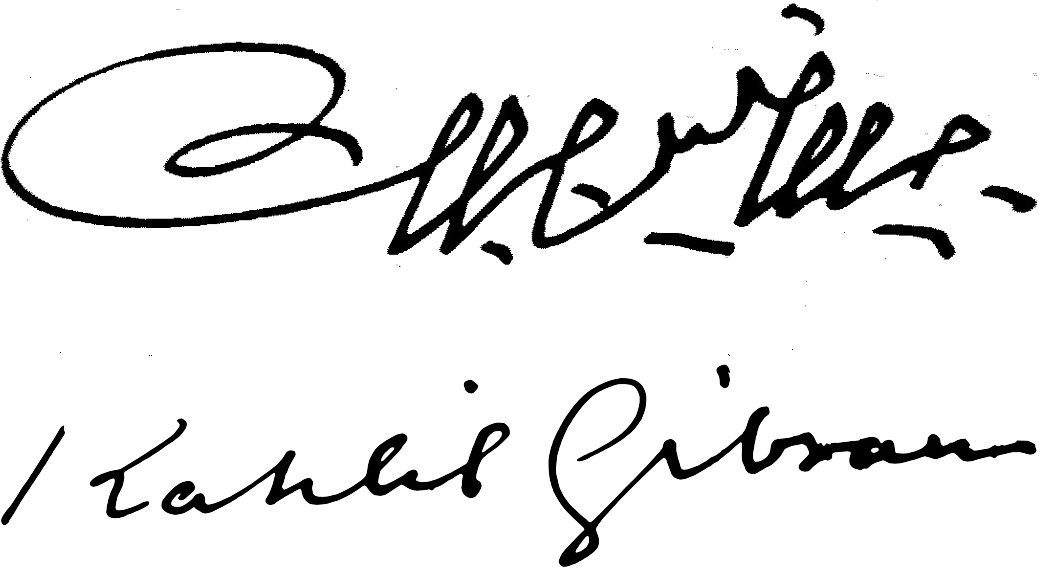

Jubrān Khalīl Jubrān (Arabic: جُبْرَان خَلِيل جُبْرَان; (Note: His name may be rendered in the traditional Arabic style as جبران بن خليل بن ميخائيل بن سعد جبران, ALA-LC: Jubrān bin Khalīl bin Mīkhāʼīl bin Saʽd Jubrān.) January 6, 1883 – April 10, 1931), usually referred to in English as Kahlil Gibran, (Note: Pronounced /kɑːˈliːl dʒɪˈbrɑːn/ kah-LEEL jib-RAHN.) (Note: Due to a mistake made by the Josiah Quincy School of Boston after his immigration to the United States with his mother and siblings, he was registered as Kahlil Gibran, the spelling he used thenceforth in English. Other sources use Khalil Gibran, reflecting the typical English spelling of the forename Khalil, although Gibran continued to use his full birth name for publications in Arabic.) was a Lebanese-American writer, poet and visual artist. He was also considered a philosopher, although he himself rejected the title. He is best known as the author of The Prophet, which was first published in the United States in 1923 and has since become one of the best-selling books of all time, having been translated into more than 100 languages. (Note: Gibran is also considered to be the third-best-selling poet of all time, behind Shakespeare and Laozi.)

Born in Bsharri, a village of the Ottoman-ruled Mount Lebanon Mutasarrifate to a Maronite Christian family, young Gibran immigrated with his mother and siblings to the United States in 1895. As his mother worked as a seamstress, he was enrolled at a school in Boston, where his creative abilities were quickly noticed by a teacher who presented him to photographer and publisher F. Holland Day. Gibran was sent back to his native land by his family at the age of fifteen to enroll at the Collège de la Sagesse in Beirut. Returning to Boston upon his youngest sister's death in 1902, he lost his older half-brother and his mother the following year, seemingly relying afterwards on his remaining sister's income from her work at a dressmaker's shop for some time.

In 1904, Gibran's drawings were displayed for the first time at Day's studio in Boston, and his first book in Arabic was published in 1905 in New York City. With the financial help of a newly met benefactress, Mary Haskell, Gibran studied art in Paris from 1908 to 1910. While there, he came in contact with Syrian political thinkers promoting rebellion in Ottoman Syria after the Young Turk Revolution; some of Gibran's writings, voicing the same ideas as well as anti-clericalism, would eventually be banned by the Ottoman authorities. In 1911, Gibran settled in New York, where his first book in English, The Madman, was published by Alfred A. Knopf in 1918, with writing of The Prophet or The Earth Gods also underway. His visual artwork was shown at Montross Gallery in 1914, and at the galleries of M. Knoedler & Co. in 1917. He had also been corresponding remarkably with May Ziadeh since 1912. In 1920, Gibran re-founded the Pen League with fellow Mahjari poets. By the time of his death at the age of 48 from cirrhosis and incipient tuberculosis in one lung, he had achieved literary fame on "both sides of the Atlantic Ocean", and The Prophet had already been translated into German and French. His body was transferred to his birth village of Bsharri (in present-day Lebanon), to which he had bequeathed all future royalties on his books, and where a museum dedicated to his works now stands.

In the words of Suheil Bushrui and Joe Jenkins, Gibran's life was "often caught between Nietzschean rebellion, Blakean pantheism and Sufi mysticism". Gibran discussed different themes in his writings and explored diverse literary forms. Salma Khadra Jayyusi has called him "the single most important influence on Arabic poetry and literature during the first half of [the twentieth] century", and he is still celebrated as a literary hero in Lebanon. At the same time, "most of Gibran's paintings expressed his personal vision, incorporating spiritual and mythological symbolism", with art critic Alice Raphael recognizing in the painter a classicist, whose work owed "more to the findings of Da Vinci than it [did] to any modern insurgent". His "prodigious body of work" has been described as "an artistic legacy to people of all nations".

== Life and career ==
=== Childhood ===
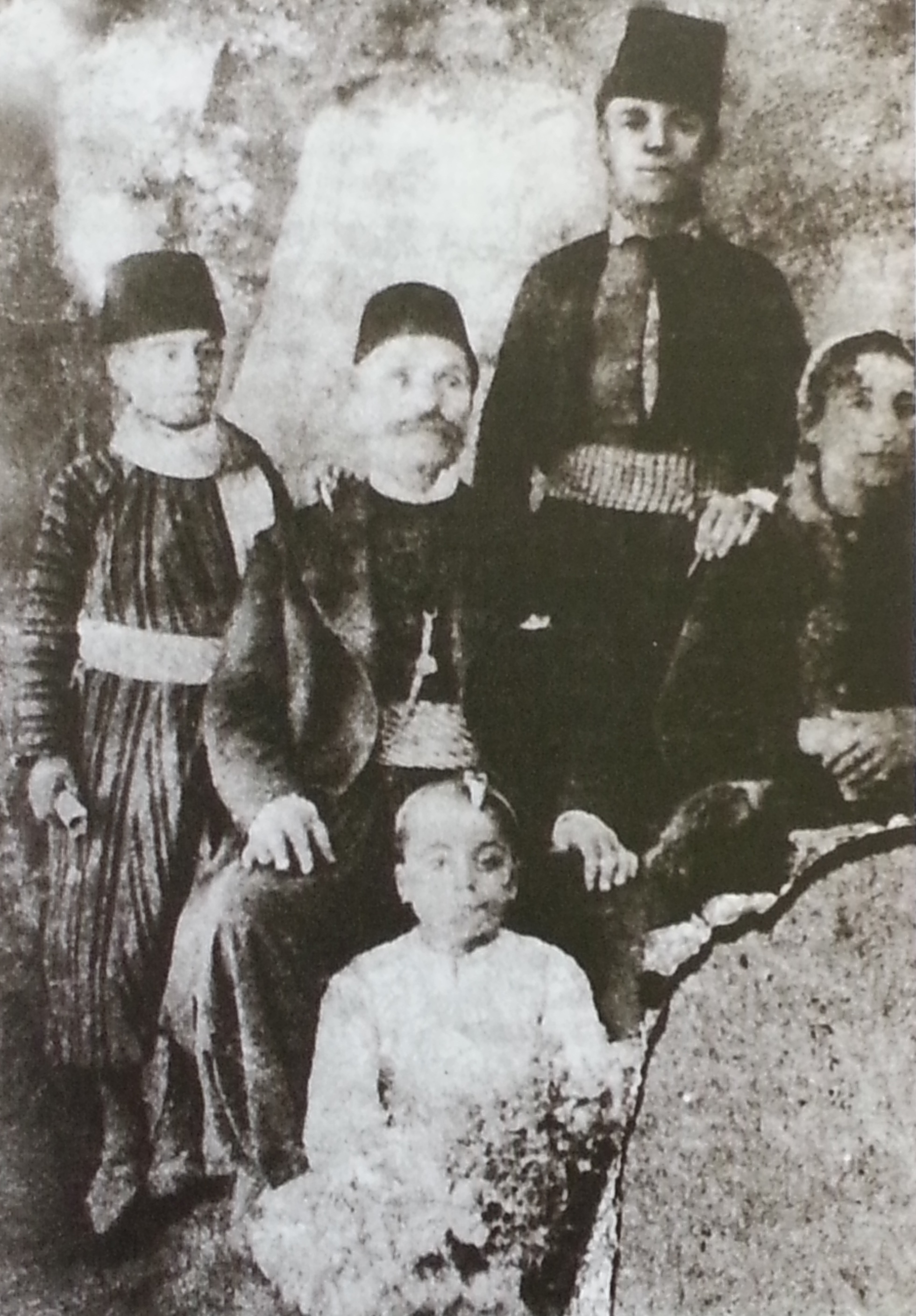
The Gibran family in the 1880s (Note: Left to right: Gibran, Khalil (father), Sultana (sister), Boutros (half-brother), Kamila (mother).)

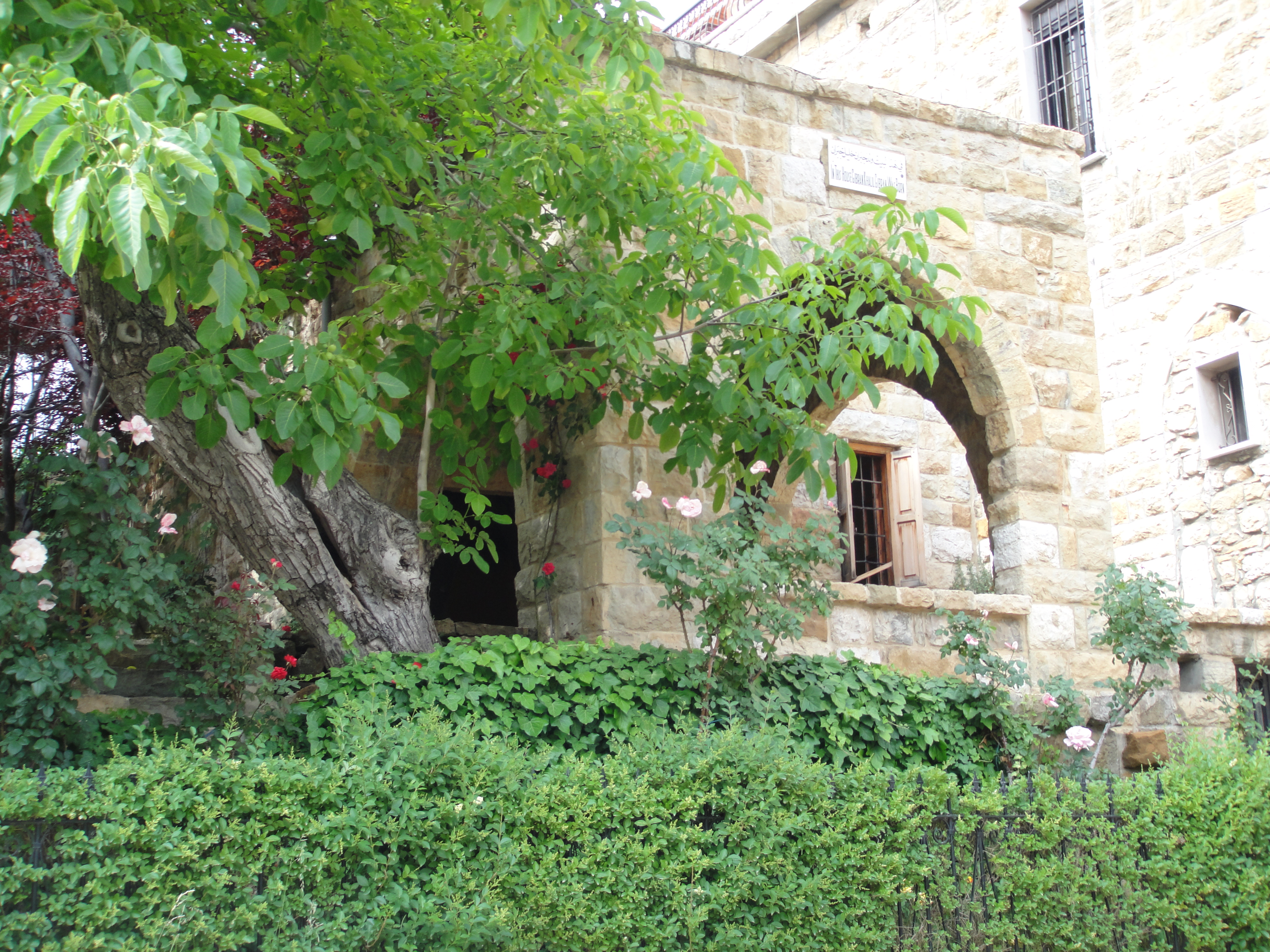
The Gibran family's home in Bsharri, Lebanon

Gibran was born January 6, 1883, in the village of Bsharri in the Mount Lebanon Mutasarrifate (modern-day Lebanon). The few records mentioning the Gibrans indicate that they arrived at Bsharri towards the end of the 17th century. While a family myth links them to Chaldean sources, a more plausible story relates that the Gibran family came from Damascus, Syria in the 16th-century and settled on a farm near Baalbek, later moving to Bash'elah in 1672. Another story places the origin of the Gibran family in Acre before migrating to Bash'elah in the year 1300. Gibran's parents, Khalil Sa'ad Gibran and Kamila Rahmeh, the daughter of a priest, were Maronite Christian. As written by Bushrui and Jenkins, they would set for Gibran an example of tolerance by "refusing to perpetuate religious prejudice and bigotry in their daily lives." Kamila's paternal grandfather had converted from Islam to Christianity. She was thirty when Gibran was born, and Gibran's father, Khalil, was her third husband. Gibran had two younger sisters, Marianna and Sultana, and an older half-brother, Boutros, from one of Kamila's previous marriages. Gibran's family lived in poverty. In 1888, Gibran entered Bsharri's one-class school, which was run by a priest, and there he learnt the rudiments of Arabic, Syriac, and arithmetic. (Note: According to Khalil and Jean Gibran, this did not count as "formal" schooling.)

Gibran's father initially worked in an apothecary, but he had gambling debts he was unable to pay. He went to work for a local Ottoman-appointed administrator. In 1891, while acting as a tax collector, he was removed and his staff was investigated. Khalil was imprisoned for embezzlement, and his family's property was confiscated by the authorities. Kamila decided to follow her brother to the United States. Although Khalil was released in 1894, Kamila remained resolved and left for New York on June 25, 1895, taking Boutros, Gibran, Marianna and Sultana with her.

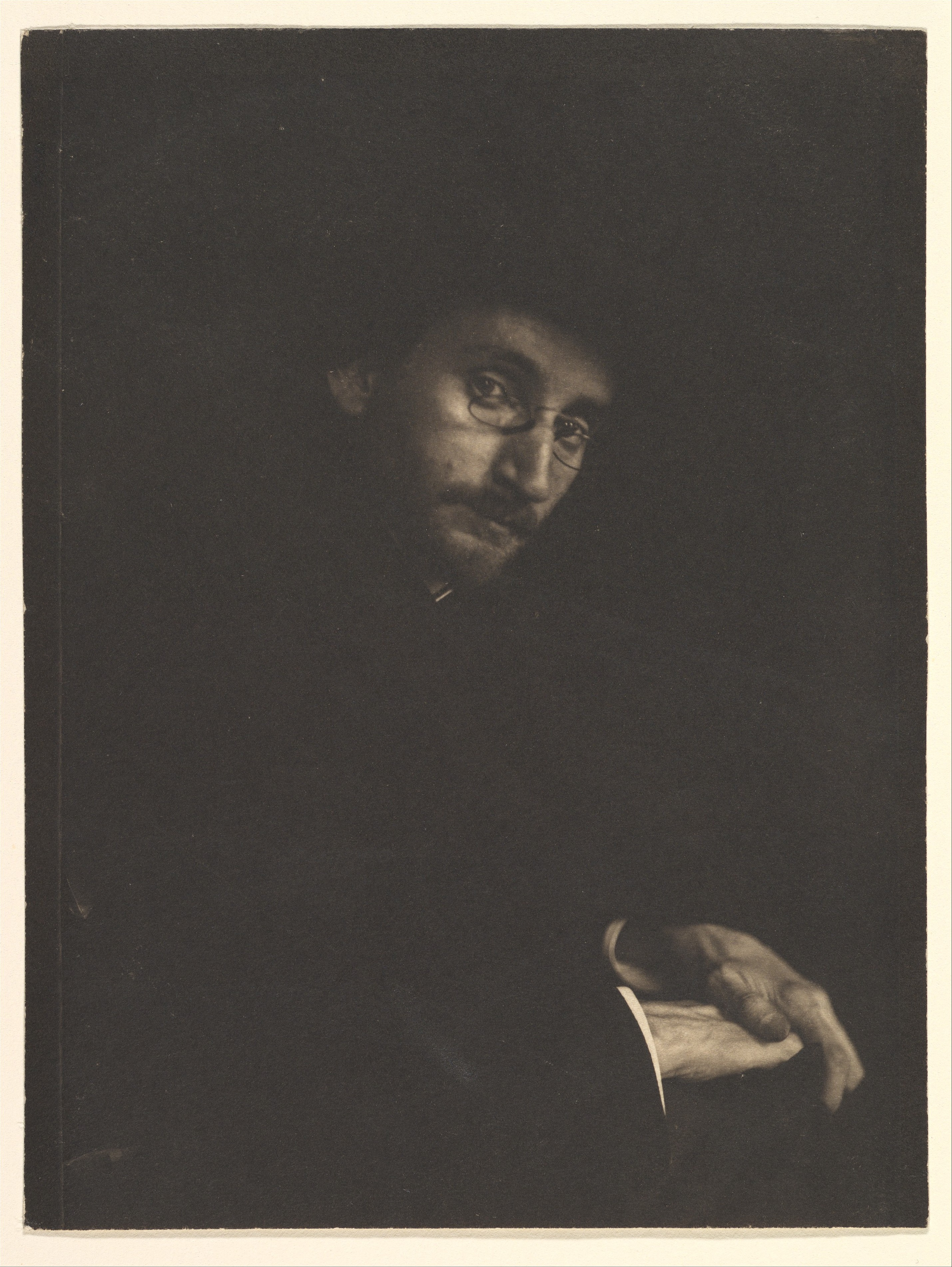
F. Holland Day, c. 1898

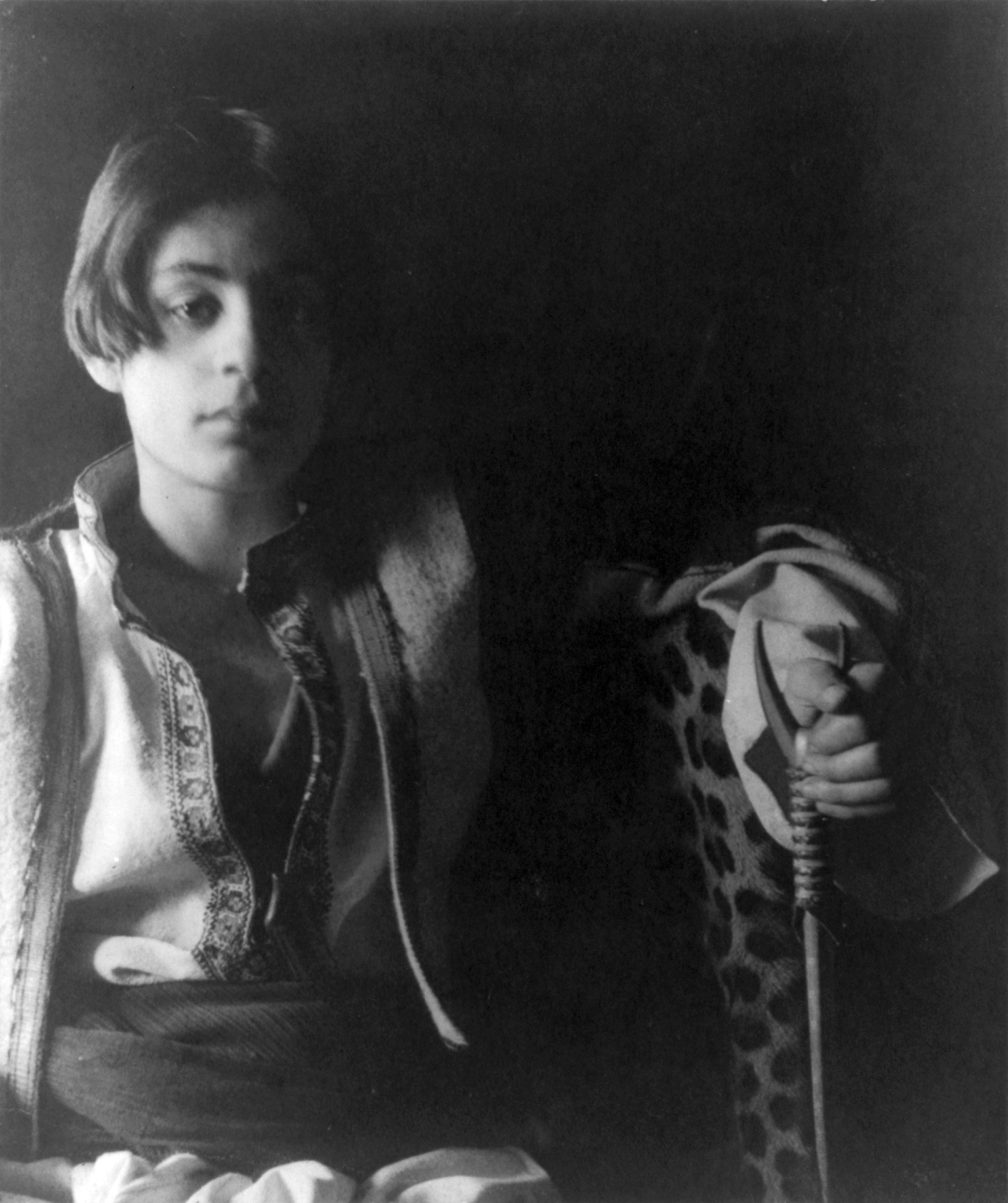
Photograph of Gibran by F. Holland Day, c. 1898

Kamila and her children settled in Boston's South End, at the time the second-largest Syrian-Lebanese-American community in the United States. Gibran entered the Josiah Quincy School on September 30, 1895. School officials placed him in a special class for immigrants to learn English. His name was registered using the anglicized spelling 'Kahlil Gibran'. His mother began working as a seamstress peddler, selling lace and linens that she carried from door-to-door. His half-brother Boutros opened a shop. Gibran also enrolled in an art school at Denison House, a nearby settlement house. Through his teachers there, he was introduced to the avant-garde Boston artist, photographer and publisher F. Holland Day, who encouraged and supported Gibran in his creative endeavors. In March 1898, Gibran met Josephine Preston Peabody, eight years his senior, at an exhibition of Day's photographs "in which Gibran's face was a major subject." Gibran would develop a romantic attachment to her. The same year, a publisher used some of Gibran's drawings for book covers.

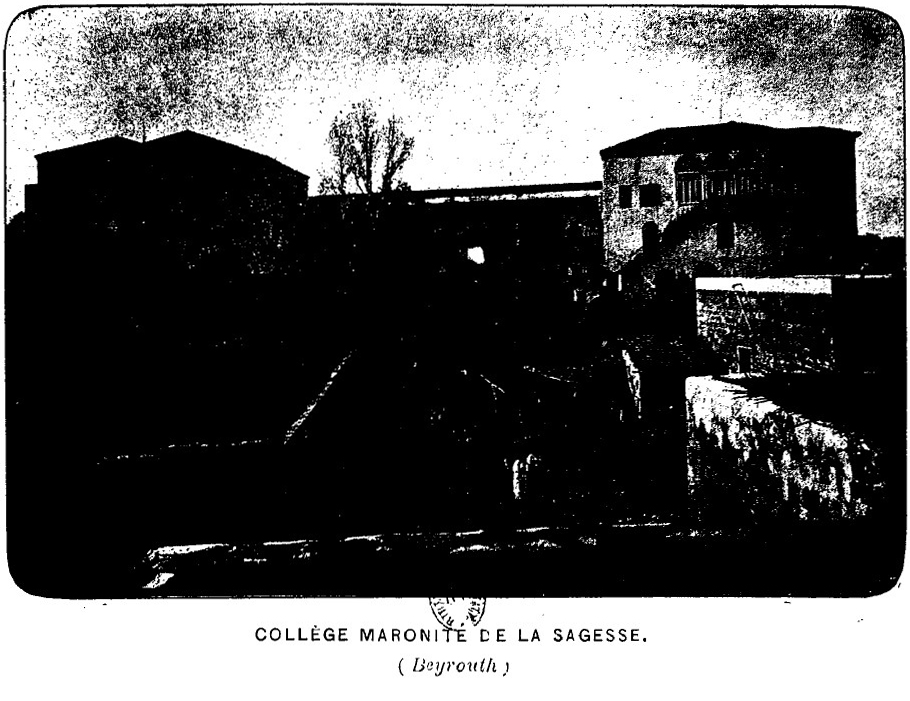
The Collège maronite de la Sagesse in Beirut

Kamila and Boutros wanted Gibran to absorb more of his own heritage rather than just the Western aesthetic culture he was attracted to. Thus, at the age of 15, Gibran returned to his homeland to study Arabic literature for three years at the Collège de la Sagesse, a Maronite-run institute in Beirut, also learning French. (Note: American journalist Alma Reed would relate that Gibran spoke French fluently, besides Arabic and English.) In his final year at the school, Gibran created a student magazine with other students, including Youssef Howayek (who would remain a lifelong friend of his), and he was made the "college poet". Gibran graduated from the school at eighteen with high honors, then went to Paris to learn painting, visiting Greece, Italy, and Spain on his way there from Beirut. In Paris, Gibran socialized within the Parisian intellectual establishment, he was acquainted with Auguste Rodin and recognized as accomplished artist.

On April 2, 1902, Sultana died at the age of 14, from what is believed to have been tuberculosis. Upon learning about it, Gibran returned to Boston, arriving two weeks after Sultana's death. (Note: He came through Ellis Island (this was his second time) on May 10.) The following year, on March 12, Boutros died of the same disease, with his mother passing from cancer on June 28. Two days later, Peabody "left him without explanation." Marianna supported Gibran and herself by working at a dressmaker's shop.

=== Debuts, Mary Haskell, and second stay in Paris ===
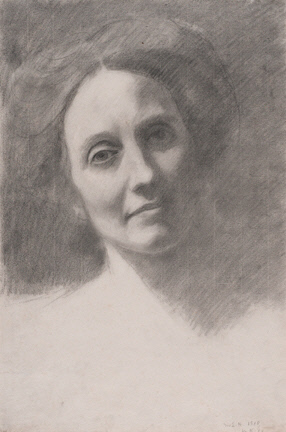
Portrait of Mary Haskell by Gibran, 1910

Gibran held the first art exhibition of his drawings in January 1904 in Boston at Day's studio. During this exhibition, Gibran met Mary Haskell, the headmistress of a girls' school in the city, nine years his senior. The two formed a friendship that lasted the rest of Gibran's life. Haskell would spend large sums of money to support Gibran and would also edit all of his English writings. The nature of their romantic relationship remains obscure; while some biographers assert the two were lovers but never married because Haskell's family objected, other evidence suggests that their relationship was never physically consummated. Gibran and Haskell were engaged briefly between 1910 and 1911. According to Joseph P. Ghougassian, Gibran had proposed to her "not knowing how to repay back in gratitude to Miss Haskell," but Haskell called it off, making it "clear to him that she preferred his friendship to any burdensome tie of marriage." Haskell would later marry Jacob Florance Minis in 1926, while remaining Gibran's close friend, patroness and benefactress, and using her influence to advance his career.

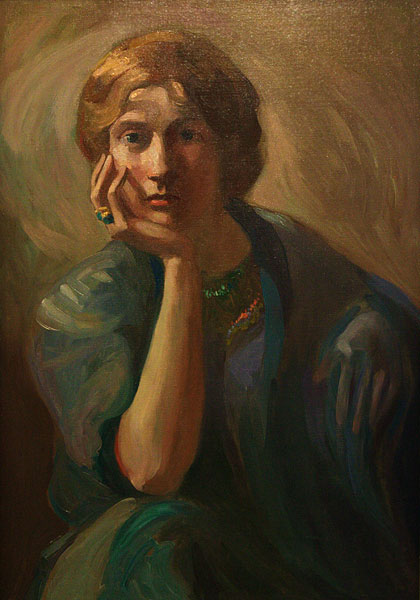
Portrait of Charlotte Teller, c. 1911

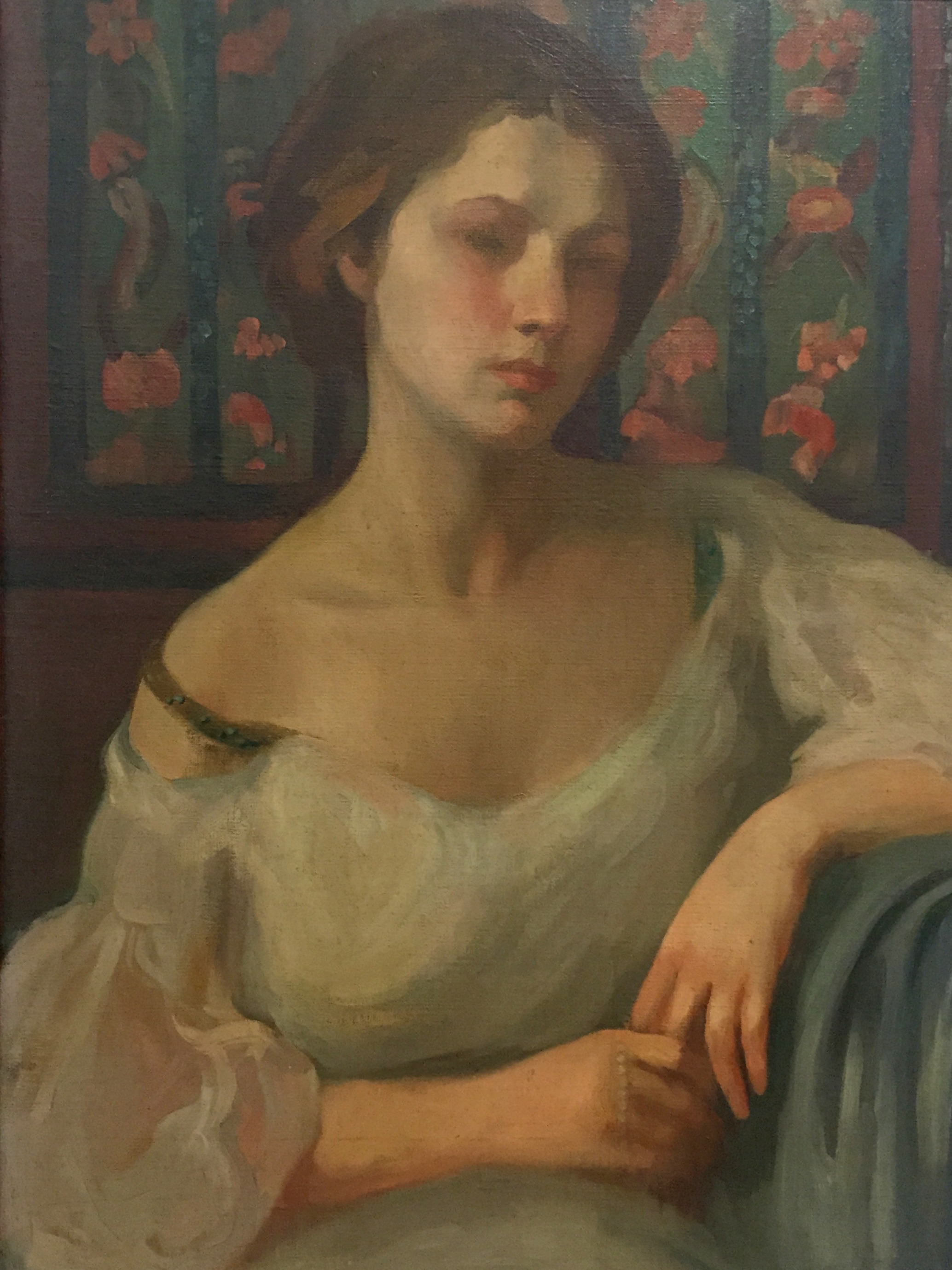
Portrait of Émilie Michel (Micheline), 1909

It was in 1904 also that Gibran met Amin al-Ghurayyib, editor of Al-Mohajer ('The Emigrant'), where Gibran started to publish articles. In 1905, Gibran's first published written work was A Profile of the Art of Music, in Arabic, by Al-Mohajer's printing department in New York City. His next work, Nymphs of the Valley, was published the following year, also in Arabic. On January 27, 1908, Haskell introduced Gibran to her friend writer Charlotte Teller, aged 31, and in February, to Émilie Michel (Micheline), a French teacher at Haskell's school, aged 19. Both Teller and Micheline agreed to pose for Gibran as models and became close friends of his. The same year, Gibran published Spirits Rebellious in Arabic, a novel deeply critical of secular and spiritual authority. According to Barbara Young, a late acquaintance of Gibran, "in an incredibly short time it was burned in the market place in Beirut by priestly zealots who pronounced it 'dangerous, revolutionary, and poisonous to youth.'" The Maronite Patriarchate would let the rumor of his excommunication wander, but would never officially pronounce it.

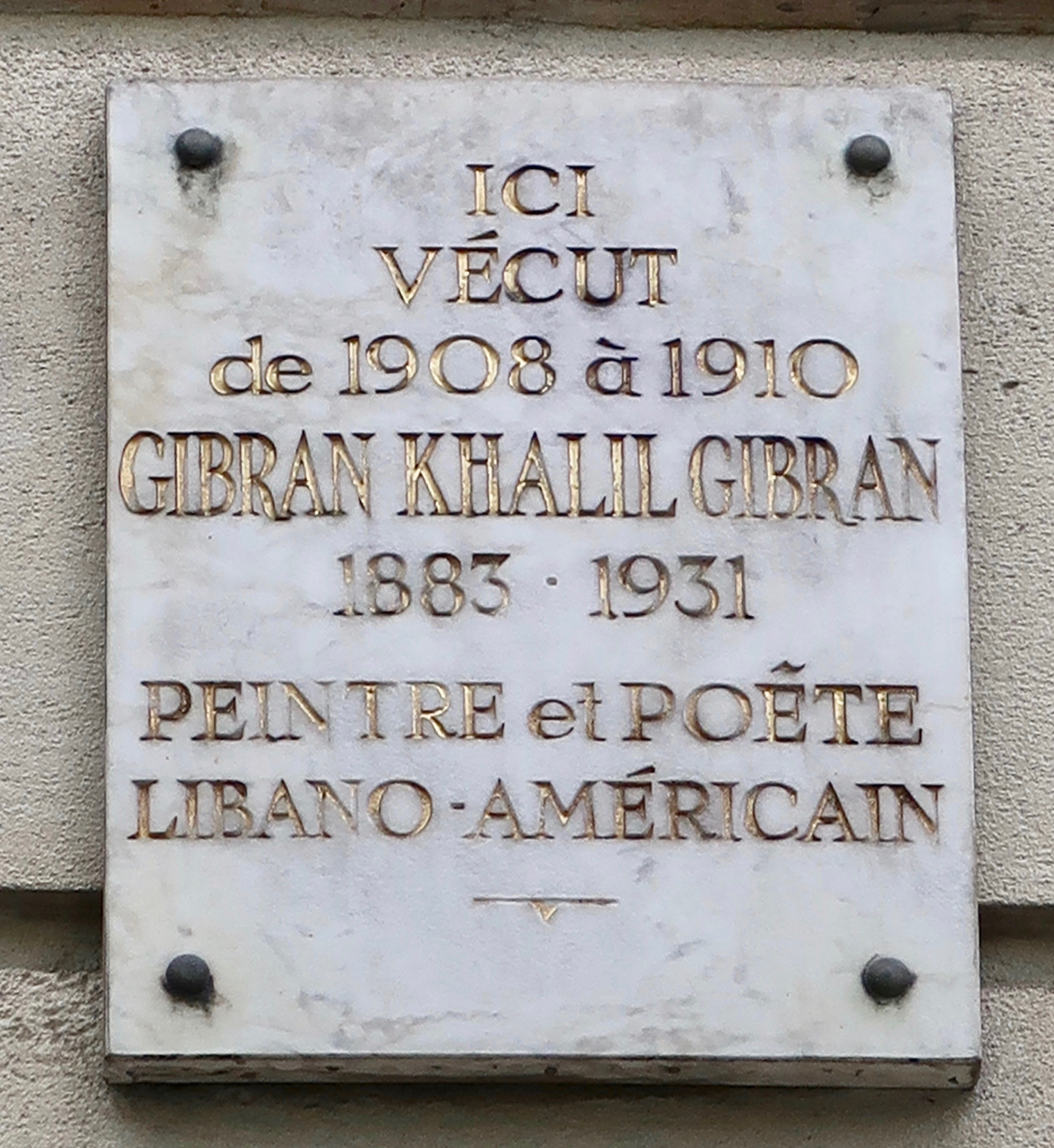
Plaque at 14 Avenue du Maine, Paris, where Gibran lived from 1908 to 1910

In July 1908, with Haskell's financial support, Gibran went to study art in Paris at the Académie Julian where he joined the atelier of Jean-Paul Laurens. Gibran had accepted Haskell's offer partly so as to distance himself from Micheline, "for he knew that this love was contrary to his sense of gratefulness toward Miss Haskell"; however, "to his surprise Micheline came unexpectedly to him in Paris." "She became pregnant, but the pregnancy was ectopic, and she had to have an abortion, probably in France." Micheline had returned to the United States by late October. Gibran would pay her a visit upon her return to Paris in July 1910, but there would be no hint of intimacy left between them.

By early February 1909, Gibran had "been working for a few weeks in the studio of Pierre Marcel-Béronneau", and he "used his sympathy towards Béronneau as an excuse to leave the Académie Julian altogether." In December 1909, (Note: Gibran's father had died in June.) Gibran started a series of pencil portraits that he would later call "The Temple of Art", featuring "famous men and women artists of the day" and "a few of Gibran's heroes from past times." (Note: Included in the Temple of Art series are portraits of Paul Bartlett, Claude Debussy, Edmond Rostand, Henri Rochefort, W.B. Yeats, Carl Jung, and Auguste Rodin. Gibran reportedly met the latter on a couple of occasions during his Parisian stay to draw his portrait; however, Gibran biographer Robin Waterfield argues that "on neither occasion was any degree of intimacy attained", and that the portrait may well have been made from memory or from a photograph. Gibran met Yeats through a friend of Haskell in Boston in September 1911, drawing his portrait on October 1 of that year.) While in Paris, Gibran also entered into contact with Syrian political dissidents, in whose activities he would attempt to be more involved upon his return to the United States. In June 1910, Gibran visited London with Howayek and Ameen Rihani, whom Gibran had met in Paris. Rihani, who was six years older than Gibran, would be Gibran's role model for a while, and a friend until at least May 1912. (Note: Gibran would illustrate Rihani's Book of Khalid, published 1911.) Gibran biographer Robin Waterfield argues that, by 1918, "as Gibran's role changed from that of angry young man to that of prophet, Rihani could no longer act as a paradigm". Haskell (in her private journal entry of May 29, 1924) and Howayek also provided hints at an enmity that began between Gibran and Rihani sometime after May 1912.

=== Return to the United States and growing reputation ===
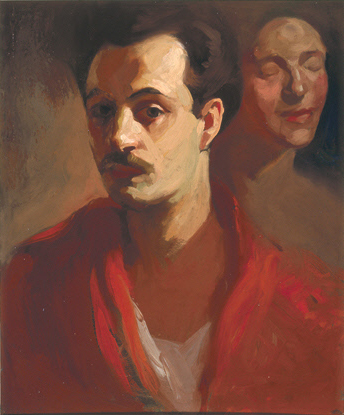
Self-Portrait, c. 1911

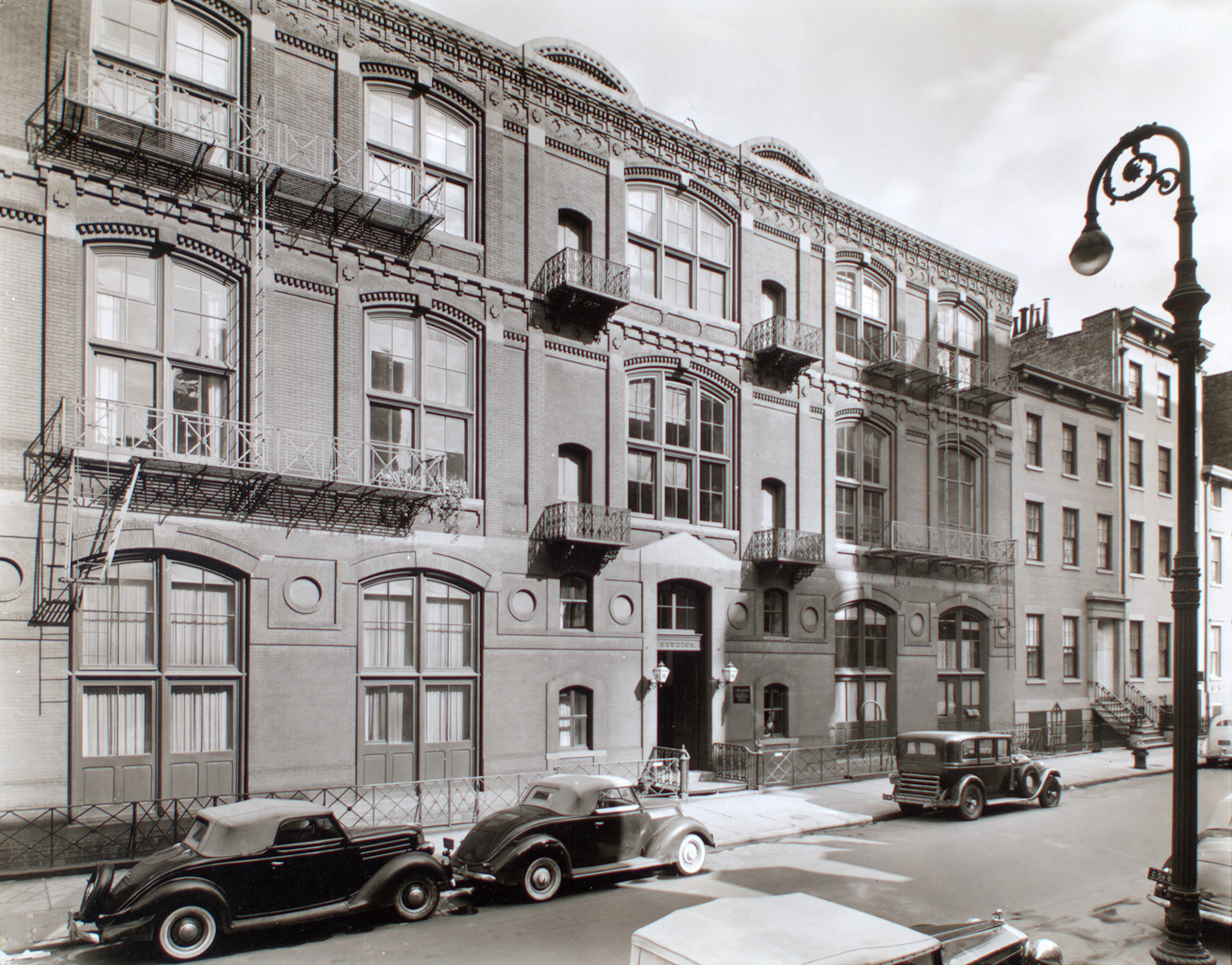
The Tenth Street Studio Building in New York City (photographed 1938)

Gibran sailed back to New York City from Boulogne-sur-Mer on the Nieuw Amsterdam on October 22, 1910, and was back in Boston by November 11. By February 1911, Gibran had joined the Boston branch of a Syrian international organization, the Golden Links Society. (Note: Arabic: الحلقات الذهبية, ALA-LC: al-Ḥalaqāt al-Dhahabiyyah. As worded by Waterfield, "the ostensible purpose of the society was the improvement of life for Syrians all around the world—which included their homeland, where improvement of life could mean taking a stand on Ottoman rule.") He lectured there for several months "in order to promote radicalism in independence and liberty" in Syria from the Ottoman Empire. At the end of April, Gibran was staying in Teller's vacant flat at 164 Waverly Place in New York City. "Gibran settled in, made himself known to his Syrian friends—especially Amin Rihani, who was now living in New York—and began both to look for a suitable studio and to sample the energy of New York." As Teller returned on May 15, he moved to Rihani's small room at 28 West 9th Street. (Note: By June 1, Gibran had introduced Rihani to Teller. A relationship would develop between Rihani and Teller, lasting for a number of months.) Gibran then moved to one of the Tenth Street Studio Building's studios for the summer, before changing to another of its studios (number 30, which had a balcony, on the third story) in fall. Gibran would live there until his death, referring to it as "The Hermitage." Over time, however, and "ostensibly often for reasons of health", he would spend "longer and longer periods away from New York, sometimes months at a time [...], staying either with friends in the countryside or with Marianna in Boston or on the Massachusetts coast." His friendships with Teller and Micheline would wane; the last encounter between Gibran and Teller would occur in September 1912, and Gibran would tell Haskell in 1914 that he now found Micheline "repellent." (Note: Teller married writer Gilbert Julius Hirsch (1886–1926) on October 14, 1912, with whom she lived periodically in New York and in different parts of Europe, dying in 1953. Micheline married a New York City attorney, Lamar Hardy, on October 14, 1914.)

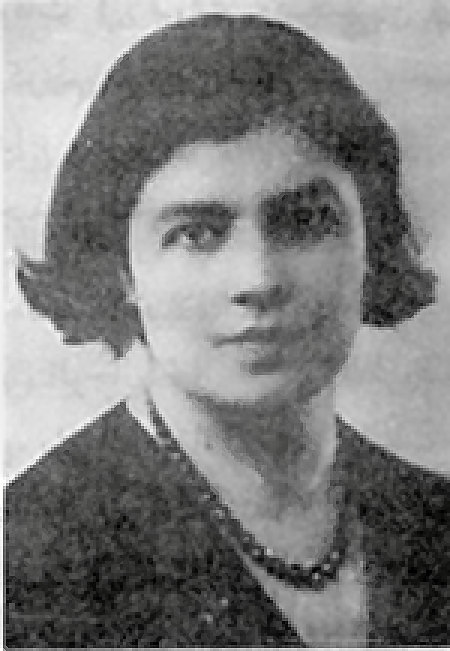
May Ziadeh

In 1912, the poetic novella Broken Wings was published in Arabic by the printing house of the periodical Meraat-ul-Gharb in New York. Gibran presented a copy of his book to Lebanese writer May Ziadeh, who lived in Egypt, and asked her to criticize it. As worded by Ghougassian,

Her reply on May 12, 1912, did not totally approve of Gibran's philosophy of love. Rather she remained in all her correspondence quite critical of a few of Gibran's Westernized ideas. Still he had a strong emotional attachment to Miss Ziadeh till his death.

Gibran and Ziadeh never met. According to Shlomit C. Schuster, "whatever the relationship between Kahlil and May might have been, the letters in A Self-Portrait mainly reveal their literary ties. Ziadeh reviewed all of Gibran's books and Gibran replies to these reviews elegantly."

Poet, who has heard thee but the spirits that follow thy solitary path?
Prophet, who has known thee but those who are driven by the Great Tempest to thy lonely grove?

— To Albert Pinkham Ryder (1915), first two verses

In 1913, Gibran started contributing to Al-Funoon, an Arabic-language magazine that had been recently established by Nasib Arida and Abd al-Masih Haddad. A Tear and a Smile was published in Arabic in 1914. In December of the same year, visual artworks by Gibran were shown at the Montross Gallery, catching the attention of American painter Albert Pinkham Ryder. Gibran wrote him a prose poem in January and would become one of the aged man's last visitors. After Ryder's death in 1917, Gibran's poem would be quoted first by Henry McBride in the latter's posthumous tribute to Ryder, then by newspapers across the country, from which would come the first widespread mention of Gibran's name in America. By March 1915, two of Gibran's poems had also been read at the Poetry Society of America, after which Corinne Roosevelt Robinson, the younger sister of Theodore Roosevelt, stood up and called them "destructive and diabolical stuff"; nevertheless, beginning in 1918 Gibran would become a frequent visitor at Robinson's, also meeting her brother.

=== The Madman, the Pen League, and The Prophet ===
Gibran acted as a secretary of the Syrian–Mount Lebanon Relief Committee, which was formed in June 1916. The same year, Gibran met Lebanese author Mikhail Naimy after Naimy had moved from the University of Washington to New York. Naimy, whom Gibran would nickname "Mischa", had previously made a review of Broken Wings in his article "The Dawn of Hope After the Night of Despair", published in Al-Funoon, and he would become "a close friend and confidant, and later one of Gibran's biographers." In 1917, an exhibition of forty wash drawings was held at Knoedler in New York from January 29 to February 19 and another of thirty such drawings at Doll & Richards, Boston, April 16–28.

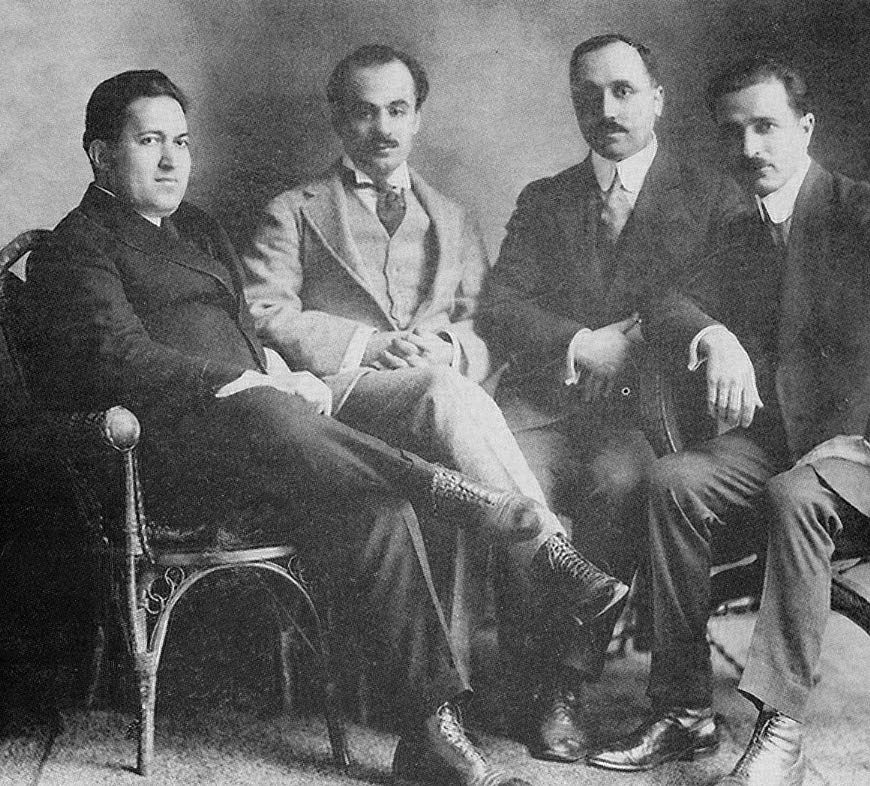
Four members of the Pen League in 1920. Left to right: Nasib Arida, Gibran, Abd al-Masih Haddad, and Mikhail Naimy

While most of Gibran's early writings had been in Arabic, most of his work published after 1918 was in English. Such was The Madman, Gibran's first book published by Alfred A. Knopf in 1918. The Processions (in Arabic) and Twenty Drawings were published the following year. In 1920, Gibran re-created the Arabic-language New York Pen League with Arida and Haddad (its original founders), Rihani, Naimy, and other Mahjari writers such as Elia Abu Madi. The same year, The Tempests was published in Arabic in Cairo, and The Forerunner in New York.

In a letter of 1921 to Naimy, Gibran reported that doctors had told him to "give up all kinds of work and exertion for six months, and do nothing but eat, drink and rest"; in 1922, Gibran was ordered to "stay away from cities and city life" and had rented a cottage near the sea, planning to move there with Marianna and to remain until "this heart [regained] its orderly course"; this three-month summer in Scituate, he later told Haskell, was a refreshing time, during which he wrote some of "the best Arabic poems" he had ever written.

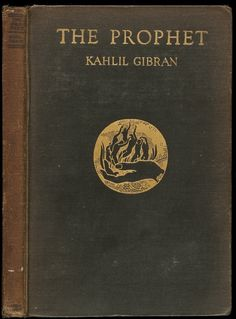
First edition cover of The Prophet (1923)

In 1923, The New and the Marvelous was published in Arabic in Cairo, whereas The Prophet was published in New York. The Prophet sold well despite a cool critical reception. (Note: It would gain popularity in the 1930s and again especially in the 1960s counterculture.) At a reading of The Prophet organized by rector William Norman Guthrie in St. Mark's Church in-the-Bowery, Gibran met poet Barbara Young, who would occasionally work as his secretary from 1925 until Gibran's death; Young did this work without remuneration. In 1924, Gibran told Haskell that he had been contracted to write ten pieces for Al-Hilal in Cairo. In 1925, Gibran participated in the founding of the periodical The New East.

=== Later years and death ===
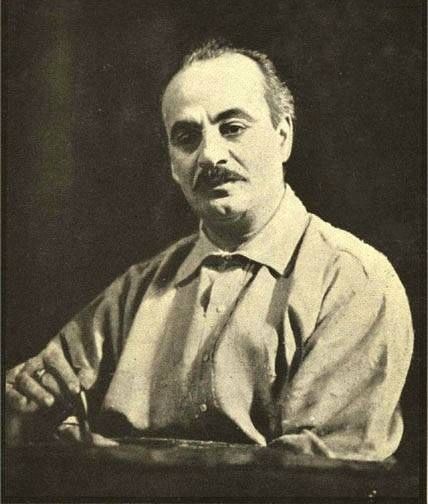
A late photograph of Gibran

Sand and Foam was published in 1926, and Jesus, the Son of Man in 1928. At the beginning of 1929, Gibran was diagnosed with an enlarged liver. In a letter dated March 26, he wrote to Naimy that "the rheumatic pains are gone, and the swelling has turned to something opposite". In a telegram dated the same day, he reported being told by the doctors that he "must not work for full year", which was something he found "more painful than illness." The last book published during Gibran's life was The Earth Gods, on March 14, 1931.

Gibran was admitted to St. Vincent's Hospital, Manhattan, on April 10, 1931, where he died the same day, aged forty-eight, after refusing the last rites. The cause of death was reported to be cirrhosis of the liver with incipient tuberculosis in one of his lungs. Waterfield argues that the cirrhosis was contracted through excessive drinking of alcohol and was the only real cause of Gibran's death.

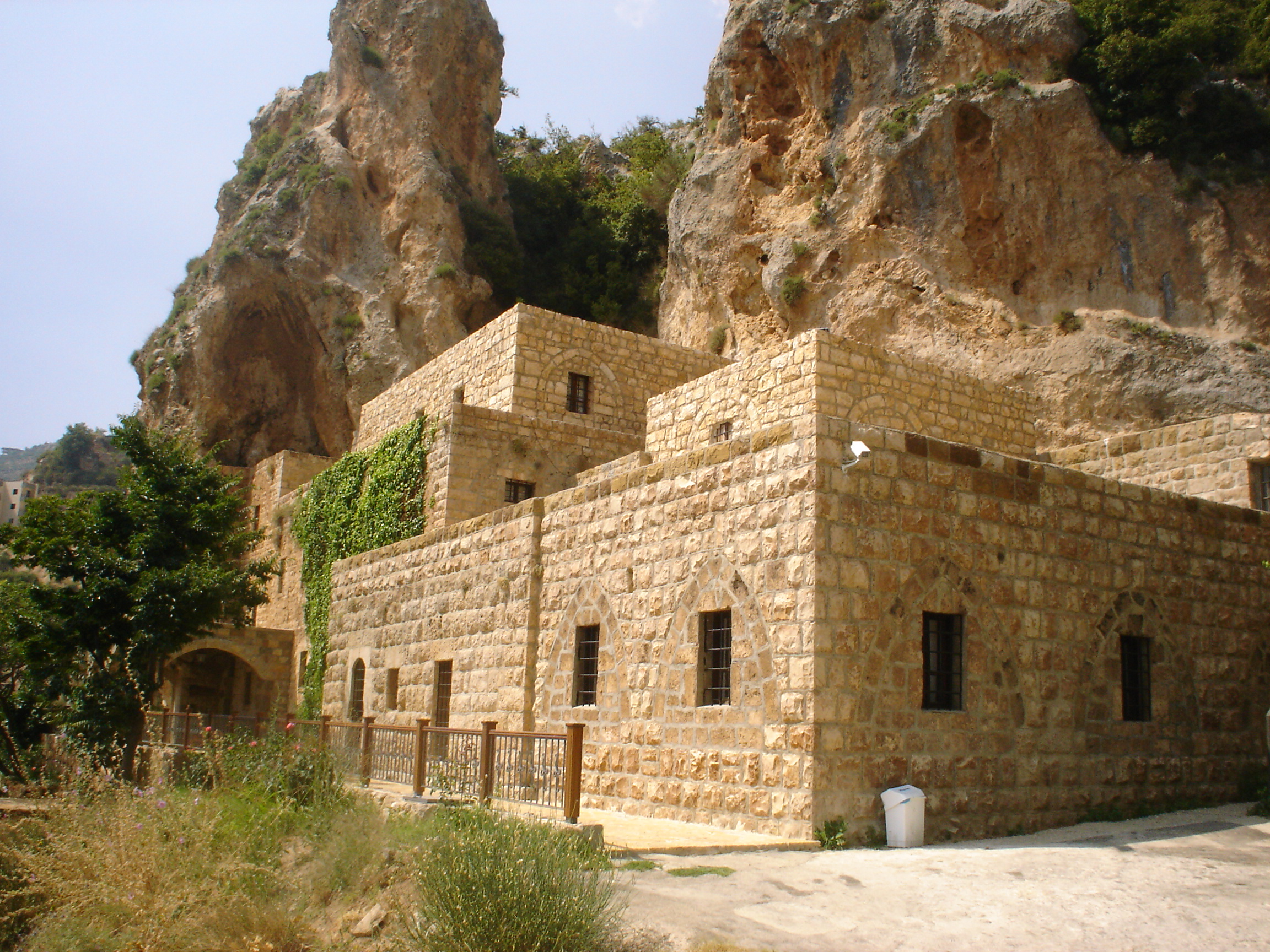
The Gibran Museum and Gibran's final resting place, in Bsharri

"The epitaph I wish to be written on my tomb:
'I am alive, like you. And I now stand beside you. Close your eyes and look around, you will see me in front of you'. Gibran"

— Epitaph at the Gibran Museum

=== Gibran Museum and royalties ===
Gibran had expressed the wish that he be buried in Lebanon. His body lay temporarily at Mount Benedict Cemetery in Boston before it was taken on July 23 to Providence, Rhode Island, and from there to Lebanon on the liner Sinaia. Gibran's body reached Bsharri in August and was deposited in a church near-by until a cousin of Gibran finalized the purchase of the Mar Sarkis Monastery, now the Gibran Museum.

All future American royalties to his books were willed to his hometown of Bsharri, to be used for "civic betterment." Gibran had also willed the contents of his studio to Haskell.

Going through his papers, Young and Haskell discovered that Gibran had kept all of Mary's love letters to him. Young admitted to being stunned at the depth of the relationship, which was all but unknown to her. In her own biography of Gibran, she minimized the relationship and begged Mary Haskell to burn the letters. Mary agreed initially but then reneged, and eventually they were published, along with her journal and Gibran's some three hundred letters to her, in [Virginia] Hilu's Beloved Prophet.

In 1950, Haskell donated her personal collection of nearly one hundred original works of art by Gibran (including five oils) to the Telfair Museum of Art in Savannah, Georgia. Haskell had been thinking of placing her collection at the Telfair as early as 1914. (Note: In a letter to Gibran, she wrote: I am thinking of other museums ... the unique little Telfair Gallery in Savannah, Ga., that Gari Melchers chooses pictures for. There when I was a visiting child, form burst upon my astonished little soul.) Her gift to the Telfair is the largest public collection of Gibran's visual art in the country.

== Works ==
=== Writings ===
==== Forms, themes, and language ====
Gibran explored literary forms as diverse as "poetry, parables, fragments of conversation, short stories, fables, political essays, letters, and aphorisms." Two plays in English and five plays in Arabic were also published posthumously between 1973 and 1993; three unfinished plays written in English towards the end of Gibran's life remain unpublished (The Banshee, The Last Unction, and The Hunchback or the Man Unseen). Gibran discussed "such themes as religion, justice, free will, science, love, happiness, the soul, the body, and death" in his writings, which were "characterized by innovation breaking with forms of the past, by symbolism, an undying love for his native land, and a sentimental, melancholic yet often oratorical style." According to Salma Jayyusi, Roger Allen and others, Gibran as the leading poet of the Mahjar school belongs to Romantic (neo-romantic) movement.

About his language in general (both in Arabic and English), Salma Khadra Jayyusi remarks that "because of the spiritual and universal aspect of his general themes, he seems to have chosen a vocabulary less idiomatic than would normally have been chosen by a modern poet conscious of modernism in language." According to Jean Gibran and Kahlil G. Gibran,

Ignoring much of the traditional vocabulary and form of classical Arabic, he began to develop a style which reflected the ordinary language he had heard as a child in Besharri and to which he was still exposed in the South End [of Boston]. This use of the colloquial was more a product of his isolation than of a specific intent, but it appealed to thousands of Arab immigrants.

The poem "You Have Your Language and I Have Mine" (1924) was published in response to criticism of his Arabic language and style.

==== Influences and antecedents ====
According to Bushrui and Jenkins, an "inexhaustible" source of influence on Gibran was the Bible, especially the King James Version. Gibran's literary oeuvre is also steeped in the Syriac tradition. According to Haskell, Gibran once told her that

The [King James] Bible is Syriac literature in English words. It is the child of a sort of marriage. There's nothing in any other tongue to correspond to the English Bible. And the Chaldo-Syriac is the most beautiful language that man has made—though it is no longer used. (Note: Gibran reportedly once asked Syriac Orthodox Patriarch Ignatius Aphrem I, who was still Archbishop of the Americas, to translate the poems of Ephrem the Syrian as people only deserved to read them.)

As worded by Waterfield, "the parables of the New Testament" affected "his parables and homilies" while "the poetry of some of the Old Testament books" affected "his devotional language and incantational rhythms." Annie Salem Otto notes that Gibran avowedly imitated the style of the Bible, whereas other Arabic authors from his time like Rihani unconsciously imitated the Quran.

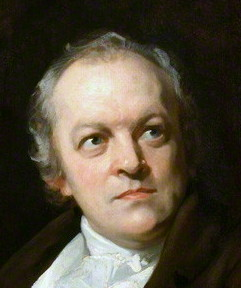
Portrait of William Blake by Thomas Phillips (detail)

According to Ghougassian, the works of English poet William Blake "played a special role in Gibran's life", and in particular "Gibran agreed with Blake's apocalyptic vision of the world as the latter expressed it in his poetry and art." Gibran wrote of Blake as "the God-man", and of his drawings as "so far the profoundest things done in English—and his vision, putting aside his drawings and poems, is the most godly." According to George Nicolas El-Hage,

There is evidence that Gibran knew some of Blake's poetry and was familiar with his drawings during his early years in Boston. However, this knowledge of Blake was neither deep nor complete. Kahlil Gibran was reintroduced to William Blake's poetry and art in Paris, most likely in Auguste Rodin's studio and by Rodin himself [on one of their two encounters in Paris after Gibran had begun his Temple of Art portrait series].

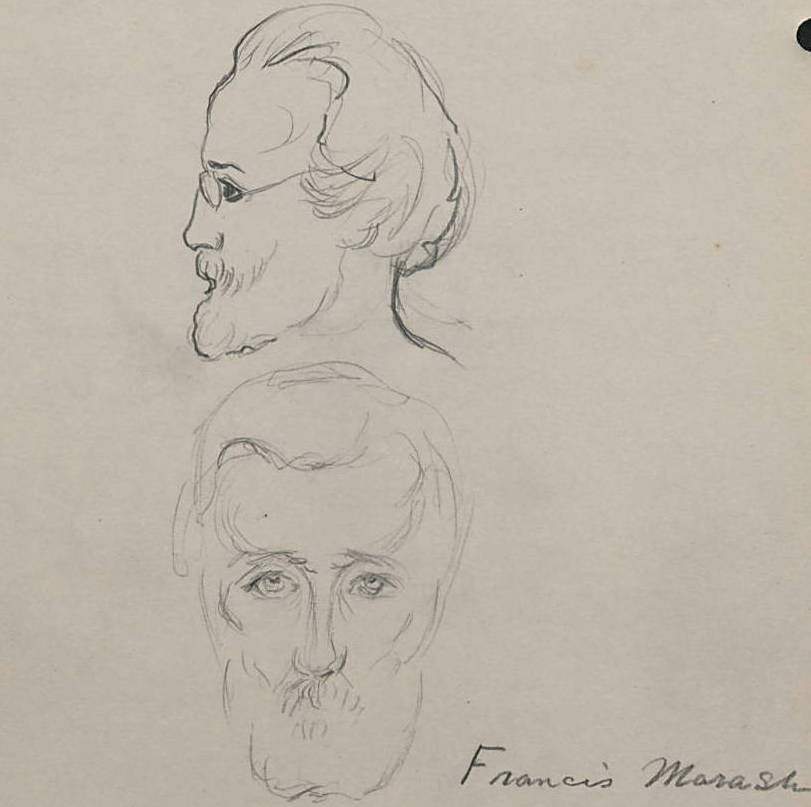
Drawing of Francis Marrash by Gibran, c. 1910

Gibran was also a great admirer of Syrian poet and writer Francis Marrash, whose works Gibran had studied at the Collège de la Sagesse. According to Shmuel Moreh, Gibran's own works echo Marrash's style, including the structure of some of his works and "many of [his] ideas on enslavement, education, women's liberation, truth, the natural goodness of man, and the corrupted morals of society." Bushrui and Jenkins have mentioned Marrash's concept of universal love, in particular, in having left a "profound impression" on Gibran.

Another influence on Gibran was American poet Walt Whitman, whom Gibran followed "by pointing up the universality of all men and by delighting in nature. (Note: Richard E. Hishmeh has drawn comparisons between passages from The Prophet and Whitman's "Song of Myself" and Leaves of Grass.) According to El-Hage, the influence of German philosopher Friedrich Nietzsche "did not appear in Gibran's writings until The Tempests." Nevertheless, although Nietzsche's style "no doubt fascinated" him, Gibran was "not the least under his spell":

The teachings of Almustafa are decisively different from Zarathustra's philosophy and they betray a striking imitation of Jesus, the way Gibran pictured Him.

==== Critics ====
Gibran was neglected by scholars and critics for a long time. Bushrui and John M. Munro have argued that "the failure of serious Western critics to respond to Gibran" resulted from the fact that "his works, though for the most part originally written in English, cannot be comfortably accommodated within the Western literary tradition." According to El-Hage, critics have also "generally failed to understand the poet's conception of imagination and his fluctuating tendencies towards nature."

=== Visual art ===
==== Overview ====
According to Waterfield, "Gibran was confirmed in his aspiration to be a Symbolist painter" after working in Marcel-Béronneau's studio in Paris. Oil paint was Gibran's "preferred medium between 1908 and 1914, but before and after this time he worked primarily with pencil, ink, watercolor and gouache." In a letter to Haskell, Gibran wrote that "among all the English artists Turner is the very greatest." In her diary entry of March 17, 1911, Haskell recorded that Gibran told her he was inspired by J. M. W. Turner's painting The Slave Ship (1840) to utilize "raw colors [...] one over another on the canvas [...] instead of killing them first on the palette" in what would become the painting Rose Sleeves (1911, Telfair Museums).

Gibran created more than seven hundred visual artworks, including the Temple of Art portrait series. His works may be seen at the Gibran Museum in Bsharri; the Telfair Museums in Savannah, Georgia; the Museo Soumaya in Mexico City; Mathaf: Arab Museum of Modern Art in Doha; the Brooklyn Museum and the Metropolitan Museum of Art in New York City; and the Harvard Art Museums. A possible Gibran painting was the subject of a September 2008 episode of the PBS TV series History Detectives.

==== Gallery ====
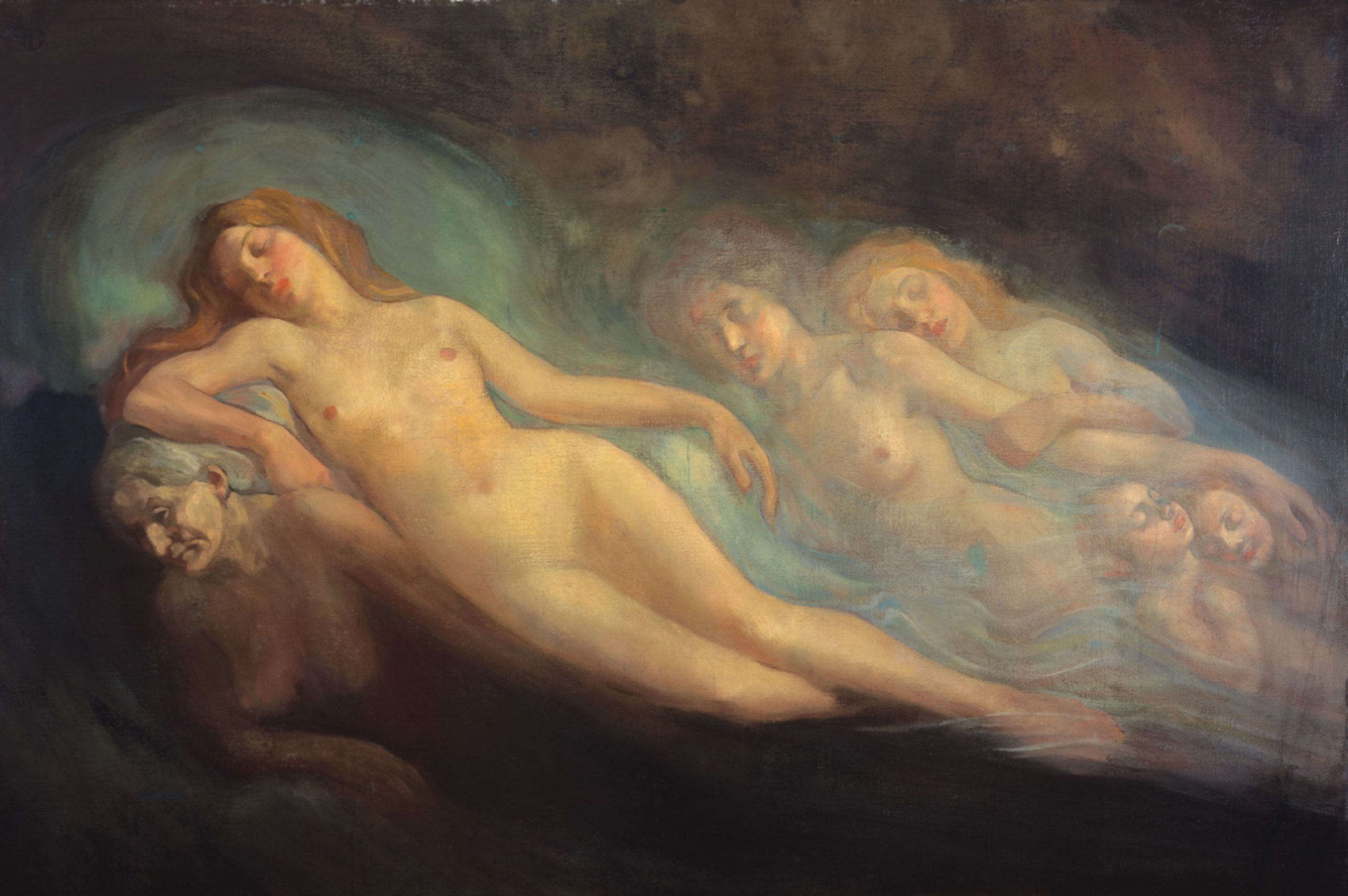
The Ages of Women, 1910 (Museo Soumaya)

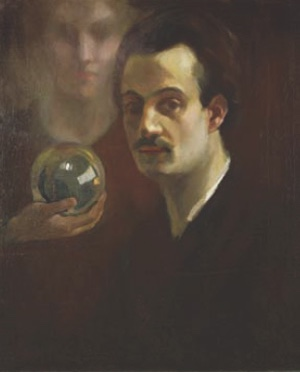
Self-Portrait and Muse, c. 1911 (Museo Soumaya)

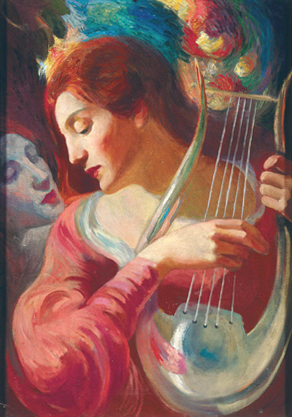
Untitled (Rose Sleeves), 1911 (Telfair Museums)

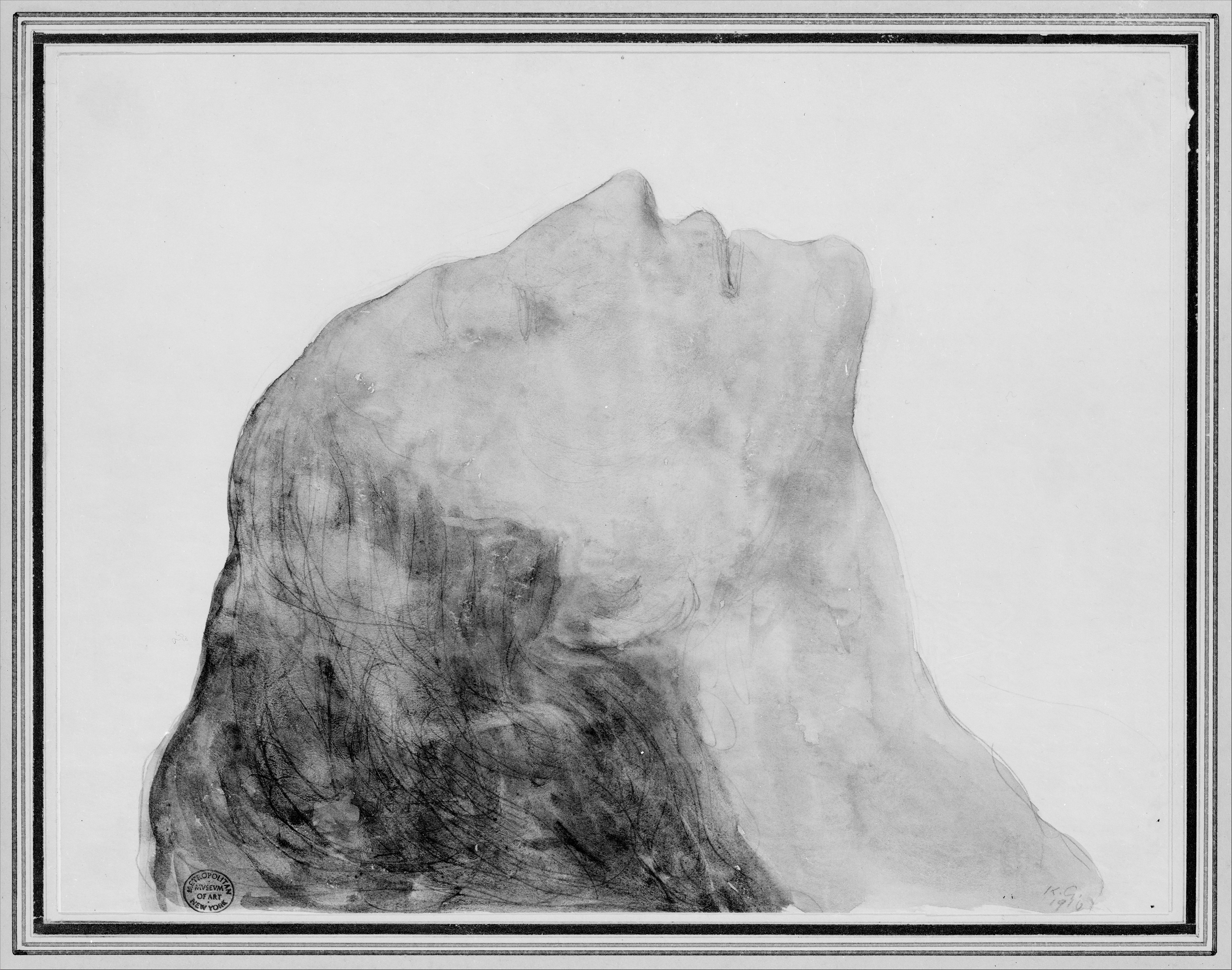
Towards the Infinite (Kamila Gibran, mother of the artist), 1916 (Metropolitan Museum of Arts)

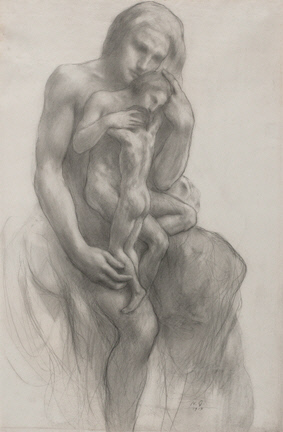
The Three are One, 1918 (Telfair Museums), also The Madman's frontispiece

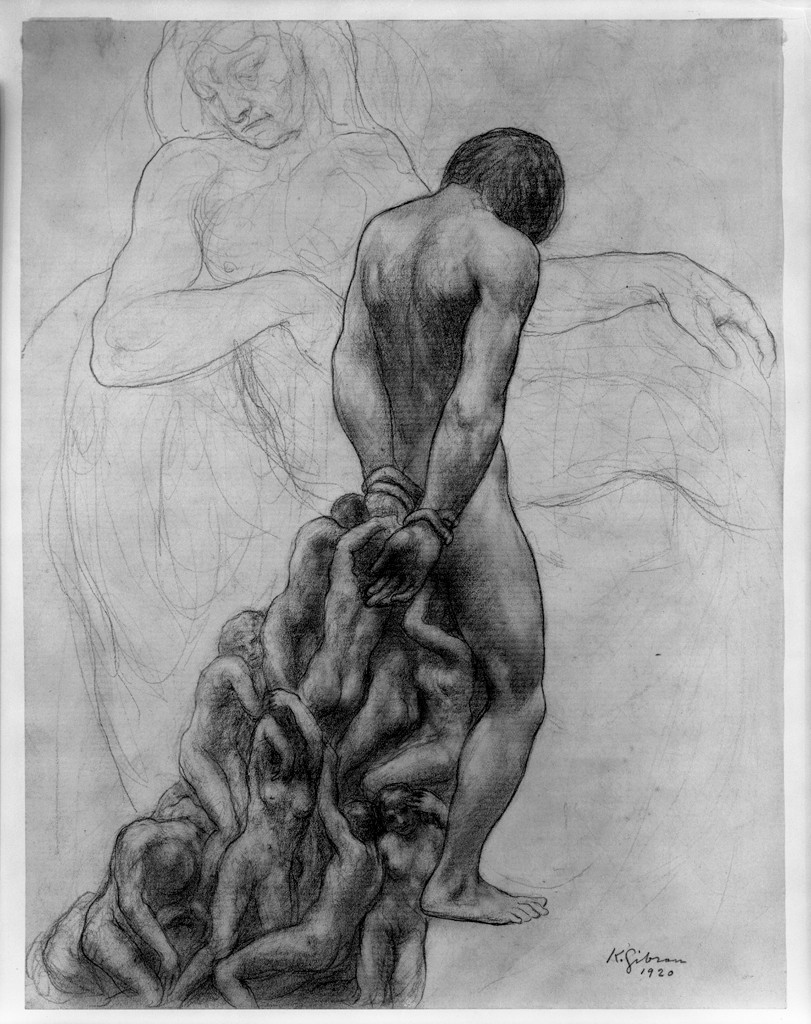
The Slave, 1920 (Harvard Art Museums)

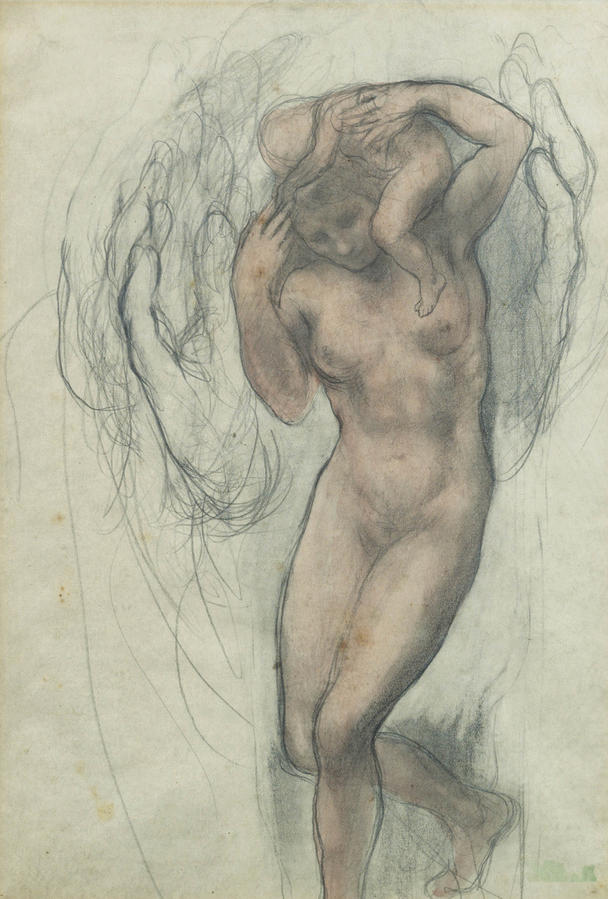
Standing Figure and Child, undated (Barjeel Art Foundation)

== Religious views ==
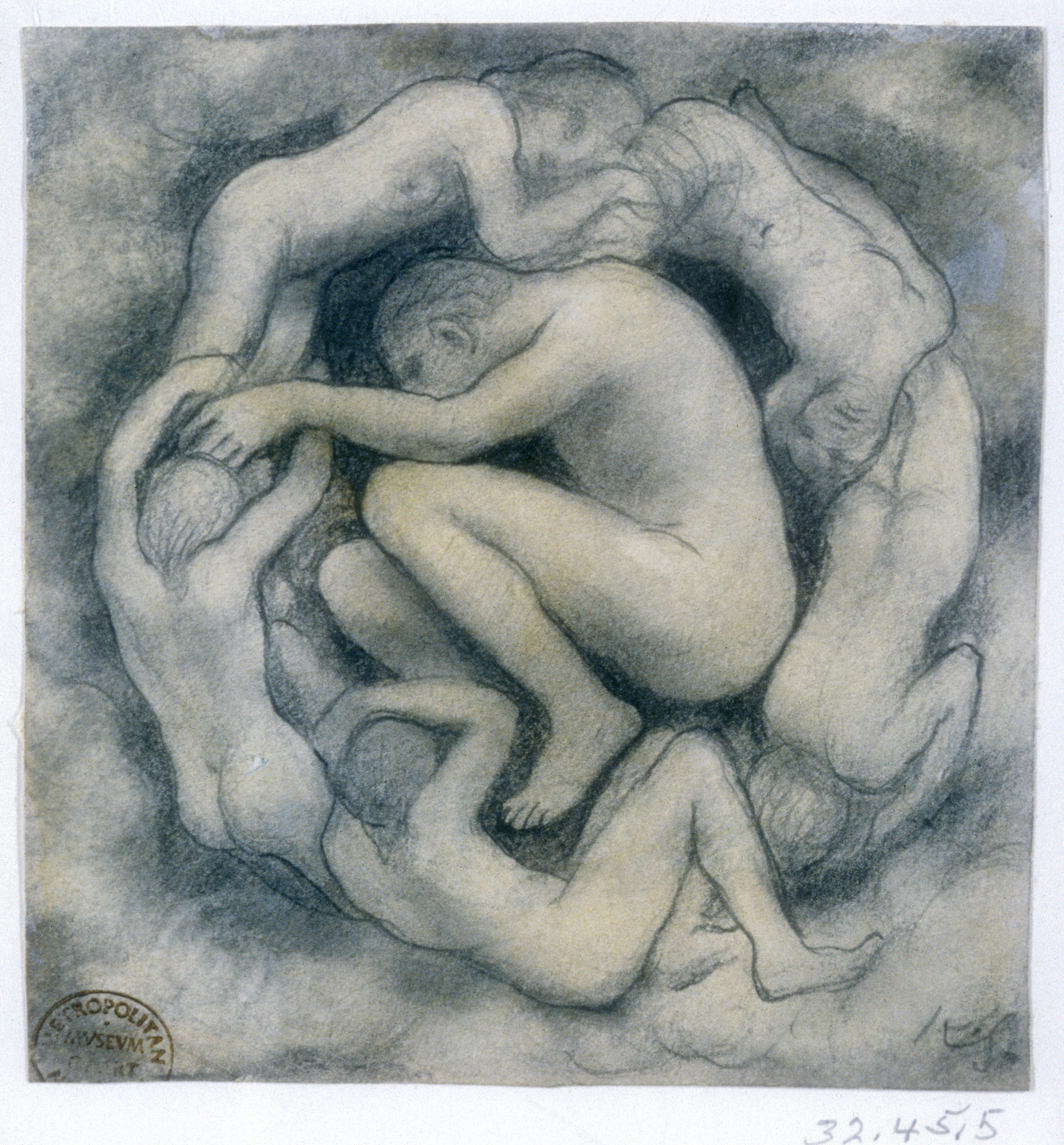
A 1923 sketch by Gibran for his book Jesus the Son of Man (published 1928)

According to Bushrui and Jenkins,

Although brought up as a Maronite Christian, Gibran, as an Arab, was influenced not only by his own religion but also by Islam, especially by the mysticism of the Sufis. His knowledge of Lebanon's bloody history, with its destructive factional struggles, strengthened his belief in the fundamental unity of religions.

Besides Christianity, Islam and Sufism, Gibran's mysticism was also influenced by theosophy and Jungian psychology. In Suheil Bushrui's book The Essential Gibran, the Irish critic, poet, and painter George William Russell wrote that Gibran called himself a 'lifeist', and insistently praised life.

Around 1911–1912, Gibran met with ʻAbdu'l-Bahá, the leader of the Baháʼí Faith who was visiting the United States, to draw his portrait. The meeting made a strong impression on Gibran. One of Gibran's acquaintances later in life, Juliet Thompson, herself a Baháʼí, reported that Gibran was unable to sleep the night before meeting him. This encounter with ʻAbdu'l-Bahá later inspired Gibran to write Jesus the Son of Man that portrays Jesus through the "words of seventy-seven contemporaries who knew him – enemies and friends: Syrians, Romans, Jews, priests, and poets." After the death of ʻAbdu'l-Bahá, Gibran gave a talk on religion with Baháʼís and at another event with a viewing of a movie of ʻAbdu'l-Bahá, Gibran rose to proclaim in tears an exalted station of ʻAbdu'l-Bahá and left the event weeping.

In the poem "The Voice of the Poet" (صوت الشاعر), published in A Tear and a Smile (1914), (Note: Daniela Rodica Firanescu deems probable that the poem was first published in an American Arabic-language magazine.) Gibran wrote:

انت اخي وانا احبك ۔
احبك ساجداً في جامعك وراكعاً في هيكلك ومصلياً في كنيستك ، فأنت وانا ابنا دين واحد هو الروح ، وزعماء فروع هذا الدين اصابع ملتصقة في يد الالوهية المشيرة الى كمال النفس ۔

Translation:

You are my brother and I love you.
I love you when you prostrate yourself in your mosque, and kneel in your church and pray in your synagogue.
You and I are sons of one faith—the Spirit. And those that are set up as heads over its many branches are as fingers on the hand of a divinity that points to the Spirit's perfection.

— Translated by H. M. Nahmad

In 1921, Gibran participated in an "interrogatory" meeting on the question "Do We Need a New World Religion to Unite the Old Religions?" at St. Mark's Church in-the-Bowery.

== Political thought ==
According to Young,

During the last years of Gibran's life there was much pressure put upon him from time to time to return to Lebanon. His countrymen there felt that he would be a great leader for his people if he could be persuaded to accept such a role. He was deeply moved by their desire to have him in their midst, but he knew that to go to Lebanon would be a grave mistake.
"I believe I could be a help to my people," he said. "I could even lead them—but they would not be led. In their anxiety and confusion of mind they look about for some solution to their difficulties. If I went to Lebanon and took the little black book [The Prophet], and said, 'Come let us live in this light,' their enthusiasm for me would immediately evaporate. I am not a politician, and I would not be a politician. No. I cannot fulfill their desire."

When Gibran met ʻAbdu'l-Bahá in 1911–12, who traveled to the United States partly to promote peace, Gibran admired the teachings on peace but argued that "young nations like his own" be freed from Ottoman control. Gibran also wrote his famous poem "Pity the Nation" during these years; it was published posthumously some 20 years later in The Garden of the Prophet. On May 26, 1916, Gibran wrote a letter to Mary Haskell that reads: "The famine in Mount Lebanon has been planned and instigated by the Turkish government. Already 80,000 have succumbed to starvation and thousands are dying every single day. The same process happened with the Christian Armenians and applied to the Christians in Mount Lebanon." Gibran dedicated a poem named "Dead Are My People" to the fallen of the famine.

Gibran called for the adoption of Arabic as a national language of Syria. When the Ottomans were eventually driven from Syria during World War I, Gibran sketched a euphoric drawing "Free Syria", which was then printed on the special edition cover of the Arabic-language paper As-Sayeh (The Traveler; founded 1912 in New York by Haddad). Adel Beshara reports that "in a draft of a play, still kept among his papers, Gibran expressed great hope for national independence and progress. This play, according to Khalil Hawi, 'defines Gibran's belief in Syrian nationalism with great clarity, distinguishing it from both Lebanese and Arab nationalism, and showing us that nationalism lived in his mind, even at this late stage, side by side with internationalism.'" According to Waterfield, Gibran was not "entirely in favour of socialism (which he believed tends to seek the lowest common denominator, rather than bringing out the best in people)".

== Legacy ==
The popularity of The Prophet grew markedly during the 1960s with the American counterculture and then with the flowering of the New Age movements. It has remained popular with these and with the wider population to this day. Since it was first published in 1923, The Prophet has never been out of print. It has been translated into more than 100 languages, making it among the top ten most translated books in history. It was one of the best-selling books of the twentieth century in the United States.

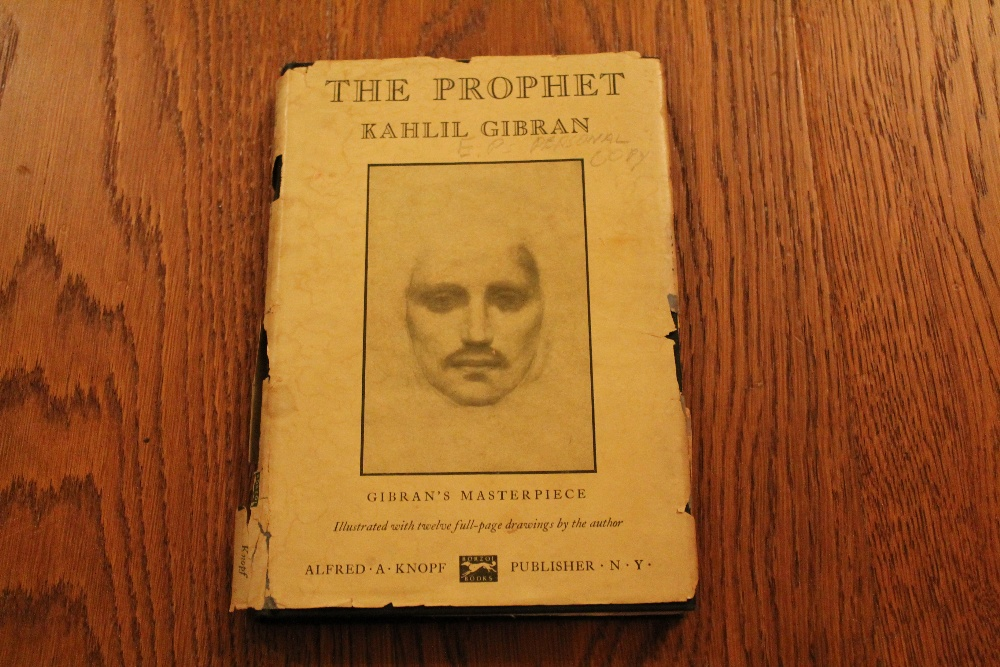
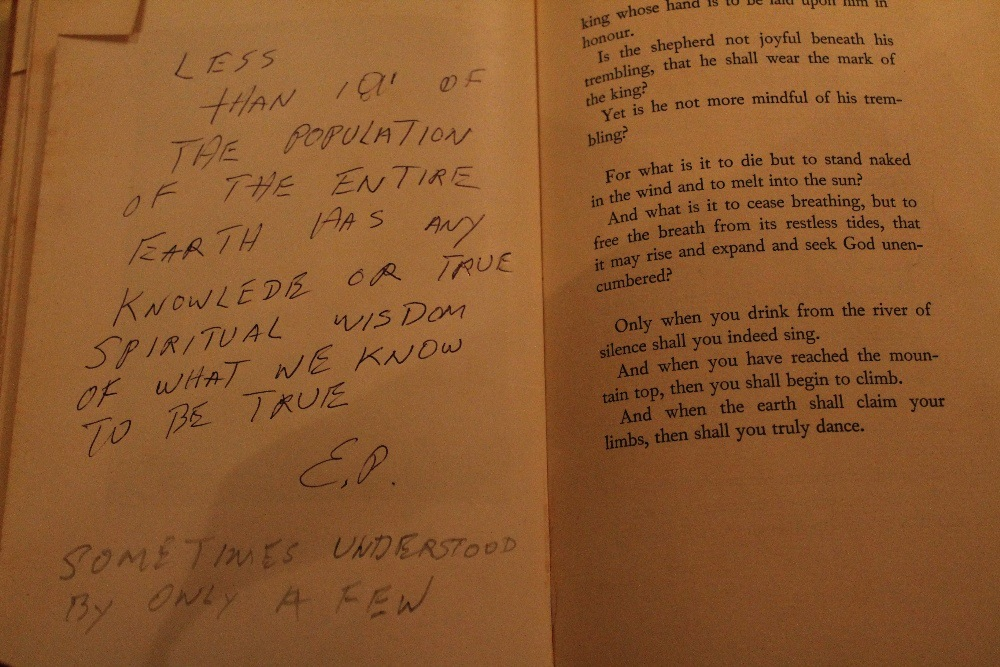
Handwritten notes in Elvis Presley's copy of The Prophet

Elvis Presley referred to Gibran's The Prophet for the rest of his life after receiving his first copy as a gift from his girlfriend June Juanico in July 1956. His marked-up copy still exists in Lebanon and another exists at the Elvis Presley museum in Düsseldorf. A line of poetry from Sand and Foam (1926), which reads "Half of what I say is meaningless, but I say it so that the other half may reach you," was used by John Lennon and placed, though in a slightly altered form, into the song "Julia" from the Beatles' 1968 album The Beatles (a.k.a. "The White Album").

Johnny Cash recorded The Eye of the Prophet as an audio cassette book, and Cash can be heard talking about Gibran's work on a track called "Book Review" on his 2003 album Unearthed. British singer David Bowie mentioned Gibran in the song "The Width of a Circle" from Bowie's 1970 album The Man Who Sold the World. Bowie used Gibran as a "hip reference", because Gibran's work A Tear and a Smile became popular in the hippie counterculture of the 1960s. In 1978 Uruguayan musician Armando Tirelli recorded an album based on The Prophet. In 2016 Gibran's fable "On Death" from The Prophet was composed in Hebrew by Gilad Hochman to the unique setting of soprano, theorbo and percussion, and it premiered in France under the title River of Silence.

Gibran's influence extends far beyond the artistic world. In his 1961 inaugural address, President John F. Kennedy might have drawn inspiration from Gibran's 1925 essay The New Frontier. Echoing Gibran's rhetoric for the newly recreated Lebanon, "Are you a politician asking what your country can do for you or a zealous one asking what you can do for your country?", Kennedy delivered the iconic line "Ask not what your country can do for you – ask what you can do for your country".

His most famous work, The Prophet, was also the target of a collective adaptation as an eponymous film in 2014. Moreover, in 2018, Nadim Naaman and Dana Al Fardan devoted their musical Broken Wings to Kahlil Gibran's novel of the same name. The world premiere was staged in London's Theatre Royal Haymarket.

=== Memorials and honors ===
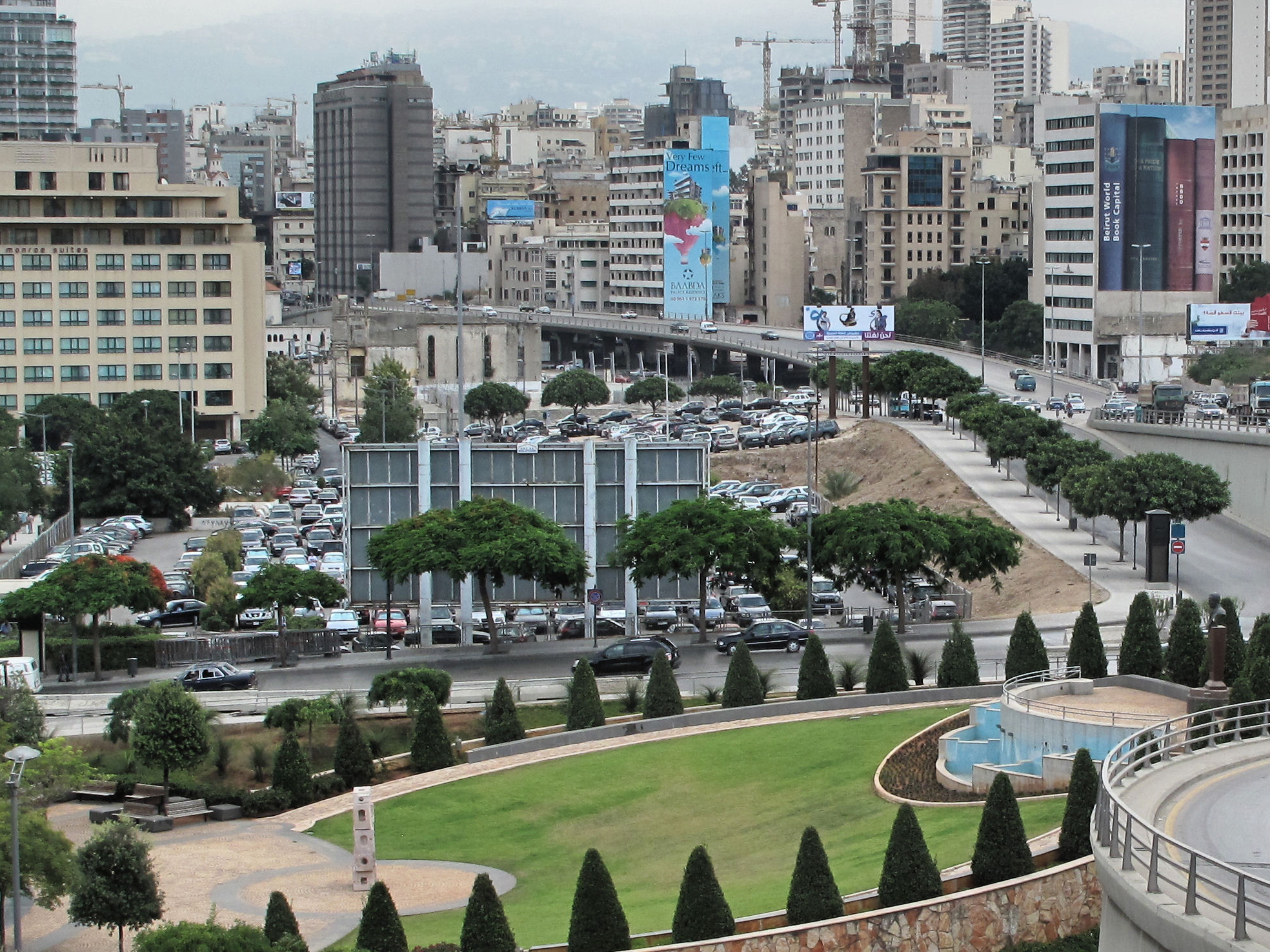
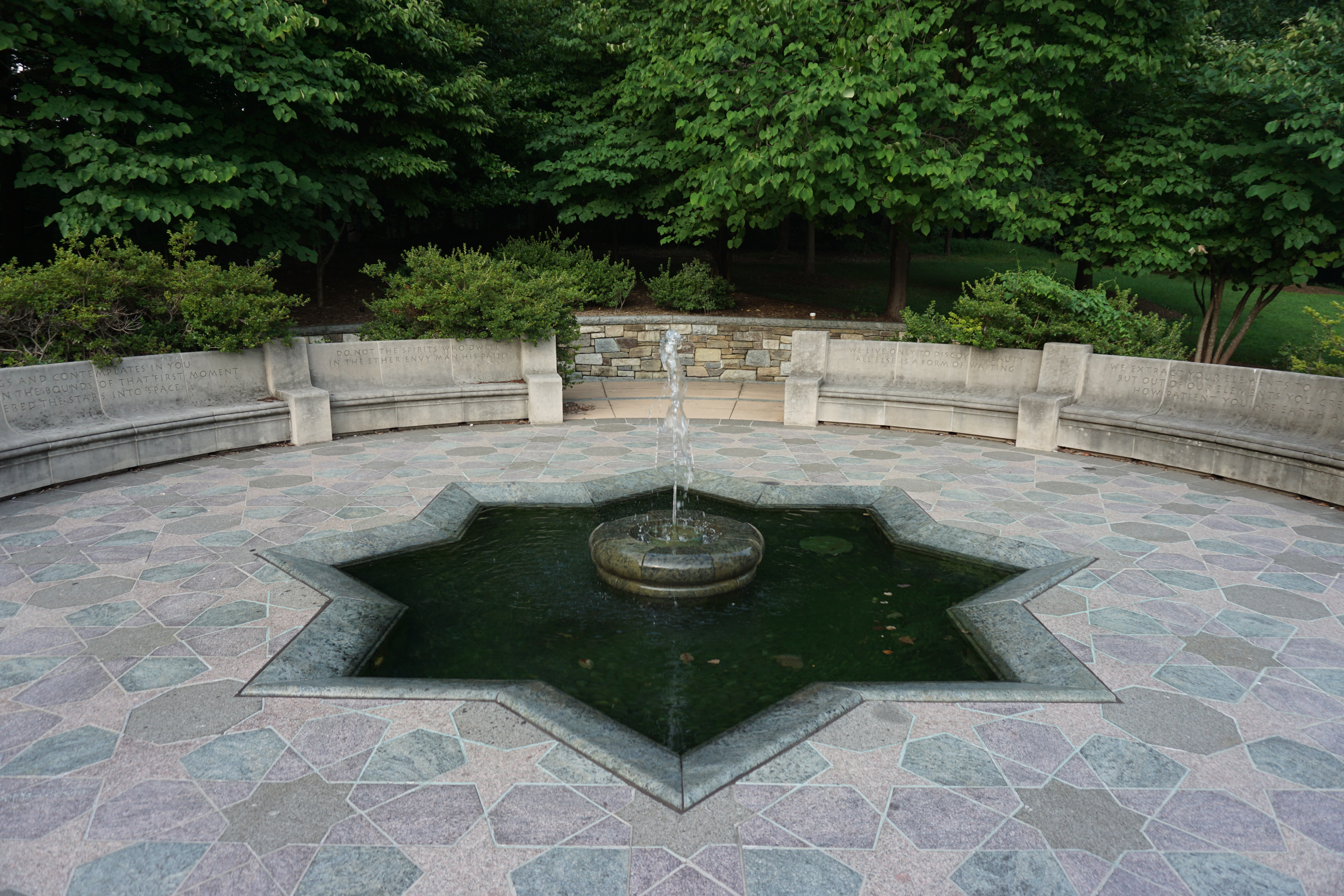
Gibran Khalil Gibran Garden in Beirut (left), and Kahlil Gibran Memorial Garden in Washington, D.C. (right)

A number of places, monuments and educational institutions throughout the world are named in honor of Gibran, including the Gibran Museum in Bsharri, the Gibran Memorial Plaque in Copley Square, Boston, the Gibran Khalil Gibran Garden in Beirut, the Kahlil Gibran Memorial Garden in Washington, D.C., the Khalil Gibran International Academy in Brooklyn, and the Khalil Gibran Elementary School in Yonkers, New York.

A crater on Mercury was named in his honor in 2009.

== Family ==
American sculptor Kahlil G. Gibran (1922–2008) was a cousin of Gibran. The Katter political family in Australia was also related to Gibran. He was described in parliament as a cousin of Bob Katter Sr., originally Khittar, a long-time member of the Australian parliament and one-time Minister for the Army, and through him his son Bob Katter, founder of Katter's Australian Party and former Queensland state minister, and state politician Robbie Katter.

== See also ==
- List of Maronites

== Cited works ==
- Acocella, Joan (December 30, 2007). "Prophet Motive: The Kahlil Gibran phenomenon". The New Yorker.
- Allen, R.M.A. (2012). "Arabic poetry". In Greene, Roland; et al. (eds.). The Princeton Encyclopedia of Poetry and Poetics (4th rev. ed.). Princeton, NJ: Princeton University Press. pp. 65–72. ISBN 978-0-691-15491-6.
- Amirani, Shoku; Hegarty, Stephanie (May 12, 2012). "Kahlil Gibran's The Prophet: Why is it so loved?". BBC News. BBC World Service.
- Arab Information Center (1955), "The Arab world", The Arab World, 1, New York: Arab Information Center, OCLC 1481760
- "Armando Tirelli - El Profeta". Light In The Attic Records. Archived from the original on January 4, 2023.
- Bashshur, Rashid L; McCarus, Ernest Nasseph; Yacoub, A.I., eds. (1963). Contemporary Arabic readers (in Arabic and English). Ann Arbor: Univ. of Michigan Press. OCLC 62023693.
- Bawardi, Hani J. (2014). The Making of Arab Americans: from Syrian Nationalism to U.S. citizenship. Austin, TX: University of Texas Press. doi:10.7560/757486. ISBN 9781477307526. JSTOR 10.7560/757486. OCLC 864366332.
- Heart and Soul, The Man Behind The Prophet. bbc.co.uk (Radio broadcast). London: BBC World Service. May 6, 2012.
- Beshara, Adel (2012). "A Rebel Syrian, Gibran Kahlil Gibran". The Origins of Syrian Nationhood: Histories, Pioneers and Identity. Abingdon, Oxon; New York: Routledge. pp. 143–160. ISBN 9781136724503. OCLC 1058079750.
- "Biography". Gibran National Committee.
- "Broken Wings - The Musical". brokenwingsmusical.com. May 12, 2015.
- Bushrui, Suheil B.; Munro, Jon M., eds. (1970). Kahlil Gibran: Essays and Introductions. Gibran International Festival, May 23–30, 1970. Beirut: Rihani House. OCLC 1136103676.
- Bushrui, Suheil B. (1987). Kahlil Gibran of Lebanon: A Re-Evaluation of the Life and Work of the Author of The Prophet. Gerrards Cross, UK: C. Smythe. ISBN 9780861402793. OCLC 16470732.
- Bushrui, Suheil B.; Jenkins, Joe (1998). Kahlil Gibran, Man and Poet: a New Biography. Oneworld Publications. ISBN 9781851682676. OCLC 893209487.
- Chandler, Paul-Gordon (2017). In Search of a Prophet: A Spiritual Journey with Kahlil Gibran. Lanham, MD, US: Rowman & Littlefield. ISBN 9781538104286. OCLC 992437957.
- Cole, Juan R. I. (2000). "Chronology of his Life". Juan Cole's Khalil Gibran Page – Writings, Paintings, Hotlinks, New Translations. Professor Juan R.I. Cole. Archived from the original on January 19, 2000.
- col1234 (January 3, 2010). "The Width of a Circle". Pushing Ahead of the Dame: The Width of a Circle.
- Corm, Charles (2004) [1934]. Jahshan, Paul (ed.). The sacred mountain. Translated by Goff-Kfouri, Carol-Ann. Louaize, Lebanon: Notre Dame University Press. ISBN 9789953418889. OCLC 54999908.
- Dahdah, Jean-Pierre (1994). Khalil Gibran, une biographie (in French). Albin Michel. ISBN 9782226075512.
- Daoudi, M. S. (1982). The meaning of Kahlil Gibran. Secaucus, NJ: Citadel Press. ISBN 9780806508047. OCLC 1150277275.
- "Definition of Gibran". dictionary.com. September 20, 2012.
- Sherfan, Andrew Dib, ed. (1974). "Ask Not What Your Country Can Do For You". A Third Treasury of Kahlil Gibran. Secaucus, N.J.: Citadel Press. ISBN 978-0-8065-0403-2. OCLC 654736185 – via Internet Archive.
- "Do We Need a New World Religion to Unite the Old Religions?". The Brooklyn Daily Eagle. Brooklyn, NY. March 26, 1921. p. 7 – via Newspapers.com.
- Donovan, Sandra (2011). The Middle Eastern American experience. Minneapolis: Twenty-First Century Books. ISBN 9780761363613. OCLC 667202530.
- El-Hage, George Nicolas (2002). William Blake & Kahlil Gibran : poets of prophetic vision. Louaize, Lebanon: NDU Press. ISBN 9789953418407. OCLC 249027104.
- Farrāj ʻAṭā Sālim (1998). كشاف معجم المؤلفين لكحالة (in Arabic). al-Riyāḍ: Maktabat al-Malik Fahd al-Waṭanīyah. ISBN 978-9960-00-284-2.
- Firanescu, Daniela Rodica (2011). "Renewing thought from exile: Gibran on the New Era" (PDF). Synergies Monde Arabe. 8 (2011): 67–80. ISSN 1766-2796. OCLC 823342904.
- Ghattas, Kim (September 6, 2007). "New York Arabic school sparks row". BBC News.
- Ghazal, Rym (April 14, 2015). "Lebanon's dark days of hunger: The Great Famine of 1915-18". The National.
- Ghougassian, Joseph P (1974). "The Contributions of the Writer". A Third Treasury of Kahlil Gibran. By Sherfan, Andrew Dib; Gibran, Kahlil. Sherfan, Andrew Dib (ed.). Vol. Book Three. Secaucus, NJ: Citadel Press. ISBN 9780806504032. OCLC 654736185, 793493890.
- Ghougassian, Joseph (1973). Kahlil Gibran: Wings of Thought; the people's philosopher. New York: Philosophical Library. ISBN 9780802221155. OCLC 569449532.
- "Gibran: Birth and Childhood". leb.net.
- Gibran, Jean; Gibran, Kahlil (1991) [1970]. Kahlil Gibran: His Life and World. New York: Interlink Books. ISBN 9780940793798. OCLC 988544667.
- Gibran, Jean; Gibran, Kahlil; Hayek, Salma (2017). Kahlil Gibran: Beyond Borders. Northampton, MA, US: Interlink Books. ISBN 9781566560931. OCLC 936349669.
- Gibran, Khalil (October 1916). "Dead Are My People". PoemHunter.com.
- Gibran, Kahlil (1928). Jesus the Son of Man. New York, NY: A.A. Knopf. OCLC 589037866.
- Gibran, Kahlil (1950). Damʻah wa-ibtisāmah (دمعة وابتسامة) [A tear and a smile] (in Arabic). Bayrūt: Maktabat Ṣādir. OCLC 1029000174 – via New York University Libraries, Arabic Collections Online.
- Gibran, Kahlil (1959). Ferris, Anthony R (ed.). Kahlil Gibran : a self-portrait. Translated by Ferris, Anthony R. New York: Citadel Press. OCLC 838375, 1150021694. ISBN 978-0-8065-0108-6
- Gibran, Kahlil (2007). The Collected Works. Alfred A. Knopf. ISBN 9780307267078.
- Haiek, Joseph (2003). Arab-American Almanac (5th ed.). Glendale, CA, US: News Circle Pub. House. ISBN 9780915652211. OCLC 57206425.
- Hajjar, Nijmeh (2010). The Politics and Poetics of Ameen Rihani : the Humanist Ideology of an Arab-American Intellectual and Activist. London: I.B. Tauris & Co. ISBN 9780857718167. OCLC 682882079.
- Hishmeh, Richard E. (2009). "Strategic Genius, Disidentification, and the Burden of The Prophet in Arab-America Poetry". Arab Voices in Diaspora: Critical Perspectives on Anglophone Arab Literature. Amsterdam New York, NY: Rodopi. pp. 93–120. ISBN 9789042027190. OCLC 559994020.
- Hochman, Gilad, composer, and the Sferraina Ensemble (April 10, 2016). River of Silence (Video) (in Hebrew). Archived from the original on November 3, 2021 – via YouTube.
- Jason, Philip (2003). Critical survey of poetry. Vol. v. 3 (2nd rev. ed.). Pasadena, CA, US: Salem Press. ISBN 9781587650741. OCLC 49959198.
- Jayyusi, Salma Khadra; Tingley, Christopher (1977). Trends and Movements in Modern Arabic Poetry. Vol. 1. Leiden: E. J. Brill. ISBN 9789004049208. OCLC 879101909.
- Jayyusi, Salma Khadra (1977). Trends and Movements in Modern Arabic Poetry. Vol. 2. Leiden: E. J. Brill. ISBN 90-04-04920-7.
- Jayyusi, Salma Khadra, ed. (1987). Modern Arabic Poetry, An Anthology. New York: Columbia University Press. ISBN 9780231052733. OCLC 1150851026.
- Jones, Barry (May 8, 1990). "Death of Hon R.C. Katter". Hansard. Parliament of Australia. Archived from the original on May 13, 2014.
- Juni, Anne (2000). Preface. Les Dieux de la Terre [The Gods of the Earth]. By Gibran, Khalil (in French). Translated by Juni, Anne. Cesson-Sévigné (Ille-et-Vilaine): La Part Commune. ISBN 9782844180124. OCLC 408306583.
- "Kahlil Gibran School: About Our School". Yonkers Public Schools. Archived from the original on August 20, 2022.
- Kairouz, Wahib (1995). Gibran in His Museum. Translated by Murr, Alfred. Jounieh, Liban: Bacharia. OCLC 1136110202.
- Kalem, Glen (April 9, 2018). "The Prophet, translated". The Kahlil Gibran Collective.
- Karam, Antun Ghattas (1981). La vie et l'oeuvre litteraire de Gibran Khalil Gibran [The life and literary work of Gibran Khalil Gibran] (in French). Beirut: Dar An-Nahar. OCLC 1012718795.
- Kates, Ariel (September 3, 2019). "Khalil Gibran: An Immigrant Artist on 10th Street". Village Preservation.
- Kautz, William (2012). "Appendix A, II. Intuitively Inspired Writers, [KG] Kahlil Gibran". Story Of Jesus : An Intuitive Anthology. Trafford Publishing. ISBN 9781466918092. OCLC 1152313853.
- Keogh, Pamela Clarke (2004). Elvis Presley: The Man. The Life. The Legend. New York: Atria Books. ISBN 9781439108154. OCLC 908109375.
- Kiraz, George Anton (2019). "4. Bishops Visit… Churches Consecrated (1927–1948)". The Syriac Orthodox in North America (1895–1995): A Short History. Piscataway, NJ: Gorgias Press. doi:10.31826/9781463240387. ISBN 9781463240370. OCLC 1090706190. S2CID 202465604.
- Larangé, Daniel S. (2005). Poétique de la fable chez Khalil Gibran (1883–1931). Les avatars d'un genre littéraire et musical : le maqām [Poetics of the fable by Khalil Gibran (1883–1931). The avatars of a literary and musical genre: the maqām (place)] (in French). Paris: L'Harmattan. ISBN 9782747595001. OCLC 77051946.
- Larangé, Daniel S. (2009). "Modernité de la tradition". In Saillant, Caroline (ed.). Paroles, langues et silences en héritage : essais sur la transmission intergénérationnelle aux XXe et XXIe siècles (in French). Clermont-Ferrand: Presses universitaires Blaise Pascal. pp. 53–68. ISBN 9782845164086. OCLC 470968051.
- Lazkani, Souad (September 28, 2020). "How President Kennedy's Most Famous Quote Was Actually By Gebran Khalil Gebran". 961.
- Majāʻiṣ, Salīm (2004). Antoun Saadeh : a biography. Beirut: Kutub. ISBN 9789953417950. OCLC 57005050.
- McCullough, Hollis (2005). Telfair Museum of Art : collection highlights. Savannah, GA, US: Telfair Museum of Art. ISBN 978-0-933075-04-7. OCLC 60935021.
- Mcharek, Sana (Spring 2006). Kahlil Gibran and other Arab American prophets (PDF) (MS). Tallahassee, FL: Florida State University. OCLC 70005889. Archived from the original (PDF) on March 4, 2009.
- Medici, Francesco (2019). "The Strange Case of Kahlil Gibran and Jubran Khalil Jubran". The Kahlil Gibran Collective.
- Medici, Francesco; Samaha, Charles M. (2019). "The Untold History of the Gibran Museum's Origins: When the Italian Monks Sold the Monastery of Mar Sarkis". The Kahlil Gibran Collective.
- "MERCURY – Gibran". Planetary Names. July 9, 2009.
- Metropolitan Museum of Art. "Sketch for Jesus the Son of Man". metmuseum.org. New York, NY: The Metropolitan Museum of Art.
- Middle East & Islamic Studies. "Khalil Gibran". Middle East & Islamic Studies Collection. Ithaca, NY: Cornell University Library. Archived from the original on May 1, 2017.
- Montross Gallery (1914). Exhibition of pictures by Kahlil Gibran. New York: Montross Gallery. OCLC 82810730.
- Moreh, Shmuel (1976). Modern Arabic Poetry 1800–1970: the Development of its Forms and Themes under the Influence of Western Literature. Leiden: Brill. ISBN 9789004047952. OCLC 2867226.
- Moreh, Shmuel (1988). Studies in Modern Arabic Prose and Poetry. Leiden, NY: Brill. ISBN 9789004083592. OCLC 16225378.
- Moss, Joyce (2004). Middle Eastern Literatures and Their Times. Thomson Gale. ISBN 9780787637316.
- Moussa, Hiba (April 2006). "(Re)Viewing Gibran and The Prophet on Stage". In Saliba-Chalhoub, Nicole; Chraim, Joseph Michel; Université Saint-Esprit. Faculté des lettres; Comité national Gibran (eds.). Gibran K. Gibran: pionnier de la renaissance à venir [Gibran K. Gibran: pioneer of the Renaissance to come] (in French, Arabic, and English). Kaslik, Lebanon: Holy Spirit University of Kaslik. OCLC 793156631.
- Naimy, Mikhail (1985a). Kahlil Gibran : a biography. New York: Philosophical Library. ISBN 9780802224859. OCLC 12812469.
- Naimy, Nadeem (1985b). The Lebanese prophets of New York. Beirut, Lebanon: American University of Beirut. ISBN 9780815660736. OCLC 13391040.
- Najem, Tom; Amore, Roy C. (2021). Historical Dictionary of Lebanon. Rowman & Littlefield Publishers. doi:10.5771/9781538120446. ISBN 978-1-5381-2044-6. OCLC 1224044919.
- Najjar, Alexandre (2008). Kahlil Gibran: author of the Prophet. Translated by Azkoul, Rae. London; San Francisco: Saqi. ISBN 9780863566684. OCLC 1200483935.
- Najjar, Nada (1999). The space in-between: the ambivalence of early Arab-American writers (PhD). Szuberla, Guy, advisor. Toledo, OH: University of Toledo. OCLC 44099499.
- Oakar, Mary Rose (September 24, 1984). "Kahlil Gibran Memorial". United States Congressional Serial Set. 98th Congress — 2d Session (Report 98-1051). Washington, DC: U.S. Government Printing Office: 1–3. ISSN 1931-2822. OCLC 858053541.
- Otto, Annie Salem (1963). "The Parables of Kahlil Gibran: an interpretation of his writings and his art". New York: Citadel Press. OCLC 646955549.
- Otto, Annie Salem, ed. (1965). The art of Kahlil Gibran. Port Arthur, TX: Hinds. OCLC 2679501.
- Otto, Annie Salem, ed. (1970). The Letters of Kahlil Gibran and Mary Haskell. Houston: A.S. Otto. OCLC 106879.
- Oweis, Fayeq (2008). "Gibran Khalil (Kahlil) Gibran (1883–1931), Poet, Philosopher, and Painter". Encyclopedia of Arab American artists. Westport, CT, US: Greenwood Press. pp. 134–137. ISBN 9780313070310. OCLC 191846368.
- ""Pity The Nation" by Khalil Gibran". artsyhands.com. November 6, 2009. Archived from the original on January 5, 2010.
- Rahimi, Abdolah; Samadi, Rooholah (July 11, 2013). "Descriptive study on Gibran Khalil Gibrans' Point of view about Religion and Religious Thought". European Online Journal of Natural and Social Sciences. 2 (2s). ISSN 1805-3602.
- Raphel, Adrienne (March 17, 2016). "Governing Rhetoric". The Poetry Foundation.
- Reed, Alma (1956). Orozco. New York: Oxford University Press.
- Rosenzweig, Linda (1999). ""The Most Straining of All Experiences", Friendship with Men after 1900". Another self : middle-class American women and their friends in the twentieth century. New York: New York University Press. ISBN 9780814774861. OCLC 52714973.
- Russell (AE), George (2007). "Gibran: The Poet". In Bushrui, Suheil B. (ed.). The Essential Gibran. Oxford: Oneworld. ISBN 978-1-282-09267-9. OCLC 666931442.
- Ryan, Michael; Shengold, Nina (1994). Brink, Nicolette J (ed.). Michael Ryan: Between Living and Dreaming, 1982–1994. Zwolle: Waanders. ISBN 9789066303874. OCLC 906662465.
- Schuster, Shlomit C. (2003). "Kahlil Gibran: A Self-portrait". The Philosopher's Autobiography: A Qualitative Study. Westport, CT, US: Praeger. ISBN 9780313013287. OCLC 52925492.
- "Ship manifest, Saint Paul, arriving at New York". The Statue of Liberty & Ellis Island. May 10, 1902.
- ""The Prophet," by Lebanese-American poet-philosopher Kahlil Gibran, is published". HISTORY. April 20, 2022.
- Tillery, Gary (2013). The Seeker King: A Spiritual Biography of Elvis Presley. Wheaton, IL, US: Quest Books. ISBN 9780835621229. OCLC 868956543.
- Thompson, Juliet (1978). "Juliet Remembers Gibran as told to Marzieh Gail". World Order. 12 (4): 29–31. ISSN 0043-8804. OCLC 1716399.
- Turner, Sheila (March 13, 1971). "Tales of a Levantine Guru". Saturday Review. 54. ISSN 0036-4983. OCLC 1588490, 563914761.
- "View Bahai film". The Brooklyn Daily Eagle. Brooklyn, New York. March 3, 1928. p. 3 – via Newspapers.com.
- Wakim, Joseph (December 28, 2011). "Lesson in sage lines borrowed by Kennedy". The Sydney Morning Herald.
- Waldbridge, John (January 1998). "Gibran, his Aesthetic, and his Moral Universe". Juan Cole's Kahlil Gibran Page – Writings, Paintings, Hotlinks, New Translations. Professor Juan R.I. Cole. Archived from the original on April 22, 2001.
- Waterfield, Robin (1998). Prophet: The Life and Times of Kahlil Gibran. New York: St. Martin's Press. ISBN 9780312193195. OCLC 1036791274.
- Young, Barbara (1945). This Man from Lebanon: A Study of Kahlil Gibran. New York: Alfred A. Knopf. OCLC 609555101.
