= Suheil Bushrui =

Lebanese-American professor (1929–2015)

Professor Suheil Badi Bushrui
- Born: 14 September 1929; Nazareth, Mandatory Palestine
- Died: 2 September 2015 (aged 85); Dayton, Ohio, U.S.
- Citizenship: Lebanon, United States
- Occupation: Literary critic
- Known for: his academic articles and books about Anglo-Irish literature and the Lebanese American artist and poet Gibran Kahlil Gibran

Academic background
- Education: University of Southampton
- Thesis: [ Yeats's verse-plays: the revisions 1900 - 1910] (1965)

Academic work
- Main interests: The Irish poet W. B. Yeats and the Lebanese-American artist and poet Gibran Kahlil Gibran

Suheil Badi Bushrui (Arabic: سهيل بديع بشروئي; September 14, 1929 – September 2, 2015) was a Palestinian professor, author, poet, critic, translator, and peace maker. He was a prominent scholar in regard to the life and works of the Lebanese-American author and poet Kahlil Gibran.

Professor Suheil Badi Bushrui was a distinguished scholar, renowned for his contributions through his books, lectures and academic papers about the Irish poets W. B. Yeats, James Joyce, and other Irish literary figures, such as John Millington Synge. As for the Irish poet, W. B. Yeats, Professor Bushrui has done a lot to bring Yeats's poetry to the Arab-speaking audience, through his translations to Arabic. Professor Bushrui was unique in that he was the first non-westerner to attend the Summer School in Sligo, Ireland, which opened in 1960, dedicated and named after Yeats, who grew up there and also spent his childhood holidays in Sligo's landscape. In accordance with this, Professor Bushrui wrote in 1962 his Ph.D. thesis in English Literature, about Yeats's Plays, The Revisions, 1900 - 1910, during his doctoral studies at Southampton University, England, UK.

== Childhood and early life ==
Suheil Bushrui was born in Nazareth in 1929. He attended the St. George's School in Jerusalem.

== Career and accomplishments ==
Suheil Bushrui was the first Arab national to be appointed to the Chair of English at the American University of Beirut, a position he held from 1968 to 1986. He taught at universities in Africa, Europe, the Middle East, and America. He authored in both English and Arabic tens of books and scholarly articles on themes that ranged from literature to religion to world order. He was the first non-Westerner to be appointed as Chair of the International Association of the Study of Irish Literature.

Later in 1992, he became the first incumbent of the Baháʼí Chair for World Peace at the University of Maryland where he worked on developing alternatives to violent resolution of conflict, exploring spiritual solutions for the various global and social problems.

In his 2007 book The Essential Gibran, Bushrui wrote that Lebanese-American writer, Khalil Gibran (1883–1931) called himself a 'lifeist', and insistently praised life.

Subsequently and until early 2015, Bushrui became the Director of the Kahlil Gibran Chair for Values and Peace at the University of Maryland and was Senior Scholar of Peace Studies at the Center for International Development and Conflict Management.

Throughout his long career, he worked with generations of young people to promote a culture of peace. He was recognized in the many countries in which he taught (Sudan, Nigeria, the U.K., Canada, Lebanon and the U.S.), for the transformation he brought about in the lives of his students.

== Accolades and honors ==
Throughout a long career, professor Bushrui received numerous accolades and honors, including:

- The Lebanese National Order of Merit.
- London University's Una Ellis-Fermor Literary Prize.
- The Silver Medal of Merit of the Vatican-sponsored Sacred and Military Constantinian Order of St. George.
- The University of Maryland's Outstanding Faculty Award.
- A Maryland Governor's Citation for excellence in education.
- The Life Achievement Award of the Alumni Association of the American University of Beirut.
- The Temple of Understanding's Juliet Hollister Award for exceptional service to interfaith understanding.

== Bibliography ==
Books authored (small selection):

- Kahlil Gibran of Lebanon. A re-evaluation of the life and works of the author of The Prophet (1987)
- The Love Letters of Kahlil Gibran to May Ziadah
- The Literary Heritage of the Arabs
- The Wisdom of the Arabs
- The World's Favourite Love Poems
- “Kahlil Gibran: Man and Poet” (with Joe Jenkins)
- "The Spiritual Heritage of the Human Race"
- “Speeches and Articles 1968-2012: His Royal Highness The Prince of Wales” (ed. with David Cadman)
- Bushrui, Suheil (1995). The Style of the Kitáb-i-Aqdas - Aspects of the Sublime. College Park, Maryland, USA: University Press of Maryland. ISBN 1-883053-08-0. OL 1114213M.
- “Desert Songs of the Night: 1500 Years of Arab Literature” (Saqi Books, 2015)
