= Mary Haskell (educator) =

American educator

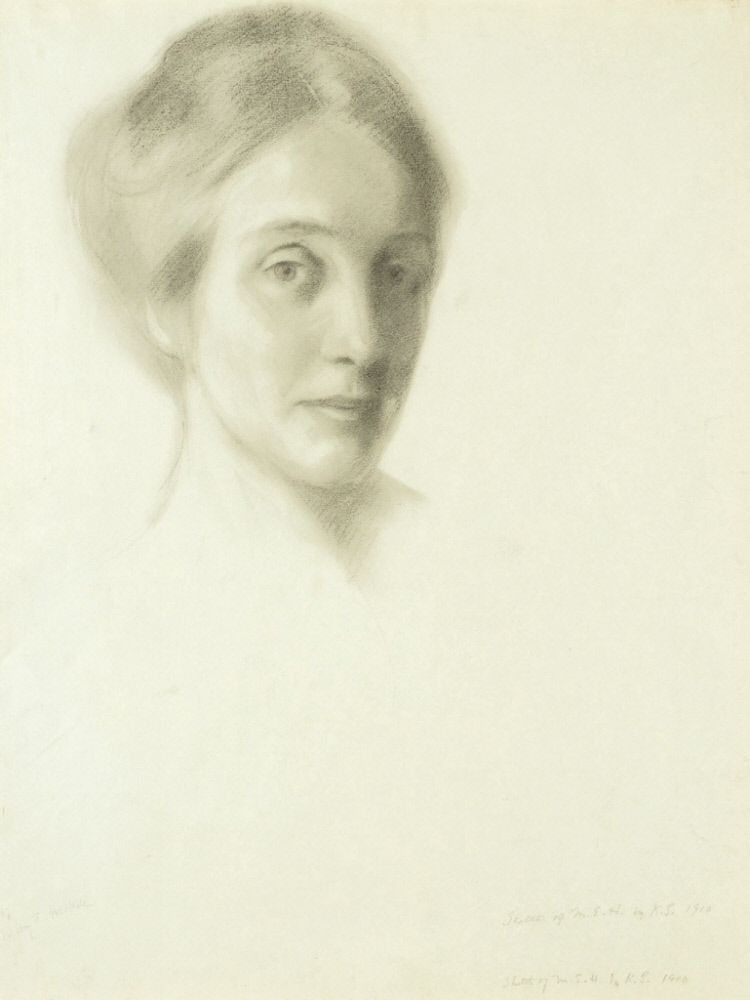
- Kahlil Gibran, Portrait of Mary Haskell, 1910 (Telfair Museums)
- Born: Mary Elizabeth Haskell; December 11, 1873; Columbia, South Carolina
- Died: October 9, 1964 (aged 90)
- Resting place: Laurel Grove Cemetery (North), Savannah, Georgia
- Spouse: Jacob Florance Minis (m. 1926; died 1936)

Mary Elizabeth Haskell, later Minis (December 11, 1873 – October 9, 1964), was an American educator, best known for having been the benefactress of Lebanese-American writer, poet and visual artist Kahlil Gibran.

== Life ==
Haskell was born in Columbia, South Carolina, to Alexander Cheves Haskell and his second wife Alice Van Yeveren (Alexander, sister of Edward Porter Alexander). She was educated at the Presbyterian College for women, Columbia, South Carolina, and Wellesley College, Massachusetts, A.B., 1897.

She was the principal of a private school for girls in Boston, known as Miss Haskell's School for Girls. She taught there, along with her elder sister Louise Porter Haskell. In 1918, the school merged with The Cambridge School of Weston.

On May 7, 1926, she married Jacob Florance Minis (1852–1936), whose first wife had died in 1921.

== Relationship with Kahlil Gibran ==
In 1904, she met Kahlil Gibran at an exhibition of his work at Fred Holland Day's studio, where she had offered to let him display his work at her institution. This interaction began what would come to be a lifelong friendship between Haskell and Gibran. She is known to have funded his artistic endeavors and edited his English writings. There is contention among biographers as to possible romantic dynamics between the two. Some assert that they were never romantically involved, while others assert they were, but that Haskell's family opposed the relationship. Between 1910 and 1911, Gibran proposed to Haskell, and they were briefly engaged. In a book by Joseph P. Ghougassian, Gibran was said to have "offered to marry her" in order to "repay back in gratitude to Miss Haskell," even "though the idea in his mind was despicable." Haskell broke off the engagement, claiming she preferred him as a friend, rather than spouse. She continued to be his patron and friend.

Haskell financed Kahlil Gibran's trip to Paris, allowing for his studies at the Académie Julian and the École des Beaux-Arts. As an act of appreciation for Haskell's support and friendship, Gibran dedicated several of his writings to her memory.

== Sources ==
- Hillhouse, Margaret Prouty (1924). Historical and Genealogical Collections Relating to the Descendants of Rev. James Hillhouse.
