= Modern Arabic literature =

Literature in Arabic since the late 19th century

The instance that marked the shift in Arabic literature towards modern Arabic literature can be attributed to the contact between Arab world and the West during the 19th and early 20th century. This contact resulted in the gradual replacement of Classical Arabic forms with Western ones. Genres like plays, novels, and short stories were coming to the fore. Although the exact date in which this reformation in literary production occurred is unknown, the rise of modern Arabic literature was "inseparable" from the Nahda, also referred to as the Arab Renaissance.

Aleppine writer Qustaki al-Himsi (1858–1941) is credited with having founded modern Arabic literary criticism, with one of his works, The researcher's source in the science of criticism.

== Context ==
The development that Arabic Literature witnessed by the end of the 19th century was not merely in the form of reformation; for both maronite Germanos Farhat (died 1732) and al-Allusi in Iraq had previously attempted to inflict some change on Arabic literature in the 18th century. On the other hand, modern Arabic literature fully appeared through the interdependence between two important movements: the revival of the classical Arabic tradition and the translation of foreign literature. Advocates of the former movement began their work at the onset of the 19th century to resist the decline Arabic literature and its styles were facing.

High quality traditional literary models were thus disseminated and imitated to create new literary models. Meanwhile, proponents of the translation movement included an array of authors such as Nasif al-Yaziji (1800–1871) from Lebanon, Ali Mubarak (born 1823 or 1824; died 1893) from Egypt, and Mahmoud Shukri al-Alusi (died 1923) from Iraq. Both Mubarak and al-Yaziji wrote the maqamat (lengthy literary works of rhymed prose) Alam Eddin and Majma' al-Bahrain (Where Two Seas Meet) respectively, while al-Alusi authored Balaghat al-Arab (The Eloquence of the Arabs). Other factors, including journalism and the literature of the diaspora, helped in shaping and developing Arabic literature.

=== Translations ===
The translation movement began on the hands of Governor Muhammad Ali of Egypt while forming his army. He fostered the endeavor by importing the first printer in 1828 to Egypt (the second printer was brought later to Syria). Among the most prominent translators during that period was Rifa'a al-Tahtawi (1801–1873), who translated many scientific books for the army's use. Al-Tahtawi's influence is mostly recognized, however, in Talkhis al-Ibriz (Paris's Profile), in which he documented his visit to Paris. This book, written in a modern style, is an account of the political and social conditions in France during that time as perceived by the author. Al-Tahtawi was also the first translator of a literary novel, Les Aventures de Télémaque by French writer François Fénelon, into Arabic. However, the mark al-Tahtawi left on the literary reformation was witnessed later via his various contributions.

Most of the early novels to have been translated into Arabic were of French origins. Famous works including Alexandre Dumas's Le Comte de Monte Cristo, Jules Verne's Cinq Semaines en Ballon, and many others from different genres, were readily translated and Arabized and found a large readership through their circulation in journals.

Schools that were established in Beirut and Tunisia for authorship and translation affected, and were in turn influenced by, the direct impact of missionaries in Lebanon. These Lebanese missionaries were led by Ahmad Faris al-Shidyaq (born 1805 or 1806; died 1887), Butrus al-Bustani (1819–1883), Ibrahim al-Yaziji (1847–1906), and, from Tunisia, Mohamed Bayram V (1840–1889). All of these missionaries helped in the creation of Arabic journalism, which was the main force (second to the revival of traditional Arabic literature and the translation movement) in initiating the new literary movement. In Egypt, journalism, first aided by intellectuals from the Levant, and later becoming a genuine Egyptian endeavor, was considered the pivotal ingredient that polished new literary styles and helped in the dissemination of ideas and opinions. Such was the natural and organic atmosphere for the development of modern Arabic literature.

The translation movement also revived on the hands of the literary figures of the New York Pen League. Although the Pen's translation did not directly affect the development of modern literature (unlike the translations of al-Manfaluti and Othman Jalal); translation, as that undertaken during Ibn al-Muqaffa' and al-Jahiz's time, did, nevertheless, help in finding the true literary essence in both Arabic and foreign literature. Without translation, regardless of its quality, modern Arabic literature would not have reached different horizons.

Translation also influenced the Arabic repertoire of imageries and ideas. Most importantly, it introduced new literary genres, such as novels, plays, short stories, articles, etc. The first effect of translation was in the adaptations of foreign plays. It began with Maroun al-Naqqash's (died 1855) adaptation of Molière, and Najib Haddad's (died 1866) translations of Pierre Corneille, Victor Hugo, Alexandre Dumas, and William Shakespeare. However, the most successful attempts in the adaptations of foreign dramas were on the hands of Muhammad Othman Jalal (died 1898), who adapted from Molière, and Arabized the novel Paul et Virginie. Despite all these efforts, the play, as a distinct literary genre, did not reach its full popularity until the 20th century.

=== Journalism ===
In the final thirty years of the 19th century, the growth of journalism helped in the emergence of notable figures in literature. It also created a comprehensive image of the stages of the development of the literary prose genres-excluding poetry- until World War I. On the pages of newspapers and journals met the powerful classical prose of Muhammad Abduh (1849–1905), and the nationalist-laden expressive prose of Saad Zaghloul in Al-Waqa'i' al-Misriyya (Egyptian Affairs) newspaper. Was also seen Muhammad al-Muwailihi's rhyming prose (died 1930), Mustafa Lutfi al-Manfaluti's sweet romantic prose (1876–1924), as well as the works of Jurji Zaydan (1861–1914), Yagob Sarrof (died 1927), and Qasim Amin (1863–1908) that relied on uniform ideas and lucid expressions to perform social-educational purposes.

As for romantic valor (hamasah), such as the works of Mustafa Kamil (1874–1908) and Wali Eddin Yakun (died 1921), this genre first appeared in journals. Other genres such as sardonic narratives mixed with colloquialisms, as in the works of Yaqub Sanu (1839–1912) and Abdullah al-Nadim (died 1896), gained their socio-literary power from appearing in journals.

== 19th and 20th century ==
Through the 19th century and early 20th centuries, a number of new developments in Arabic literature started to emerge, initially sticking closely to the classical forms, but addressing modern themes and the challenges faced by the Arab world in the modern era. Francis Marrash (born between 1835 and 1837; died 1873 or 1874) was influential in introducing French romanticism in the Arab world, especially through his use of poetic prose and prose poetry, of which his writings were the first examples in modern Arabic literature, according to Salma Khadra Jayyusi and Shmuel Moreh. He also tried to introduce "a revolution in diction, themes, metaphor and imagery in modern Arabic poetry", sometimes even mocking conventional poetic themes. (Note: In the introduction to his poetry book Mir'at al-Hasna' (The Mirror of the Beautiful One), which was first published in 1872, Marrash rejected even the traditional genres of Arabic poetry, particularly panegyrics and lampoons.) In Egypt, Ahmad Shawqi (1868–1932), among others, began to explore the limits of the classical qasida, although he remained a clearly neo-classical poet. After him, others, including Hafez Ibrahim (1871–1932) began to use poetry to explore themes of anticolonialism as well as the classical concepts. In 1914, Muhammad Husayn Haykal (1888–1956) published Zaynab, often considered the first modern Egyptian novel. This novel started a movement of modernizing Arabic fiction.

Jurji Zaydan (1861–1914) developed the genre of the Arabic historical novel. May Ziadeh (1886–1941) was also a key figure in the early 20th century Arabic literary scene.

A group of young writers formed The New School, and in 1925 began publishing the weekly literary journal Al-Fajr (The Dawn), which would have a great impact on Arabic literature. The group was especially influenced by 19th-century Russian writers such as Dostoyevsky, Tolstoy and Gogol. At about the same time, the Mahjari poets, of whom the most famous is Kahlil Gibran (1883–1931), further contributed to the development of the forms available to Arab poets. From the American diaspora emerged the new Pen League of authors like Gibran and Ameen Rihani (died 1940). The works produced by members of this league quickly spread through the Middle East, as new currents in modern Arabic prose took shape. Gibran, for instance, not only published works in both Arabic and English, but attempted to self-translate some of his works, such as his collection entitled Sand and Foam (1926). Some later returned to Lebanon, such as Mikha'il Na'ima (1898–1989).

An example of modern poetry in classical Arabic style with themes of Pan-Arabism is the work of Aziz Pasha Abaza. He came from Abaza family which produced notable Arabic literary figures including Fekry Pasha Abaza, Tharwat Abaza, and Desouky Bek Abaza, among others.

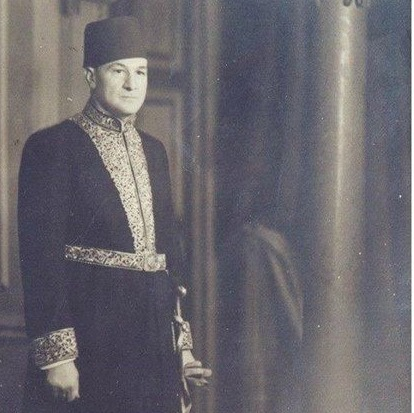
Aziz Pasha Abaza, poet from the aristocratic literary Egyptian family the House of Abaza of Circassian Abazin origin

== Literary genres ==
=== Novels ===
Arabic literature was not entirely lacking of narrative prose. There existed many lengthy works of literature such as Kitab al-Aghani (The Book of Songs) by Abu al-Faraj al-Isfahani, Qisas al-anbiya'a (The Stories of Prophets) by al-Tha'alibi, as well as the eloquent maqama. This latter work, characterized by its embellishing rhythmic prose style, is thought to be the invention of Badi' al-Zaman al-Hamadani's (969–1007).

The realization of the novel underwent extensive efforts to reach its full, complete form. The first attempts in writing novels were on the hands of Jurji Zaydan in his historical novel Sukot (Silence), and Farah Antun's (1874–1922) experimentation in the analytical novel. Other writers benefited from the foreign repertoire in discussing social and political matters. Non-fiction Arabic books were hence written to reflect new current concerns as well as the authors' thoughts and convictions. This is clearly present in the writings of Abd al-Rahman al-Kawakibi (born 1854 or 1855; died 1902) in Taba'i al-Istibdad wa-Masari' al-Isti'bad (The Nature of Despotism) and Umm al-Qura, as well as Qasim Amin's Tahrir al-Mar'a (The Liberation of the Woman). Authors like Aisha Taymur (died 1902) and Malak Hifni Nasif (died 1918) were also inspired by the foreign cultures but maintained—along with Qasim Amin—an Islamic and didactic spirit.

Poetry, on the other hand, was not affected by foreign models until World War I, and remained in its ridged form that was prevalent since the age of decadence. Nonetheless, poetry was slightly affected by some of the nationalistic issues and debates taking place across the Arab World. Famous poets of the period included Mahmoud Sami el-Baroudi (1839–1904), Ahmed Shawqi (1868–1932), and Hafez Ibrahim (1871–1932) from Egypt. These poets differed in their styles, sense of solidarity, and the degree of involvement in nationalist events. However, their names are usually associated with the rise of the neo-classical movement in poetry.

Ibrahim al-Mazini (born 1889 or 1890; died 1949) was probably among the most prominent authors who employed his style in the production of new literary themes, when he wrote his successful social novel Ibrahim al-Kateb (Ibrahim the Writer), which was essentially a description of current social norms. Since then, the novel flourished through the contributions of many authors like: Tawfiq al-Hakim in Awdat erroh (The Return of the Spirit, 1933), followed by Abbas Mahmoud al-Aqqad's Sara (1933), Taymour's Nida'a al-Majhoul (The Call of the Unknown, 1939), while Muhammad Farid Abu Hadid wrote the all-Arabic novel Ibnat al-Muluk (The Daughter of Kings). The success this novel attained later supported Zaydan in his own endeavors.

As for the psycho-analytical novel, it was introduced by Taha Hussein for the first time in his autobiographical novel Al-Ayyam (The Days, 1926). This novel was one of the greatest works of modern Arabic literature with its themes, style and depiction of life.

=== Short stories and articles ===
Authors in Egypt, Syria, Lebanon, Iraq, and the Mahjar wrote many short stories. However, it was the article, of all genres, that had undergone profound development and change. The reason for this was due to the rise of and the attention which journals and newspapers received since the Egyptian revolution of 1919. The articles changed in style and form and were tailored towards discussing various topics, including social and political issues, literature, religion, etc. It eventually reached the elevated level of its foreign counterpart. Among the important topics discussed in articles were the reformation of the Arabic culture and its comparison with foreign traditions and civilizations, including Latin and Greek traditions.

Writers of articles included Taha Hussein and Abbas Mahmoud al-Aqqad, advocates of innovation of style; the conservative Muhammad Rashid Rida (1865–1935) who wrote for the magazine Al-Manar; as well as Farid Wajdi and Mostafa Saadeq al-Rafe'ie (1880–1937). From Syria, there was Muhammad Kurd Ali (1876–1953), and from Lebanon and the Diaspora Mikha'il Na'ima (1889-1988). Whether they were supporters of innovative or traditional styles, these authors played an important role in reforming old and new notions of both extreme ends; they found a balance between the two directions after an extensive filtration of ideas and opinions. In addition, these authors influenced the following current of thought which promoted scientific reasoning in the process of writing the article. Later on, social criticism, which had already become an active element in the article, found its place in the novel. For example, this could be seen clearly in the novels of Tawfiq al-Hakim, Husayn Fawzi's The Modern Sindibad, as well as in the works of Naguib Mahfouz, Hassan Kamil, and many more. Subsequent to that, the novel took a turn in realism, disregarded style, and promoted many political currents, particularly after World War II.

=== Plays ===
The musical plays of Lebanese Maroun Naccache from the mid-1800s are considered as the birth of not only theatre in Lebanon, but also of modern Arabic theatre. Modern Arabic drama began to be written in the 19th century chiefly in Egypt and mainly influenced and in imitation of French works. It was not until the 20th century that it began to develop a distinctly Arab flavour and be seen elsewhere. The most important Arab playwright was Tawfiq al-Hakim whose first play was a re-telling of the Qur'anic story of the Seven Sleepers and the second an epilogue for the Thousand and One Nights.

As is the case with other literary genres, the first accounts of plays during that period were in the form of translations and adaptations of Western works. Gradually, however, the stage, particularly in Egypt, reached its full potency as Egyptian dramatist began writing plays that reflected the current socio-political situation of the country and its people. A major theme that was recurrent in most of the plays was the West-East struggle; an issue that seemed to have both coincided and aggravated the search for an Egyptian national identity.

The shift towards realism that took place in writing the novel also extended to the play. Dramatic plays, particularly in Egypt, flourished immensely, and subsequently dominated the rest of the Arab world. Mahmoud Taymour was the first to experiment with the social realist play, but it did not reach its full potency except on the hands of Tawfiq al-Hakim, who mastered motifs and mental representations, utilized Pharaonic, Islamic, and Western myths, and wrote remarkable cognitive plays such as Ahl al-Kahf (The People of the Cave) and Scheherazade. He also wrote social plays including Al-Sultan al-Ha'er (the Bewildered Sultan). Ahmed Shawqi's contributions to the poetic theater, taken up later by Aziz Abaza, are noticeable for their dealing with historical and classical themes.

The employment of colloquial Arabic within the dialogues of the plays was a central issue for Arab playwrights. The issue, however, was not as prominent in novels and stories as it was in plays. Nevertheless, al-Hakim and Taymour both tried to utilize colloquialisms in dialogues in both novels and stories, yet their success did not stop the debate that had risen as a result. In fact, this debate led Taymour to refrain from using colloquialisms in his writings, and he rewrote his previous works by replacing any colloquialisms with Modern Standard Arabic. Despite many efforts to create a distinct colloquial literature, particularly in Lebanon, all attempts failed. Reaching a necessary compromise between the two was done by simplifying the Standard form and elevating the status of the colloquial. However, judgments of this issue and its implications are yet to be explored, although some argue that the use of colloquialism in Arabic drama may have been a direct result from the interaction with the Western forms of literary production.

Both the spread of education and of Standard Arabic in mass media offered solutions for the literary function of varieties of Arabic. Some of these solutions were due to articles in journals and newspapers as these created a new form of prose, characterized by precision and an ability to portray reality in a way that surpassed literary prose. Through this new variety of language, modern authors were able to find specific expressions in standard Arabic that allowed them to portray reality.

=== Poetry ===
Poetry made way for prose, particularly after the war. While the influence of Western literature accelerated the production of innovative literary prose in Arabic, poetry was slower in liberating itself from classical poetic forms and creating new rhythms and melodic moods. As classical Arabic poetry held an important position in the literary heritage of the Arabs, it is not surprising that the first attempts in renewing the poetic forms would be by a re-employment of these traditional forms.

Insofar as Suleyman al-Boustani's (died 1925) attempt in introducing new forms by a rather mediocre translation of the Iliad into Arabic, the role it played was weaker than to be mentioned in the movement towards reformation.

Nationalist poetry was an important element in the progression of modern verse, whose doyen is Tunisian poet Aboul-Qacem Echebbi (died 1934). Echebbi succeeded in using traditional models and imageries to present new and powerful reflections of the current time. Others tried to create psychological effects by playing with rhymes and old structures. Gradually, classical poetic forms were replaced by newer forms. The guiding force behind that change is due to literary schools of thought such as al-Diwan Group, led mainly by poets Abbas Mahmoud al-Aqqad, Ibrahim al-Mazini, and Abdel Rahman Shokry (influenced by neo-romanticism); the New York Pen League, which included Elia Abu Madi; and the Andalusian League, which included Rashid Salim al-Khoury and Fawzi Ma'louf. Members of all these schools called for a change in the poetic production. They also advocated liberating poetry from classical forms, as well as a call for sincerity of emotions, self-inspiration, and portrayal of direct feelings.

The result of these efforts was a powerful Romantic poetry (ghazal). The pioneers of this type of poetry were the members of the Apollo Group. Led by Ahmed Zaki Abu Shadi (died 1955), and competing against the New School of Khalil Mutran in Egypt, and Elias Abu Shabaki's in Lebanon, the Diwan Poets, and the Leagues, the Apollo Group was more liberated and largely influenced by Western Romanticism. The Apollo Group's contributions to the new, unrestricted forms of poetry is largely manifested in the periodical 'Apollo', a magazine that fostered and proliferated both traditional and innovative styles of poetry.

While al-Aqqad and other poets in Iraq remained faithful to classical forms of poetry, others, including poet Abdel Rahman Shokry, the Northern Diaspora School, and the Apollo Group, all diverted greatly from these traditional forms. In fact, the argument that existed between the proponents of Classical poetry who favored the single-rhyme and meter poem, and those advocated the free verse poem (shi'r hurr) remains till this day. A few years later, the prose poem appeared in the 1970s. Writers of this hybrid form were Ameen al-Rihani, Onsy Al-Hajj, and Shawqi Abi Shaqra (Lebanon), Jabra Ibrahim Jabra, Tawfiq Al-Sayegh, Ezz Eddin al-Munasira (Palestine), Muhammad al-Maghut (Syria), Sargon Boulus, Fadil Al-Azzawi, Mu'ayyid al-Rawi (Iraq). Al-Rawi created a new genre in Arabic poetry by liberating it from rhythm and metre, and replacing that with inner music, while maintaining the original imageries.

== Themes ==
=== Social themes ===
Social themes along with reformations in the field of poetry were not greatly affected despite the attempts some poets such as Khalil Mutran (1872–1949) to inflict some changes on the genre. Other attempts were made by Jamil Sidqi al-Zahawi (1863–1936) and al-Rasafi (1875–1954) in Iraq, though with little or no implications. This can be due to the fact that poetry in Iraq did not suffer the same decline as it did in Egypt and the Levant, which were under unstable political circumstances.

After the war, modern Arabic literature changed dramatically. Topics such as modernity and social change, and people's interests and doubts, all became the center of the new themes of literature. The first to have undertaken this change are the disciples of Mohammad Abduh, who were advocates of liberated and innovative thought. These students eventually governed Al-Jarida (The Newspaper) and Al-Siyasa (The Politics), two newspapers which were jointly edited by Lutfy Asyyed and Muhammad Husayn Haykal. These newspapers also proliferated the new literary genres of novels, stories, articles and plays. One of the first successful realizations of these genres was Haykal's novel Zaynab (1914) which demonstrated the difficulty of wielding Arabic rhetoric in writing the social novel. Mohammad Taymour (died 1921) tried to overcome these difficulties with his novel Ma taraho al-Oyon (What the eyes see), a task that was supported by his brother's (Mahmoud Taymour) efforts. Many others including Issa Obeid, Shahata Obeid, and Taher Lasheen contributed to the novel, yet were never able to reach the elevated stylistic and linguistic abilities of the Taymour brothers in their portrayal of a realistic and vivid life.

== Arabic exile literature ==
Since the 1990s, Arabic exile literature (adab al-manfa) in Europe and elsewhere has increasingly become a literature written from the perspective of refugees, asylum seekers, undocumented migrants and others, who are situated outside normatively defined citizenship. In her book Arabic Exile Literature in Europe, Johanna Sellman, assistant professor of Arabic Literature at Ohio State University, analysed the changing aesthetic and political dimensions of Arabic exile literature and demonstrated how frameworks such as East-West cultural encounters, political commitment and modernist understandings of exile – which were dominant in 20th-century Arabic exile literature – have been giving way to writing that explores the dynamics of forced migration and the liminal spaces of borders and borderlands.

== See also ==
- Algerian literature
- Bahraini literature
- Egyptian literature since the 20th century
- Iraqi literature since the 20th century
- Lebanese literature
- Libyan literature
- Moroccan literature since the 20th century
- Palestinian literature
- Qatari literature - since the 20th century
- Sudanese literature since the 20th century
- Syrian literature since the 20th century
- Tunisian literature

== Sources ==
- Jayyusi, Salma Khadra (1977). Trends and Movements in Modern Arabic Poetry. Vol. I. Brill. ISBN 978-90-04-04920-8.
- Moreh, S. (1976). Modern Arabic Poetry 1800–1970: The Development of its Forms and Themes under the Influence of Western Literature. Studies in Arabic Literature, 5. Leiden: E. J. Brill. ISBN 90-04-04795-6.
- Moreh, Shmuel (1988). Studies in Modern Arabic Prose and Poetry. Brill. ISBN 978-90-04-08359-2.
- Somekh, Sasson (1992). "The Neo-classical Arabic poets". In Badawi, Mohammed Mustafa (ed.). Modern Arabic Literature. Cambridge University Press. ISBN 978-0-521-33197-5.
- Starkey, Paul (2006). Modern Arabic Literature. Edinburgh: Edinburgh University Press. ISBN 0-7486-1291-2.
