= Abd al-Masih Haddad =

Journalist in Syria

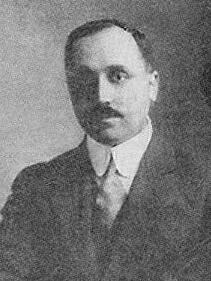
- Haddad in 1920.
- Native name: عبد المسيح حداد
- Born: 1890; Homs, Ottoman Syria
- Died: January 17, 1963 (aged 72–73); New York City, United States
- Occupation: Writer, journalist
- Children: Jerrier A. Haddad
- Relatives: Nadra Haddad (brother)

Abd al-Masih Haddad (Arabic: عبد المسيح حداد, ALA-LC: ʻAbd al-Masīḥ Ḥaddād; 1890–1963) was a Syrian writer of the Mahjar movement and journalist. His magazine As-Sayeh (The Traveler), started in 1912 and continued until 1957, presented the works of prominent Mahjari literary figures in the United States and became the "spokesman" of the Pen League which he co-founded with Nasib Arida in 1915 or 1916. His collection Hikayat al-Mahjar (The Stories of Expatriation), which he published in 1921, extended "the scope of the readership of fiction" in modern Arabic literature according to Muhammad Mustafa Badawi.

== Life ==
Haddad was born in Homs, then a city of Ottoman Syria (modern-day Syria), to a Greek Orthodox family. He went to the Russian Teachers' Seminary in Nazareth, where he met Mikha'il Na'ima and Nasib Arida. In 1907, he immigrated to New York, where he founded the Arabic-language magazine As-Sayeh (The Traveler) in 1912, which continued to be published until 1957. (Note: As-Sayeh is on microfilm in the Library of Congress.) It presented the works of such Mahjari literary figures as Amin Rihani, Kahlil Gibran, Elia Abu Madi, and Na'ima. In 1915 or 1916 along with Arida he co-founded the Pen League in New York, an Arabic-language literary society, later joined by Gibran, Na'ima and other Mahjari poets in 1920. In 1921, he published his collection Hikayat al-Mahjar (The Stories of Expatriation) in As-Sayeh. Another of his works, Intiba'at Mughtarib (Travel Account), which he had written after a short visit to Syria, was published in Damascus in 1962.

== Works ==
Title	Periodical or publisher	Location	Date	Translated title
حكايات المهجر	As-Sayeh	New York	1921	The Stories of Expatriation
انطباعات مغترب في سورية	وزارة الثقافة والارشاد القومي	Damascus	1962	Travel Account in Syria

== Bibliography ==
- Bawardi, Hani J. (2015). The Making of Arab Americans: From Syrian Nationalism to U.S. Citizenship (1st ed.). Texas: University of Texas Press. ISBN 978-1-47730-752-6.
- Badawi, M.M. (1992). Modern Arabic Literature. Vol. 3. Cambridge University Press. ISBN 9780521331975.
- Haiek, Joseph R. (1984). Arab-American Almanac. News Circle Publishing House. ISBN 978-0-915652-21-1.
- Literary innovation in modern Arabic literature. Herder. 2000.
- Media History Digest. Vol. 5. 1985.
- Meisami, Julie Scott; Starkey, Paul, eds. (1998). Encyclopedia of Arabic Literature. Vol. 1. Routledge. ISBN 9780415185714.
- Moreh, Shmuel (1976). Modern Arabic Poetry. Leiden: E. J. Brill. ISBN 9004047956.
- Popp, Richard Alan (2001). "Al-Rābiṭah al-Qalamīyah, 1916". Journal of Arabic Literature. 32 (1). Brill: 30–52. doi:10.1163/157006401X00123. JSTOR 4183426.
