= As-Sayeh =

- Founder: Abd al-Masih Haddad
- First issue: 1912
- Final issue: 1957
- Country: United States
- Based in: New York City
- Language: Arabic

As-Sayeh (Arabic: السائح, romanized: al-Sāʼiḥ, lit. 'The Traveler') was an Arabic-language magazine founded in New York City by Abd al-Masih Haddad in 1912. It continued to be published until 1957. (Note: As-Sayeh is on microfilm in the Library of Congress.) It presented the works of prominent Mahjari literary figures in the United States (such as Amin Rihani, Kahlil Gibran, Mikha'il Na'ima and Elia Abu Madi) and became the "spokesman" of the Pen League which he co-founded with Nasib Arida in 1915 or 1916. Haddad published his own collection Hikayat al-Mahjar (The Stories of Expatriation) inside it in 1921.

== Bibliography ==
- Haiek, Joseph R. (1984). Arab-American Almanac. News Circle Publishing House. ISBN 978-0-915652-21-1.
- Literary innovation in modern Arabic literature. Herder. 2000.
- Media History Digest. Vol. 5. 1985.
- Meisami, Julie Scott; Starkey, Paul, eds. (1998). Encyclopedia of Arabic Literature. Vol. 1. Routledge. ISBN 9780415185714.
- Popp, Richard Alan (2001). "Al-Rābiṭah al-Qalamīyah, 1916". Journal of Arabic Literature. 32 (1). Brill: 30–52. doi:10.1163/157006401X00123. JSTOR 4183426.
