= Neo-romanticism =

Movements from the era of Romanticism

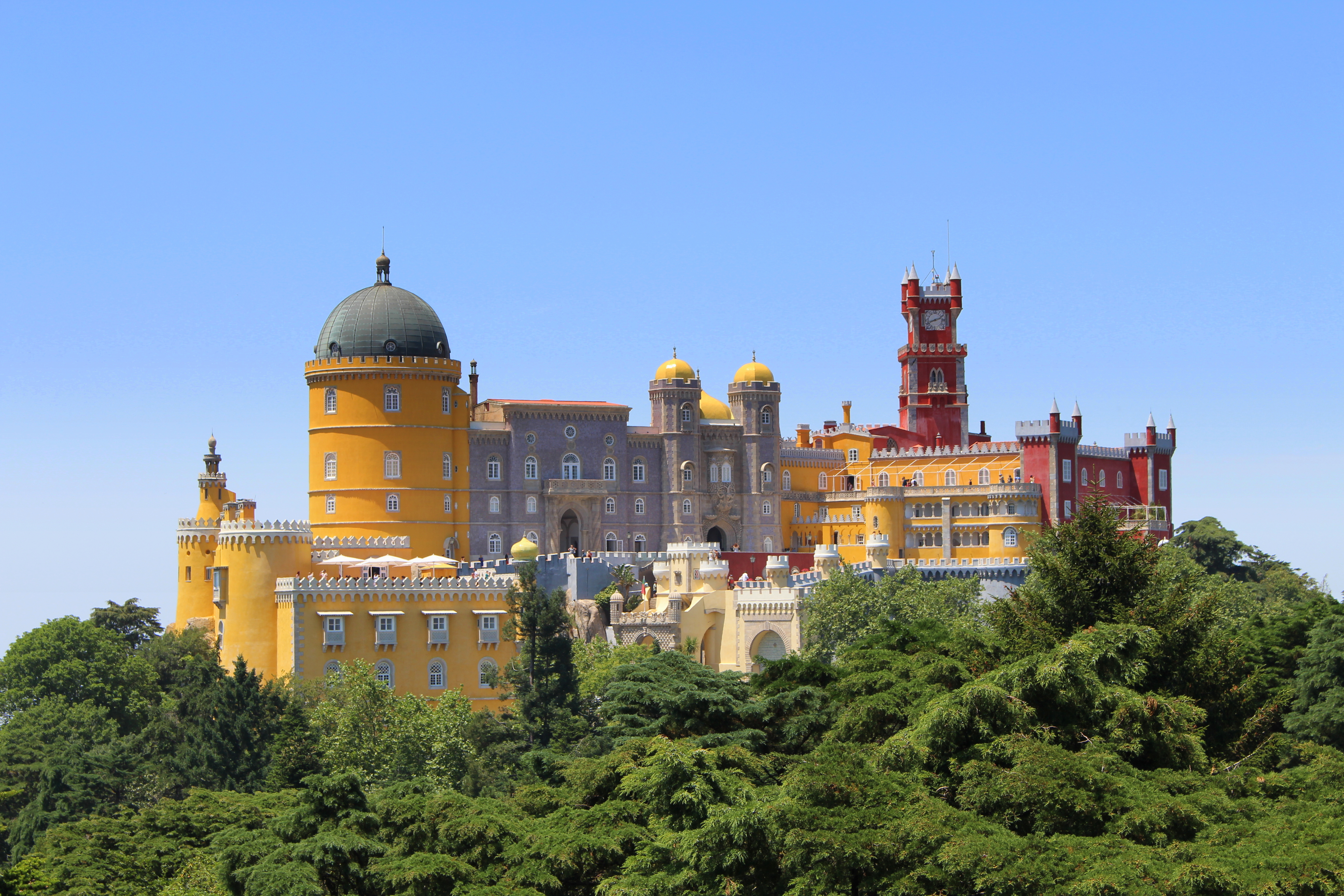
Pena Palace in Sintra, Portugal one of the points of reference for Neo-Romantic architecture

The term neo-romanticism is used to cover a variety of movements in philosophy, literature, music, painting, and architecture, as well as social movements, that exist after and incorporate elements from the era of Romanticism.

It has been used with reference to late-19th-century composers such as Richard Wagner particularly by Carl Dahlhaus who describes his music as "a late flowering of romanticism in a positivist age". He regards it as synonymous with "the age of Wagner", from about 1850 until 1890—the start of the era of modernism, whose leading early representatives were Richard Strauss and Gustav Mahler (Dahlhaus 1979, 98–99, 102, 105). It has been applied to writers, painters, and composers who rejected, abandoned, or opposed realism, naturalism, or avant-garde modernism at various points in time from about 1840 down to the present.

== Late 19th century and early 20th century ==
Neo-romanticism as well as Romanticism is considered in opposition to naturalism—indeed, so far as music is concerned, naturalism is regarded as alien and even hostile (Dahlhaus 1979, 100). In the period following German unification in 1871, naturalism rejected Romantic literature as a misleading, idealistic distortion of reality. Naturalism in turn came to be regarded as incapable of filling the "void" of modern existence. Critics such as Hermann Bahr, Heinrich Mann, and Eugen Diederichs came to oppose naturalism and materialism under the banner of "neo-romanticism", demanding a cultural reorientation responding to "the soul's longing for a meaning and content in life" that might replace the fragmentations of modern knowledge with a holistic world view (Kohlenbach 2009, 261).

== Late 20th century ==
"Neo-romanticism" was proposed as an alternative label for the group of German composers identified with the short-lived Neue Einfachheit movement in the late 1970s and early 1980s. Along with other phrases such as "new tonality", this term has been criticised for lack of precision because of the diversity among these composers, whose leading member is Wolfgang Rihm (Hentschel 2006, 111).

== Britain ==
=== 1880–1910 ===
- Lewis Carroll
- John Ruskin
- Edward Elgar
- Gerard Manley Hopkins
- Ralph Vaughan Williams
- The Aesthetic movement and the Arts and Crafts Movement
- Symbolism (arts)
- Rudyard Kipling
- Robert Louis Stevenson
- A. E. Housman
- Neo-Gothic architecture
- Some modes of pictorialism in photography.

=== 1930–1955 ===
In British art history, the term "neo-romanticism" is applied to a loosely affiliated school of landscape painting that emerged around 1930 and continued until the early 1950s. It was first labeled in March 1942 by the critic Raymond Mortimer in the New Statesman. These painters looked back to 19th-century artists such as William Blake and Samuel Palmer, but were also influenced by French cubist and post-cubist artists such as Pablo Picasso, André Masson, and Pavel Tchelitchew (Clark and Clarke 2001; Hopkins 2001). This movement was motivated in part as a response to the threat of invasion during World War II. Artists particularly associated with the initiation of this movement included Paul Nash, John Piper, Henry Moore, Ivon Hitchens, and especially Graham Sutherland. A younger generation included John Minton, Michael Ayrton, John Craxton, Keith Vaughan, Robert Colquhoun, and Robert MacBryde (Button 1996).

== United States ==
- Paul Creston
- Justine Kurland's photography
- Thomas Mayne Reid
- Donna Tartt, in particular her popular 1992 debut novel The Secret History

== Western Europe ==
The aesthetic philosophy of Arthur Schopenhauer and Friedrich Nietzsche has contributed greatly to neo-romantic thinking.

Austria

- Anton Bruckner

France

- Edmond Rostand

Germany

- Richard Strauss
- Wandervogel

Iceland

- Sigurdur Nordal

Ireland

- W.B. Yeats

Italy

- Rafael Sabatini

Norway

- Knut Hamsun

== Eastern Europe ==
Belarusian

- Uladzimir Karatkevich
- Yanka Kupala

Estonian

- Johannes Semper
- Marie Under

Georgian

- Alexander Kazbegi

Greece

- Odysseus Elytis

Hungarian

- Mór Jókai

Polish

- Young Poland Movement
- Antoni Lange
- Stanisław Przybyszewski
- Tadeusz Miciński
- Karol Szymanowski

Russian

- Eugene Berman
- Maxim Gorky (early works) (Kahn et al. 2018, 599–605)
- Alexander Grin (Kahn et al. 2018, 599–605)
- Vladimir Nabokov, in particular his 1932 novel Glory
- Konstantin Paustovsky (Kahn et al. 2018, 599–605)
- Sergei Rachmaninoff
- Pavel Tchelitchew

Slovenian

- Dragotin Kette

== Arab world ==
Within the Modern Arabic literature, neo-romanticism began in the early 20th century and flourished during the 1930s–1940s, that sought inspiration from French or English romantic poetry. Most famous its part is the Mahjar ("émigré" school) that includes Arabic-language poets in the Americas Ameen Rihani, Kahlil Gibran, Nasib Arida, Mikhail Naimy, Elia Abu Madi, Fawsi Maluf, Farhat, and al-Qarawi. The neo-romantic current also involved poets in every Arabian country: Abdel Rahman Shokry, Abbas Mahmoud al-Aqqad and Ibrahim al-Mazini in Egypt, Omar Abu Risha in Syria, Elias Abu Shabaki and Salah Labaki in Lebanon, Abu al-Qasim al-Shabbi in Tunisia, and Al-Tijani Yusuf Bashir in Sudan.(Jayyusi 1977, 361–474)

== India ==
In the Indian literature neo-romanticism was represented by the Chhayavaad movement.

== Japan ==
Beginning in the mid-1930s and continuing through World War II, a Japanese neo-romantic literary movement was led by the writer Yasuda Yojūrō (Torrance 2010, 66).

== See also ==
- Romantic music
- Guild socialism
- Utopian socialism
- Wandervogel
- Robert Baden-Powell
- Metamodernism

=== Modern manifestations ===
- Fantasy art
- Goth subculture
- Regionalism (art)
- Neopagan
- Neofolk
- Neoromanticism (music)
- Neotribalism
- New Romantic
