= Nahda =

Cultural movement in the Arab world (19th–20th centuries)

The Nahda (Arabic: النّهضة, romanized: an-Nahḍa, lit. 'the Awakening'), also referred to as the Arab Awakening, Arab Enlightenment or Arab Renaissance, was a cultural movement that flourished in Arab-populated regions of the Ottoman Empire, notably in Syria, Lebanon, Egypt, and Tunisia, during the second half of the 19th century and the early 20th century.

In traditional scholarship, the Nahda is seen as connected to the cultural shock brought on by Napoleon's invasion of Egypt in 1798, and the reformist drive of subsequent rulers such as Muhammad Ali of Egypt. However, more recent scholarship has shown the Nahda's cultural reform program to have been as "autogenetic" as it was Western-inspired, having been linked to the Tanzimat—the period of political reform within the Ottoman Empire which brought a constitutional order to Ottoman politics and engendered a new political class—as well as the later Young Turk Revolution, allowing proliferation of the press and other publications and internal changes in political economy and communal reformations in Egypt and Syria and Lebanon.

The renaissance itself started simultaneously in both Egypt and the Levant. Due to their differing backgrounds, the aspects that they focused on differed as well; with Egypt focused on the political aspects of the Muslim world while the Levant focused on the more cultural aspects. The concepts were not exclusive by region however, and this distinction blurred as the renaissance progressed.

== Early figures ==
=== Rifa'a al-Tahtawi ===
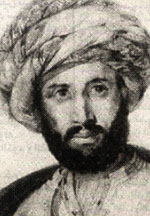
Rifa'a al-Tahtawi (1801–1873)

Egyptian scholar Rifa'a al-Tahtawi (1801–1873) is widely seen as the pioneering figure of the Nahda. He was sent to Paris in 1826 by Muhammad Ali's government to study Western sciences and educational methods, although originally to serve as Imam for the Egyptian cadets training at the Paris military academy. He came to hold a very positive view of French society, although not without criticisms. Learning French, he began translating important scientific and cultural works into Arabic. He also witnessed the July Revolution of 1830, against Charles X, but was careful in commenting on the matter in his reports to Muhammad Ali. His political views, originally influenced by the conservative Islamic teachings of al-Azhar University, changed on a number of matters, and he came to advocate parliamentarism and women's education.

After five years in France, he then returned to Egypt to implement the philosophy of reform he had developed there, summarizing his views in the book Takhlis al-Ibriz fi Talkhis Bariz (sometimes translated as The Quintessence of Paris), published in 1834. It is written in rhymed prose, and describes France and Europe from an Egyptian Muslim viewpoint. Tahtawi's suggestion was that Egypt and the Muslim world had much to learn from Europe, and he generally embraced Western society, but also held that reforms should be adapted to the values of Islamic culture. This brand of self-confident but open-minded modernism came to be the defining creed of the Nahda.

=== Ahmad Faris al-Shidyaq ===
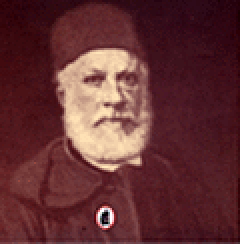
Ahmad Faris al-Shidyaq (born 1805 or 1806; died 1887)

Ahmad Faris al-Shidyaq (born 1805 or 1806 as Faris ibn Yusuf al-Shidyaq; died 1887) grew up in present-day Lebanon. A Maronite Christian by birth, he later lived in major cities of the Arab world, where he had his career. He converted to Protestantism during the nearly two decades that he lived and worked in Cairo, present-day Egypt, from 1825 to 1848. He also spent time on the island of Malta. Participating in an Arabic translation of the Bible in Great Britain that was published in 1857, Faris lived and worked there for 7 years, becoming a British citizen. He next moved to Paris, France, for two years in the early 1850s, where he wrote and published some of his most important work.

Later in the 1850s Faris moved to Tunisia, where in 1860 he converted to Islam, taking the first name Ahmad. Moving to Istanbul later that year to work as a translator at the request of the Ottoman government, Faris also founded an Arabic-language newspaper. It was supported by the Ottomans, Egypt and Tunisia, publishing until the late 1880s.

Faris continued to promote Arabic language and culture, resisting the 19th-century "Turkization" pushed by the Ottomans based in present-day Turkey. Shidyaq is considered to be one of the founding fathers of modern Arabic literature; he wrote most of his fiction in his younger years.

=== Butrus al-Bustani ===
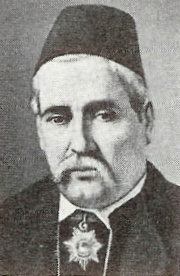
Butrus al-Bustani, 1860

Butrus al-Bustani (1819–1893) was born to a Lebanese Maronite Christian family in the village of Dibbiye in the Chouf region, in January 1819. A polyglot, educator, and activist, Al-Bustani was a tour de force in the Nahda centered in mid-nineteenth century Beirut. Having been influenced by American missionaries, he converted to Protestantism, becoming a leader in the native Protestant church. Initially, he taught in the schools of the Protestant missionaries at 'Abey and was a central figure in the missionaries' translation of the Bible into Arabic. Despite his close ties to the Americans, Al-Bustani increasingly became independent, eventually breaking away from them.

After the bloody 1860 Druze–Maronite conflict and the increasing entrenchment of confessionalism, Al-Bustani founded the National School or Al-Madrasa Al-Wataniyya in 1863, on secular principles. This school employed the leading Nahda "pioneers" of Beirut and graduated a generation of Nahda thinkers. At the same time, he compiled and published several school textbooks and dictionaries; leading him to becoming known famously as the Master of the Arabic Renaissance.

In the social, national and political spheres, Al-Bustani founded associations with a view to forming a national elite and launched a series of appeals for unity in his magazine Nafir Suriyya.

In the cultural/scientific fields, he published a fortnightly review and two daily newspapers. In addition, he began work, together with Drs. Eli Smith and Cornelius Van Dyck of the American Mission, on a translation of the Bible into Arabic known as the Smith-Van Dyke translation.

His prolific output and groundbreaking work led to the creation of modern Arabic expository prose. While educated by Westerners, and a strong advocate of Western technology, he was a fierce secularist, playing a decisive role in formulating the principles of Syrian nationalism (not to be confused with Arab nationalism).

Stephen Sheehi states that Al-Bustani's "importance does not lie in his prognosis of Arab culture or his national pride. Nor is his advocacy of discriminatingly adopting Western knowledge and technology to "awaken" the Arabs' inherent ability for cultural success,(najah), unique among his generation. Rather, his contribution lies in the act of elocution. That is, his writing articulates a specific formula for native progress that expresses a synthetic vision of the matrix of modernity within Ottoman Syria."

Bustani's son Salim was also part of the movement.

=== Hayreddin Pasha ===
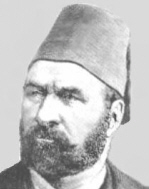
Hayreddin Pasha (1820–1890)

Hayreddin Pasha al-Tunsi (1820–1890) had made his way to Ottoman Tunisia as a slave, where he rose through the ranks of the government of Ahmad Bey, the modernizing ruler of Tunisia. He soon was made responsible for diplomatic missions to the Ottoman Empire and the countries of Europe, bringing him into contact with Western ideals, as well as with the Tanzimat reforms of the Ottoman Empire. He served as Prime Minister of Tunisia from 1859 until 1882. In this period, he was a major force of modernization in Tunisia.

In numerous writings, he envisioned a seamless blending of Islamic tradition with Western modernization. Basing his beliefs on European Enlightenment writings and Arabic political thought, his main concern was with preserving the autonomy of the Tunisian people in particular, and Muslim peoples in general. In this quest, he ended up bringing forth what amounted to the earliest example of Muslim constitutionalism. His modernizing theories have had an enormous influence on Tunisian and Ottoman thought.

=== Francis Marrash ===
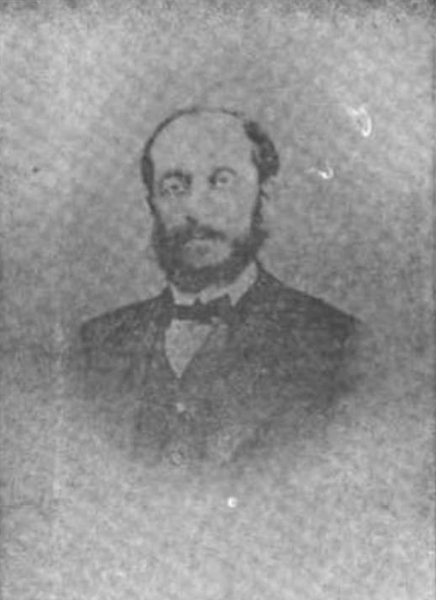
Francis Marrash (1835 or 29 June 1836 – 1874)

Syrian scholar, publicist, writer, poet and physician Francis Marrash (1835 or 29 June 1836 – 1874) had traveled throughout West Asia and France in his youth. He expressed ideas of political and social reforms in Ghabat al-haqq (first published c. 1865), (Note: For example, he called for the introduction of representative democracy with equal suffrage, equality before the law, the development of infrastructure, support for trade and commerce, state funds for inventors, and the regular maintenance of buildings and public space.) highlighting the need of the Arabs for two things above all: modern schools and patriotism "free from religious considerations". In 1870, when distinguishing the notion of fatherland from that of nation and applying the latter to the region of Syria, Marrash pointed to the role played by language, among other factors, in counterbalancing religious and sectarian differences, and thus, in defining national identity.

Marrash has been considered the first truly cosmopolitan Arab intellectual and writer of modern times, having adhered to and defended the principles of the French Revolution in his own works, implicitly criticizing Ottoman rule in West Asia and North Africa.

He also tried to introduce "a revolution in diction, themes, metaphor and imagery in modern Arabic poetry". His use of conventional diction for new ideas is considered to have marked the rise of a new stage in Arabic poetry which was carried on by the Mahjaris.

== Politics and society ==
Proponents of the Nahda typically supported reforms. While al-Bustani and al-Shidyaq "advocated reform without revolution", the "trend of thought advocated by Francis Marrash [...] and Adib Ishaq" (1856–1884) was "radical and revolutionary.

In 1876, the Ottoman Empire promulgated a constitution, as the crowning accomplishment of the Tanzimat reforms (1839–1876) and inaugurating the Empire's First Constitutional Era. It was inspired by European methods of government and designed to bring the Empire back on level with the Western powers. The constitution was opposed by the Sultan, whose powers it checked, but had vast symbolic and political importance.

The introduction of parliamentarism also created a political class in the Ottoman-controlled provinces, from which later emerged a liberal nationalist elite that would spearhead the several nationalist movements, in particular Egyptian nationalism. Egyptian nationalism was non-Arab, emphasising ethnic Egyptian identity and history in response to European colonialism and the Turkish occupation of Egypt. This was paralleled by the rise of the Young Turks in the central Ottoman provinces and administration. The resentment towards Turkish rule fused with protests against the Sultan's autocracy, and the largely secular concepts of Arab nationalism rose as a cultural response to the Ottoman Caliphate's claims of religious legitimacy. Various Arab nationalist secret societies rose in the years prior to World War I, such as al-Fatat and al-ʽAhd, which was military-based.

This was complemented by the rise of other national movements, including Syrian nationalism, which like Egyptian nationalism was in some of its manifestations essentially non-Arabist and connected to the concept of the region of Syria. The main other example of the late al-Nahda era is the emerging Palestinian nationalism, which was set apart from Syrian nationalism by Jewish immigration to Mandatory Palestine and the resulting sense of Palestinian particularism.

=== Women's rights ===
Al-Shidyaq defended women's rights in Leg Over Leg, which was published as early as 1855 in Paris. Esther Moyal, a Lebanese Jewish author, wrote extensively on women's rights in her magazine The Family throughout the 1890s.

== Religion ==
=== Muslims ===
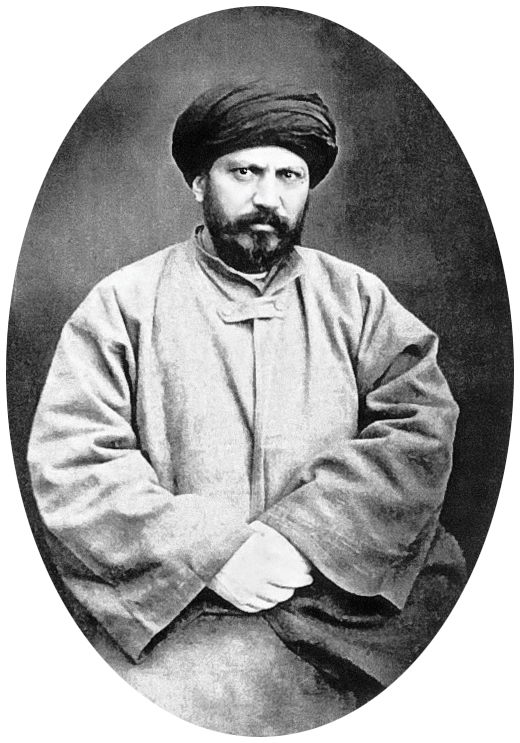
Sayyid Jamal-al-Din Afghani advocated Islamic unity in the face of an increasingly stronger Christian Europe.

In the religious field, Jamal al-Din al-Afghani (1839–1897) gave Islam a modernist reinterpretation and fused adherence to the faith with an anti-colonial doctrine that preached Pan-Islamic solidarity in the face of European pressures. He also favored the replacement of authoritarian monarchies with representative rule, and denounced what he perceived as the dogmatism, stagnation and corruption of the Islam of his age. He claimed that tradition (taqlid, تقليد) had stifled Islamic debate and repressed the correct practices of the faith. Al-Afghani's case for a redefinition of old interpretations of Islam, and his bold attacks on traditional religion, would become vastly influential with the fall of the Ottoman Caliphate in 1924. This created a void in the religious doctrine and social structure of Islamic communities which had been only temporarily reinstated by Abdul Hamid II in an effort to bolster universal Muslim support, suddenly vanished. It forced Muslims to look for new interpretations of the faith, and to re-examine widely held dogma; exactly what al-Afghani had urged them to do decades earlier.

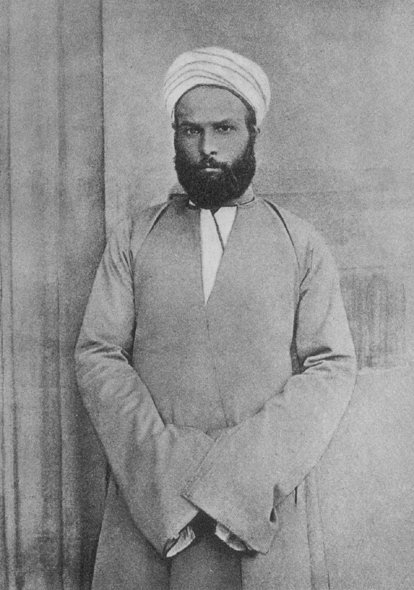
Muhammad Abduh

Al-Afghani influenced many, but greatest among his followers is undoubtedly his student Muhammad Abduh (1849–1905), with whom he started a short-lived Islamic revolutionary journal, Al-Urwah al-Wuthqa, and whose teachings would play a similarly important role in the reform of the practice of Islam. Like al-Afghani, Abduh accused traditionalist Islamic authorities of moral and intellectual corruption, and of imposing a doctrinaire form of Islam on the ummah, that had hindered correct applications of the faith. He therefore advocated that Muslims should return to the "true" Islam practiced by the ancient Caliphs, which he held had been both rational and divinely inspired. Applying the original message of the Islamic prophet Muhammad with no interference of tradition or the faulty interpretations of his followers, would automatically create the just society ordained by God in the Qur'an, and so empower the Muslim world to stand against colonization and injustices.

Among the students of Abduh were Syrian Islamic scholar and reformer Rashid Rida (1865–1935), who continued his legacy, and expanded on the concept of just Islamic government. His theses on how an Islamic state should be organized remain influential among modern-day Islamists such as the Muslim Brotherhood.

Shi'a scholars also contributed to the renaissance movement, including the linguist Ahmad Rida and his son-in-law the historian Muhammad Jaber Al Safa. Important political reforms took place simultaneously also in Iran and Shi'a religious beliefs saw important developments with the systematization of a religious hierarchy. A wave of political reform followed, with the constitutional movement in Iran to some extent paralleling the Egyptian Nahda reforms.

=== Christians ===
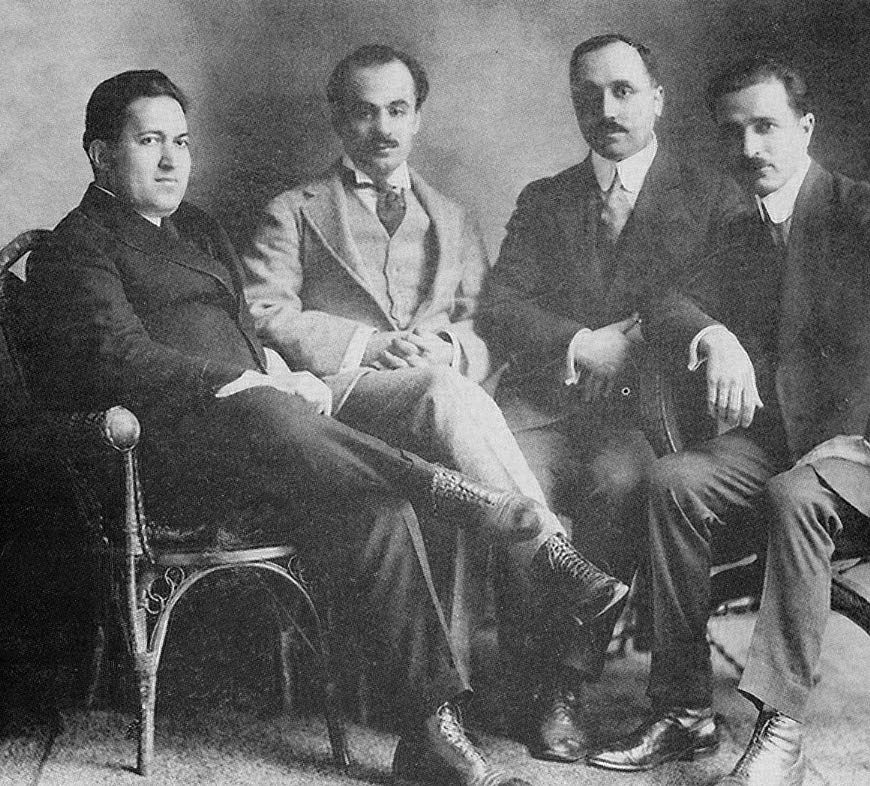
A 1920 photograph of four prominent members of The Pen League (from left to right): Nasib Arida, Kahlil Gibran, Abd al-Masih Haddad, and Mikhail Naimy.

Arab Christians played a crucial role in the Nahda movement. Their status as an educated minority enabled them to significantly influence and contribute to the fields of literature, politics, business, philosophy, music, theatre and cinema, medicine, and science. Damascus, Beirut, Cairo, and Aleppo were the main centers of the renaissance, which led to the establishment of schools, universities, theaters and printing presses there. This awakening led to the emergence of a politically active movement known as the "association" that was accompanied by the birth of Arab nationalism and the demand for reformation in the Ottoman Empire. This led to the calling of the establishment of modern states based on Europe. It was during this stage that the first compound of the Arabic language was introduced along with the printing of it in letters, and later the movement influenced the fields of music, sculpture, history, humanities, economics and human rights.

This cultural renaissance during the late Ottoman rule was a quantum leap for Arabs in the post-industrial revolution, and is not limited to the individual fields of cultural renaissance in the nineteenth century, as the Nahda only extended to include the spectrum of society and the fields as a whole. Christian colleges (accepting of all faiths) like Saint Joseph University, the Syrian Protestant College (which later became the American University of Beirut) and Al-Hikma University in Baghdad amongst others played a prominent role in the development of Arab culture. It is agreed amongst historians the importance the roles played by the Arab Christians in this renaissance, and their role in the prosperity through participation in the diaspora. Given this role in politics and culture, Ottoman ministers began to include them in their governments. In the economic sphere, a number of Christian families like the Greek Orthodox Sursock family became prominent. Thus, the Nahda led the Muslims and Christians to a cultural renaissance and national general despotism. This solidified Arab Christians as one of the pillars of the region and not a minority on the fringes.

The Mahjar (one of its more literal meanings being "the Arab diaspora") was a literary movement that preceded the Nahda movement. It was started by Christian Arabic-speaking writers who had emigrated to America from Lebanon, Syria and Palestine at the turn of the 20th century. The Pen League was the first Arabic-language literary society in North America, formed initially by Syrians Nasib Arida and Abd al-Masih Haddad. Members of the Pen League included: Kahlil Gibran, Elia Abu Madi, Mikhail Naimy, and Ameen Rihani. Eight out of the ten members were Greek Orthodox and two were Maronite Christians.

In the early 20th century, many prominent Arab nationalists were Christians, like the Syrian intellectual Constantin Zureiq, Ba'athism founder Michel Aflaq, and Jurji Zaydan, who was reputed to be the first Arab nationalist. Khalil al-Sakakini, a prominent Palestinian Jerusalemite, was Arab Orthodox, as was George Antonius, Lebanese author of The Arab Awakening.

== Science ==
Many student missions from Egypt went to Europe in the early 19th century to study arts and sciences at European universities and acquire technical skills.

Arabic-language magazines began to publish popular science articles.

== Modern literature ==
Through the 19th century and early 20th centuries, a number of new developments in Arabic literature started to emerge, initially sticking closely to the classical forms, but addressing modern themes and the challenges faced by the Arab world in the modern era. Francis Marrash was influential in introducing French romanticism in the Arab world, especially through his use of poetic prose and prose poetry, of which his writings were the first examples in modern Arabic literature, according to Salma Khadra Jayyusi and Shmuel Moreh. In Egypt, Ahmad Shawqi (1868–1932), among others, began to explore the limits of the classical qasida, although he remained a clearly neo-classical poet. After him, others, including Hafez Ibrahim (1871–1932) began to use poetry to explore themes of anticolonialism as well as the classical concepts. In 1914, Muhammad Husayn Haykal (1888–1956) published Zaynab, often considered the first modern Egyptian novel. This novel started a movement of modernizing Arabic fiction.

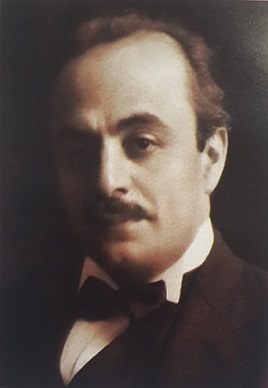
Kahlil Gibran (born Gibran Khalil Gibran), a prominent figure of the Mahjar in North America

A group of young writers formed Al-Madrasa al-Ḥadītha ('The New School'), and in 1925 began publishing the weekly literary journal Al-Fajr (The Dawn), which would have a great impact on Arabic literature. The group was especially influenced by 19th-century Russian writers such as Dostoyevsky, Tolstoy and Gogol. At about the same time, the Mahjari poets further contributed from America to the development of the forms available to Arab poets. The most famous of these, Kahlil Gibran (1883–1931), challenged political and religious institutions with his writing, and was an active member of the Pen League in New York City from 1920 until his death. Some of the Mahjaris later returned to Lebanon, such as Mikhail Naimy (1898–1989).

Jurji Zaydan (1861–1914) developed the genre of the Arabic historical novel, and in this respect was one of three major novelists of the Nahda alongside Nu'man al-Qasatili (1854–1920) and Butrus's son Salim al-Bustani. May Ziadeh (1886–1941) was also a key figure in the early 20th century Arabic literary scene.

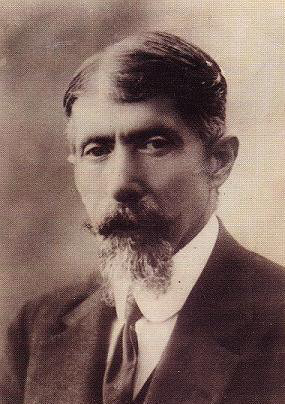
Qustaki al-Himsi, the founder of modern Arabic literary criticism

Aleppine writer Qustaki al-Himsi (1858–1941) is credited with having founded modern Arabic literary criticism, with one of his works, The researcher's source in the science of criticism.

An example of modern poetry in classical Arabic style with themes of Pan-Arabism is the work of Aziz Pasha Abaza. He came from Abaza family which produced notable Arabic literary figures including Fekry Pasha Abaza, Tharwat Abaza, and Desouky Bek Abaza, among others.

== Dissemination of ideas ==
=== Newspapers and journals ===
The first printing press in the Middle East was in the Monastery of Saint Anthony of Qozhaya in Lebanon and dates back to 1610. It printed books in Syriac and Garshuni (Arabic using the Syriac alphabet). The first printing press with Arabic letters was built in St John's monastery in Khinshara, Lebanon by "Al-Shamas Abdullah Zakher" in 1734. The printing press operated from 1734 till 1899.

In 1821, Muhammad Ali of Egypt brought the first printing press to Egypt. Modern printing techniques spread rapidly and gave birth to a modern Egyptian press, which brought the reformist trends of the Nahda into contact with the emerging Egyptian middle class of clerks and tradesmen.

In 1855, Rizqallah Hassun (1825–1880) founded the first newspaper written solely in Arabic, Mir'at al-ahwal. The Egyptian newspaper Al-Ahram founded by Saleem Takla dates from 1875, and between 1870 and 1900, Beirut alone saw the founding of about 40 new periodicals and 15 newspapers.

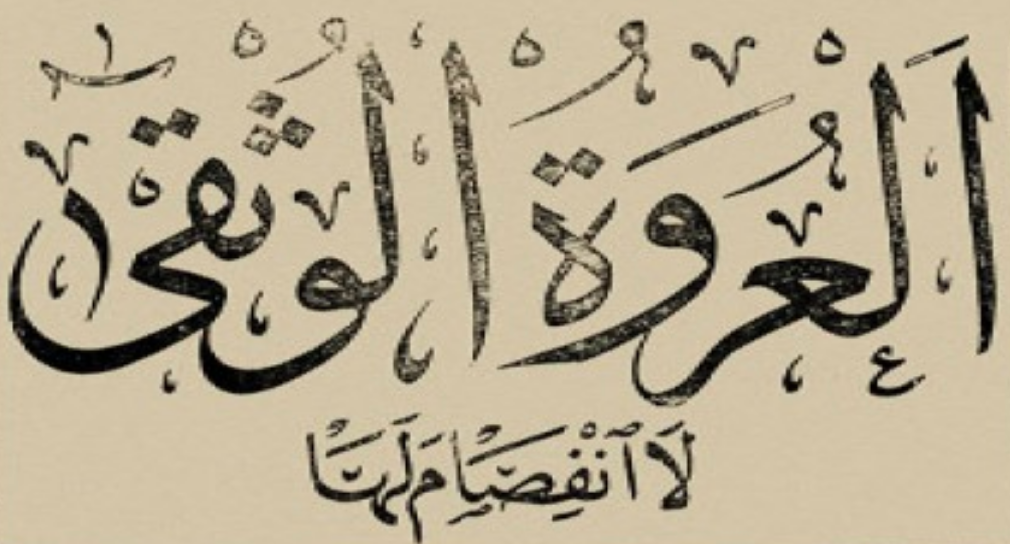
Despite colonial authorities' banning of Al-Urwah al-Wuthqa, it circulated widely in the Islamic world, from Morocco to India, disseminated through an elaborate network including Arab businessmen in Bombay.

Muhammad Abduh and Jamāl al-Dīn al-Afghānī's weekly pan-Islamic anti-colonial revolutionary literary magazine Al-Urwah al-Wuthqa (The Firmest Bond)—though it only ran from March to October 1884 and was banned by British authorities in Egypt and India—was circulated widely from Morocco to India and it's considered one of the first and most important publications of the Nahda.

=== Encyclopedias and dictionaries ===
The efforts at translating European and American literature led to the modernization of the Arabic language. Many scientific and academic terms, as well as words for modern inventions, were incorporated in modern Arabic vocabulary, and new words were coined in accordance with the Arabic root system to cover for others. The development of a modern press allowed mass literary engagement that transformed Classical Arabic into Modern Standard Arabic through the influence of spoken Arabic dialects. Modern Standard Arabic is the formal standard of Arabic used over the Arab world, though the distinction between the two varieties is fluid.

In the late 19th century, Butrus al-Bustani created the first modern Arabic encyclopedia, drawing both on medieval Arab scholars and Western methods of lexicography. Ahmad Rida (1872–1953) created the first modern dictionary of Arabic, Matn al-Lugha.

=== Literary salons ===
Different salons appeared. Maryana Marrash was the first Arab woman in the nineteenth century to revive the tradition of the literary salon in the Arab world, with the salon she ran in her family home in Aleppo. The first salon in Cairo was Princess Nazli Fadil's.

== See also ==
- Mahjar

== Sources ==
- Hourani, Albert (1983) [First published 1962]. Arabic Thought in the Liberal Age, 1798–1939 (2nd ed.). Cambridge University Press. ISBN 978-0-521-27423-4.
- Jayyusi, Salma Khadra (1977). Trends and Movements in Modern Arabic Poetry. Vol. I. Brill. ISBN 978-90-04-04920-8.
- Moreh, Shmuel (1976). Modern Arabic Poetry 1800–1970: the Development of its Forms and Themes under the Influence of Western Literature. Brill. ISBN 978-90-04-04795-2.
- Moreh, Shmuel (1988). Studies in Modern Arabic Prose and Poetry. Brill. ISBN 978-90-04-08359-2.
- Suleiman, Yasir (2003). The Arabic Language and National Identity: a Study in Ideology. Edinburgh University Press. ISBN 978-0-87840-395-0.
- Watenpaugh, Heghnar Zeitlian (2010). "The Harem as Biography: Domestic Architecture, Gender and Nostalgia in Modern Syria". In Booth, Marilyn (ed.). Harem Histories: Envisioning Places and Living Spaces. Duke University Press. ISBN 978-0822348580.
- Watenpaugh, Keith David (2006). Being Modern in the Middle East: Revolution, Nationalism, Colonialism, and the Arab Middle Class. Princeton University Press. ISBN 978-0691121697.
- Wielandt, Rotraud (1992). "Fransis Fathallah Marrashs Zugang zum Gedankengut der Aufklärung und der französischen Revolution". In van Gelder, Geert Jan; de Moor, Ed (eds.). The Middle East and Europe: Encounters and Exchanges (in German). Rodopi Publishers. ISBN 978-90-5183-397-3.
- Zachs, Fruma; Halevi, Sharon (2015). Gendering Culture in Greater Syria: Intellectuals and Ideology in the Late Ottoman Period. London and New York: I.B. Tauris. ISBN 978-1-78076-936-3.
