= Youssef Izz al-Din al-Samarrai =

Iraqi poet and academic

Youssef Izz Al-Din Al-Samarrai
- Born: 1922; Baqubah
- Died: April 8, 2013 (aged 90–91); Carmarthen
- Citizenship: Kingdom of Iraq, Iraq Republic, Ba'athist Iraq, Iraq
- Education: University of London and Alexandria University
- Occupations: Poet, novelist, literary historian
- Known for: Being a member of the Royal Society of Literature, Iraqi Academy of Sciences, Egyptian Institute, Arab Academy of Damascus

Youssef Izz al-Din Ahmad al-Samarrai (1922 – 8 April 2013) was an Iraqi poet and university professor. He was born and studied in the city of Baqubah. He worked as a primary teacher at the Primary Teacher's House, then joined the Faculty of Arts at Alexandria University where he obtained a BA in Arabic language and literature. Youssef Izz al-din has continued his studies there, receiving a master's degree, then a doctorate from the University of London. He was appointed as a teacher of modern Arabic literature at the College of Arts at the University of Baghdad. He was assigned to the iraqi scientific academy in 1961, then a general director of guidance at the ministry of culture. He was a member of the royal society of literature in London, and the scientific academy in Cairo, Damascus, Jordan, and Iraq. He has many poetry collections and a large number of books, studies and lectures that he delivered. He died in Britain.

== Biography ==
Dr. Youssef Ezz Al-Din Bin Al-Sayed Ahmed Al-Samarrai Al-Baqoubi (1922 – 8 April 2013) was an Arab writer and thinker and an important figure from among the prominent figures in Iraq and the contemporary Arabs. He had four children, Dr. Asel is a surgeon and university professor, Dr. Moel is a professor of sharia at the University of Wales and Qatar, Dr. Saad is an expert in geology, and Ms. Nada is a lecturer in management. His wife, Mrs. Khairiya Rasheed Al-Sabri, died on April 21, 2001. He is the brother of the manuscript scholar Dr. Qassem Al-Samarrai.

He began his literary life as a poet and playwright, then completed his literary studies and worked at the University of Baghdad and other Arabic universities. He held high positions in the field of culture and media (it was called propaganda and media at that time), and worked as Secretary of the Iraqi Scientific Academy, succeeding Dr. Naji Al-Aseel until his departure from Iraq in (1979). During which he continued his intellectual and literary research and published excerpts from his biography in more than one book. He also published the novels “Heart on Travel” and “The Emigrant Seagull” and a collection of stories (Three Virgins). In addition to his poetry collections and his critical and literary research. In (2001) he retired from university work as a result of his friend's insistence and his physical suffering. His wife died during that time. Before that, he was nearly eighty. Iraq's political conditions were still thorny at that time, and did not encourage him to return to his locked home in Adhamiya since he left. Among those equations, the choice of work and the atmosphere of brotherhood and love surrounded by his friends was more likely than others.

Youssef Ezz Al-Din bin Al-Sayed Ahmed bin Al-Sayed Abdul-Razzaq Al-Samarrai was born in Baqubah at the beginning of the third decade of the 20th century. He died in Carmarthen, Wales and was buried with his wife in the Muslim cemetery in Swansea, Wales. His father was an officer in the Ottoman army, and he participated in the battles of this army in Anatolia and Caucasus, as well as other wars that the Ottoman Empire fought against its enemies, even though the first war, 1914–1918, ended with the defeat of the Ottoman Empire. Some of the Iraqi and Arab officers who returned to their country, and it was known on the authority of his father, his generosity, fathers, and good morals, and he was called the master. The family used to live in the city of Samarra, and it ruled the guardians of the two sanctified kindergartens of the two venerable Imams Al-Hasan Al-Askari and Ali Al-Hadi. There is fierce bloodshed between the two parties, which prompted the governor of Baghdad, Daoud Pasha to prepare a military campaign to disengage, spare the blood of brothers and cousins, and punish the offenders. The family dispersed to various parts of Iraq, neighboring countries, and beyond. Some became Rajat in India, while others resided in Iran whenever he wanted. His ancestors lived in Diyala Brigade for a long period of time.

Youssef Ezz al-din began as a teacher in his 30s and early 40s in the villages of Diyala Governorate, then as a teacher between his 40s and early 50s in Baghdad. He then worked as a professor at the University of Baghdad between (1957-1978) and dean of postgraduate studies in the universities of the Emirates, Riyadh, and Taif (1979-2001). He also worked as a teacher and lecturer at the Institute of Graduate Studies at the Arab League during the 1960s. Professor Youssef Ezz Al-din contributed to building cultural and literary edifices in addition to his educational and university work, including establishing the public library in the city center of Baquba. During his work in primary education; The establishment of the Iraqi Writers and Authors Association, the establishment of Al-Kitab Magazine - the mouthpiece of the Iraqi Writers, and Authors Association, Establishment of the cultural pens magazine, which was included in the publications of the Iraqi Ministry of Culture; Supervising the management and organization of the works and facilities of the Iraqi Scientific Complex during the 60s and 70s, where he was the secretary of the complex during the secretariat of Naji Al-Aseel and then its general secretary until his departure from Iraq (1978). This confirms the active and active role in the Iraqi culture movement between the fifties and seventies of the last century, including festivals, seminars and cultural conferences, the Al-Kindi and Ibn Rushd festivals, Arab and international cultural, and scientific events. He was an active member of the Arabic Language Academy in Cairo, and he did not stop actively attending one of its courses until his last illness. Despite his preoccupations and the accumulation of his health and family burdens, he was keen to prepare two papers annually to participate in the sessions of the complex. He enjoyed the appreciation of the members of the complex, the Egyptian cultural community and the Egyptian press. He had clear positions and opinions on topics such as the renewal of the Arabic language, and foreign vocabulary in the Arabic language at the level of the media and the street. In addition to his work in the Iraqi Academic Academy (later Dar Al-Hikma Foundation) and his role in the Arabic Language Academy in Cairo, he was a member of the Language and Translation Academies in Damascus and Delhi and the Comparative Literature Associations in Britain, Canada, the United States, and elsewhere.

He resided in Wales after his retirement, continuing his writing and research, and re-reviewing and re-publishing some of his books. Among the most prominent of his recent books (political poetry in modern Iraq), the investigation of the book (Al-Rusafi tells his memories) which is one of the old manuscripts that date the last years of Al-Rusafi in his 40s. He reviewed and published it after investigating three copies between a manuscript and a partial publication. It turned out it was published and reproduced more than once, and it is the only book on the biography of the poet and thinker Al-Rasafi, especially after the publication of his unique book, The Personality of Muhammad, published by Dar al-Jamal in Germany. Youssef Izz has worked on a book entitled "Violence in Iraq", which deals with background of the events after the American invasion. He also completed his translation of the American Walt Whitman, which he had begun years before.

As one of his peers said, "The avenue of life was not furnished in front of him with roses or the red carpet... he tasted the bitterness of life, the hardship of life, the sterility of alienation, the sulking of many, and the treachery of time... the earth under his feet and the sky above him and his back to the wall...what drives a boy in his early twenties to quit playing and fooling around and go to write newspapers and regularly provide a newsletter about his city (Baqubah) in the thirties of the last century! He will be the youngest and first journalist in his quiet city on the banks of the winding Diyala River to meet the Tigris near Baghdad. When the British planes struck the cities and villages of Iraq in the wake of the blessed twenty-first revolution, he was forty days old, and he was (the son of the revolution that remained - with him - all his life), according to his expression, but he transformed the revolution into thought, literature and love, so his revolution spread from the gardens of Baqubah to overflow beyond the borders of Iraq to the country of the English (especially) and the whole world."

His wife died in 2000 and then he retired from his university work in 2000. After three years of illness, he died on 8 April 2013.

== Publications ==
=== Poetry ===
- In the Conscience of Time poetry collection 1950 - Alexandria
- Composed by poetry collection 1953 - Alexandria
- Life's breath poetry collection 1960 - Beirut
- From the journey of life poetry collection 1967 - Baghdad
- Folded Whispers of Love Poetry poetry collection 1987 - Cairo
- Echo of Taif poetry collection 1992 - Al-Taif
- Drinking salt poem 1992 – Cairo
- The confused melody poem 1992 - Cairo
- Days were lost poem 1992 – Cairo
- The pains of a poet's poem poem 1993 – Cairo
- He does not know his fate poem 1994 - Cairo
- The echo came back poem 1994 - Cairo
- Wafaa Al-Hassan poetry play 1994 - Cairo
- Nostalgia Whisper poetry collection 1997 - Cairo
- So, Baghdad! poetry collection 2001 - Cairo

=== Narratives ===
- Heart on Travel 1975 – Cairo
- Three Virgins, a collection of stories 1987 – Riyadh
- The Migrant Seagull 1992 – Cairo
- The memory returned with its oddities and anecdotes (the days of high school) 1988 - Cairo
- To Forbidden Homes (China and the Soviet Union) 1989 – Cairo 21- Sweet and Bitter Memories (His Story) 1992 – Cairo

=== Literary studies ===
- Iraqi Poetry in the 19th Century- Its Characteristics and Objectives 1958 – Baghdad
- Modern Iraqi Poetry and Political and Social Currents 1960 - Baghdad
- Khairy Al Hindawi - His Life and Poetry 1965 - Baghdad
- In Modern Arabic Literature (Yahout and Articles Criticisms) 1967 - Baghdad
- Socialism and nationalism and their impact on modern Arabic poetry 1968 - Cairo
- Iraq's poets in the twentieth century- part 1 1969 - Baghdad
- The novel in Iraq- its development and the impact of thought on it 1973 - Cairo
- The story in Iraq - its roots and development 1974 - Cairo
- Ibrahim Saleh Shukr- and early modern prose in Iraq 1975 - Cairo
- A saying in criticism and modernity of literature 1978 - Riyadh
- Chapters in modern literature and criticism 1981 - Riyadh
- Renewal in modern poetry - its psychological motives and intellectual roots 1986 - Jeddah
- Between Modernity and Conservatism - A Critical Study of Contemporary Poetry 1990 - ....
- The Impact of Arabic Literature on the Path of Western Literature 1990 - Riyadh
- Critical opinions that survived the valley 1992 - Cairo
- Old does not die and new does not live - Critical opinions Aha in Modernity and Literature) 1996 - Cairo
- A manuscript of the poetry of Al-Akhras d. T.

=== Intellectual issues ===
- One of the pioneers of modern thought in Iraq - Fahmy al-Modarres 1969 – Cairo
- The development of modern thought 1976- Baghdad/ Iraq 41 – Issues from Arab thought 1978 - Cairo
- Civilizational challenge and intellectual invasion 1405 AH- Riyadh/ Saudi Arabia 43- Our Heritage and Contemporary 1987 – Cairo

=== Date ===
- Daoud Pasha and the end of the Mamluks in Iraq 1967 – Baghdad
- Arabic manuscripts in Sophia National Library 1968 – Baghdad
- Al-Nusra in Basra News (investigation) 1969 – Baghdad

=== Other language publications ===
- Poetry and Iraqi Society: 1900–1945 1962 - Baghdad
- Modern Iraqi Poetry, Social and Influences 1971 - Cairo
- Songs from Baghdad to London 1984
- La Spontaneite by Drya Najm, 1986 - Cairo
