= Nadra Haddad =

Syrian-American poet

- ندرة حداد
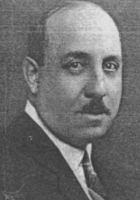
- Born: October 30, 1881; Homs, Ottoman Syria
- Died: May 27, 1950 (aged 68); New York City, United States
- Occupations: Writer, journalist
- Relatives: Abd al-Masih Haddad (brother); Jerrier A. Haddad (nephew)

Nadra Haddad (Arabic: ندرة حداد; 30 October 1881 – 27 May 1950) was a Syrian poet, and a founding member of The Pen League, the first Arabic-language literary society in North America.

== Early life ==
Nadra was born on 30 October 1881 in Homs in Ottoman Syria to Rashid Haddad, a Syrian intellectual. He received his primary education at the city’s Greek Orthodox community school, and worked as a bookkeeper, before emigrating on 26 December 1897 to the United States while 17.

Haddad settled in New York City, and worked in commerce, all the while writing poetry. He worked as chief editor of the Arabic language publication As-Sayeh (Arabic: السايح, "The Tourist"), that his brother Abdelmasih started. He later worked in banking.

== Works ==
Haddad is a founding member of The Pen League, the first Arabic-language literary society in North America. The league was formed initially by Nasib Arida and by Nadra’s brother Abd al-Masih in 1916, and subsequently re-formed in 1920 by a larger group of Mahjari writers in New York led by Gibran Khalil Gibran.

Haddad’s best known work is Diwan Awraq Al-Khareef (The book of Autumn Leaves).

== Death ==
Haddad died of a heart attack on 27 May 1950 during a wedding ceremony, after he had recited a poem congratulating the newlyweds.

== Personal life ==
Nadra married Hadbo Haddad and fathered three children, Robert, William, and Josette.
