= The Book of Mirdad =

1948 book by Mikha'il Na'ima

- Author: Mikha'il Na'ima
- Original title: The Book of Mirdad: The Strange Story of a Monastery which was Once Called The Ark
- Language: English
- Genre: Philosophical fiction
- Publication date: 1948
- Publication place: Lebanon

The Book of Mirdad is an allegorical book of philosophy by Lebanese author Mikha'il Na'ima. The book was first published in Lebanon in 1948 and was initially written in English, with Na'ima later translating it into Arabic. Na'ima initially sought to have the book published in London, where it was rejected for "[advancing] a religion with 'a new dogma'".

In 1973 the book was adapted into a three-act play by Padukone Ramanand.

== Synopsis ==
The book is presented as a series of dialogues between Mirdad, the abbot of a monastery, and his disciples. The Book of Mirdad draws on a variety of philosophies, including that of Leo Tolstoy and Sufi Islam. Through the allegories in the book presented by Mirdad, Na'ima presents several themes and calls for the unity of different people groups in universal love, as well as criticizing materialism and empty religious rituals.

Mirdad's dialogs gives out teachings which show us how it is possible to transform our consciousness and uncover the God within, by dissolving our sense of duality.

== Reception ==
A reviewer for Philosophy East and West praised the book, citing Na'ima's "power of enthusiasm and persuasion" as a highlight. The Indian god-man Osho mentioned The Book of Mirdad in his book A Song Without Words, saying that it "can be of immense help if you don't expect, and it is a book worth reading thousands of times." Osho has also mentioned that this book is the only book that has been successful in being written and if one fails to understand it, the failure is that of the reader and not the author's.

The book has been compared to John Bunyan's The Pilgrim's Progress in that both stories are largely allegorical. The Book of Mirdad has also been compared to Ameen Rihani's The Book of Khalid, with the book being believed to have had an influence on Na'ima's writings. Na'ima has described the work as the "pinnacle of his thought and a summary of his view of life".
