= Jerrier A. Haddad =

American pioneer computer engineer

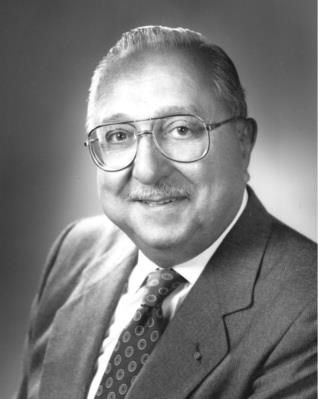
- Jerry Haddad
- Born: July 17, 1922; Brooklyn, New York, U.S.
- Died: March 31, 2017 (aged 94); Tupper Lake, U.S.
- Education: Cornell University
- Occupation: Computer engineer
- Spouse: Margaret Van Hamlin Haddad
- Children: 5
- Parent(s): Abd al-Masih Haddad; Rashida Helen Shaker
- Relatives: Nadra Haddad (uncle)

Jerrier A. "Jerry" Haddad (July 17, 1922 – March 31, 2017) was an American pioneer computer engineer who was the co-developer and designer of the IBM 701 series which was IBM's first commercial scientific computer and its first mass-produced mainframe computer.

The IBM 701 started the line of IBM 700/7000 series which were responsible for bringing electronic computing to the world and for IBM's dominance in the mainframe computer market during the 1960s and 1970s that continues today. The lower-cost general-purpose version of the IBM 701 was the famous IBM 650, which became the first mass-produced computer in the world.

Haddad was responsible for engineering and both system and circuit-level design, and managed the approximately 200 engineers involved. In 1984, along with Nathaniel Rochester, he received the Computer Pioneer Award.

Haddad was also the co-developer of the IBM 604, the world's first mass-produced programmable electronic calculator, along with Ralph Palmer.

He was a fellow of both the Institute of Electrical and Electronics Engineers and the American Association for the Advancement of Science, and was a member of the National Academy of Engineering.

== Biography ==
Haddad was born in New York City, to a family of Syrian and Lebanese origin, his father was the writer and journalist Abd al-Masih Haddad. He received a Bachelor of Science in electrical engineering, Cornell University, 1945. He studied in the Advanced Business Management Program at Harvard Business School in 1958. Haddad lived in Briarcliff Manor, New York, with his wife and five children.

Haddad was the co-developer of the IBM 604, the world's first mass-produced programmable electronic calculator, and jointly directed the IBM 701 electronic defense calculator program with Nathaniel Rochester. Haddad was the vice president of technical personnel development when he retired from IBM in 1981. Haddad held 18 patents for inventions in the computer and electronics fields.

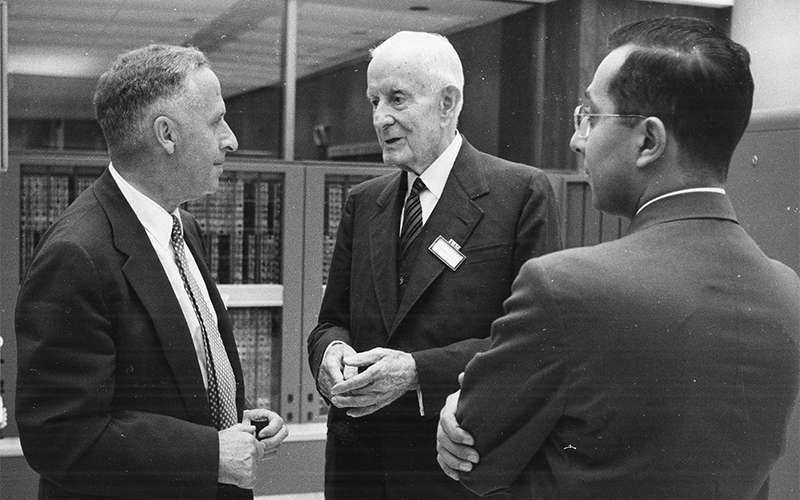
Haddad (r), Thomas J. Watson Sr. (c), in 1955

Honors and Awards:

- Member, National Academy of Engineering, 1968
- Recipient, Order of the Cedars Medal, Lebanon, 1970
- Honorary Doctorate of Sciences, Union College, 1971
- Honorary Doctorate of Sciences, Clarkson College, 1978
- Institute of Electrical and Electronics Engineers (IEEE) Computer Pioneer Award, 1984
- Fellow, IEEE
- Fellow, American Association for the Advancement of Science
