= Suleyman al-Boustani =

- سليمان البـسـتاني
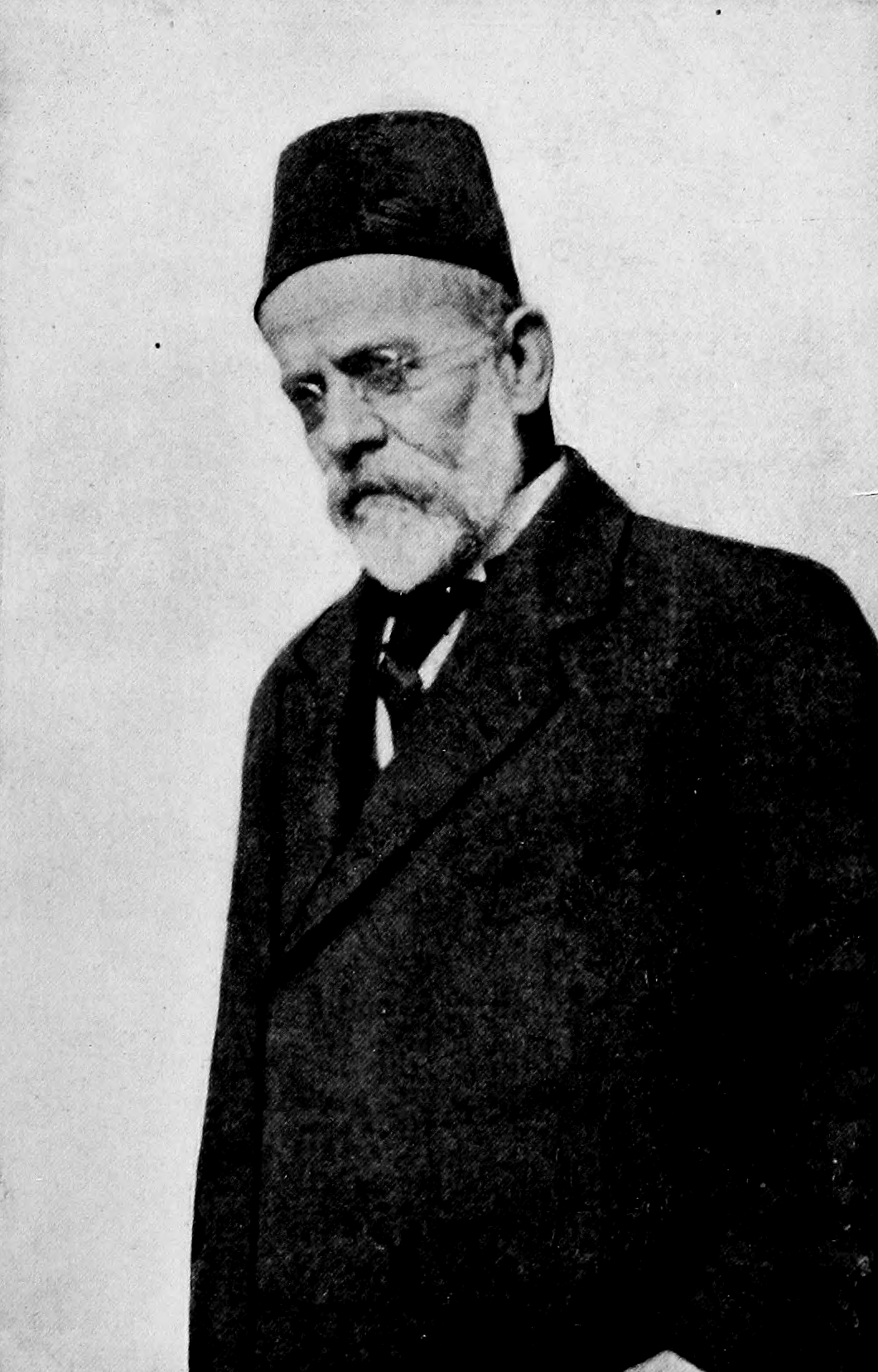
- Born: May 22, 1856; Bkheshtin, Lebanon
- Died: June 1, 1925 (aged 69)
- Occupations: Statesman, teacher, poet, historian

Suleyman al-Boustani (Arabic: سليمان البـسـتاني / ALA-LC: Sulaymān al-Bustānī, Turkish: Süleyman el-Büstani; 22 May 1856– 1 June 1925) was a statesman, teacher, poet and historian born in Bkheshtin, Lebanon.

He was a Maronite Catholic and hailed from a prominent family well known for their pioneering contributions to the Arab renaissance of the late 19th century known as Nahda.

A nephew of Butrus al-Bustani, he was famous for translating Homer's Iliad into Arabic, introducing its poetic style into the Arabic language. His political front saw him as the minister of finance in the last Ottoman government before its collapse.
