= Sasson Somekh =

Israeli academic

- ששון סומך
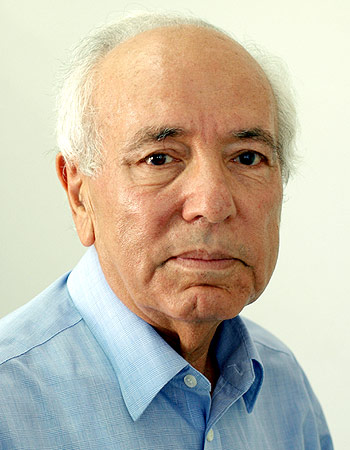
- Born: September 21, 1933; Baghdad, Iraq
- Died: August 18, 2019 (aged 86); Tel Aviv, Israel
- Awards: Israel Prize

Academic background
- Education: Tel Aviv University; Hebrew University

Academic work
- Main interests: Modern Arab literature

Sasson Somekh (Hebrew: ששון סומך; Arabic: ساسون سوميخ) (1933 – 18 August 2019) was an Iraqi-Israeli academic, writer and translator. He was professor emeritus of Modern Arab Literature at Tel Aviv University.

== Biography ==
Sasson Somekh was born in Baghdad to a secular Jewish family. In 1951, Somekh and his family immigrated to Israel. He did not know Hebrew at the time, but started learning it in earnest in order to achieve his goal of becoming a translator of Arabic poetry into Hebrew. His first translation was published in 1954 in Ner, a journal published by Ihud ("Unity"), an association dedicated to the advancement of Arab–Jewish reconciliation established by Judah Magnes.

== Academic career ==
Somekh earned a Bachelor's degree in Hebrew Language and History from Tel Aviv University, and a Master's degree in Linguistics of Semitic languages at the Hebrew University of Jerusalem. In 1962–1965, Somekh served as scientific secretary of the Academy of the Hebrew Language. He did his doctorate at Oxford University in 1966–1968. His subject was the novels of Naguib Mahfouz, concentrating on the Cairo Trilogy. Over the years Mahfouz and Somekh became friends. The thesis supervisor was Egyptian scholar Mustafa Badawi.

Upon his return to Israel he became a lecturer in Arabic Literature. He served as chairman of the Arabic Language and Literature department at Tel Aviv University in 1972–1984. In 1980, he became a full professor. Between 1982 and 2003, he held the Helmos Chair for Arabic Literature. In 1996–1998 he was head of the Israel Academic Center in Cairo. He was a visiting professor at Princeton University, St Antony's College, Oxford, Annenberg Research Institute, NYU and Uppsala University. In 2004, he received an honorary doctorate from Ben Gurion University.

He is among the founders of the Academy of the Arabic Language in Israel, established in December 2007 in collaboration with several former students.

== Publishing ==
Somekh wrote ten books, many translations from Arabic to Hebrew, among which are four anthologies of modern Arabic poetry, and about 90 articles in academic journals. Over the past 50 years Somekh published hundreds of articles in literary magazines and supplements such as Iton 77, Halikon and Moznayim. His articles deal mainly with modern Arabic literature and writers, connections between Arabic and Hebrew literature and the Cairo Geniza. He was a regular contributor to the newspaper Haaretz.

=== Autobiography: Bagdad Yesterday ===
At the age of 70, Somekh wrote the first volume of his autobiography, Baghdad, Yesterday: The Making of an Arab Jew. The book was published in Hebrew and has been translated into Arabic, English and Turkish. In the book he describes his life as a Jewish child and teenager in Baghdad during the first 17 years of his life. He speaks of being a secular Jewish child from a secular Jewish home. He shows that the educated middle class that achieved prominence in the 1930s and '40s was the main influence on the norms of life in the Jewish community. Also, he depicts the Jews of Iraq enjoying neighborly relations with their Muslim neighbors - perhaps not idyllic but of mutual respect.

The second volume, Yamim Hazuyim ("Call it Dreaming") was published in 2008. It describes his life between Tel Aviv, Oxford, Princeton, and Cairo between 1951 and 2000. The book moves between the four major stations of his life: Tel Aviv - where he lived and worked for 40 years as a professor of Arabic literature; Oxford - where he received his PhD; Princeton - where he was occasionally a visiting professor in the 1970s and '80s; and Cairo - the city in which he did much literary research and where he headed the Israel Academic Center.

== Awards and recognition ==
- 1982: Arberry Prize for the study of Arabic literature, awarded by Pembroke College, Cambridge
- 2005: Israel Prize, for Middle Eastern studies.
- 2008: EMET Prize in the category culture and arts

== Published works in English ==
=== Books ===
- Life after Baghdad: memoirs of an Arab-Jew in Israel, 1950-2000, Sussex: Sussex Academic Press, 2012, ISBN 978-1-84519-502-1.
- Baghdad, Yesterday: The Making of an Arab Jew, Jerusalem: Ibis Edition, 2007, ISBN 978-9659012589.
- Genre and language in modern Arabic literature, Wiesbaden: Otto Harrassowitz, 1991, ISBN 3-447-03133-6.
- The Changing Rhythm: A Study of Najib Mahfuz's Novels, Leiden: Brill, 1973, ISBN 9789004035874.

=== Articles ===
- "The Sad Millenarian: An Examination of Awlad Haratina", Middle Eastern Studies 7, 49-61, 1971
- "Two Versions of Dialogue in Mahmud Taymur's Drama", Princeton Near East Paper No. 21, Princeton, 1975
- "Language and Theme in the Short Stories of Yusuf Idris", Journal of Arabic Literature 4, 89-100, 1975
- "The Transformation of 'Ghalwa", Journal of Arabic Literature 6 (1976), 101-119
- " The Diglotic Dilemma in the Drama of Tawfiq al-Hakim", Israel Oriental Studies 9, 392-403, 1983
- "The Function of Sound in the Stories of Yusuf Idris", Journal of Arabic Literature 16, 95-104, 1985
- "The Participation of Egyptian Jews in Modern Arabic Culture", The Jews of Egypt in Modern Times, Shimon Shamir (ed.), Boulder: Westview, 130-140, 1986
- "A Minute to Midnight: War and Peace in the Novels of Naguib Mahfouz", Middle East Review 20:2, 7-19, 1987
- "Shelley in Neoclassical Arabic", Edebiyat, NS, Vol. I, No.2, 89-100, 1989
- "Modern Arabic Poetry and its Medieval Palimpsest", Edebiyat, NS, 3:1, 105-118, 1989
- "Cold, Tall Houses: The Jewish Neighbor in the Works of Arab Authors", Jerusalem Quarterly 52, 26-35, 1989
- "Lost Voices: Jewish Authors in Modern Arabic Literature", in Jews Among Arabs: Contact and Boundaries, Mark R. Cohen and Abraham L. Udovitch (eds.), Princeton: Darwin Press, 9-20, 1989
- "The Essence of Naguib Mahfouz", The Tel-Aviv Review 2, 244-257, 1990
- (with Mark R. Cohen), "In the Court of Ya'qub Ibn Killis: A Fragment from the Cairo Geniza", Jewish Quarterly Review 80, 283-314, 1990
- "The Neo-Classical Arabic Poets", in Modern Arabic Literature, Cambridge History of Arabic Literature, M.M. Badawi (ed.), Cambridge: CUP, 26-81, 1992
- "Colloquialized Fusha in Modern Arabic Prose Fiction", Jerusalem Studies in Arabic and Islam 16, 176-194, 1993
- "Structure of Silence: A Reading of Yusuf's Idris's 'Bayt Min Lahm'", Writer, Culture, Text: Studies in Modern Arabic Literature, Ami Elad (ed.) Frediction: York Press, 56-61, 1993
- "Biblical Echoes in Modern Arabic Literature", Journal of Arabic Literature 26, 186-200, 1995
- "Vestiges of Saadia's Tafsir in Modern Arabic Bibles", Judaism and Islam: Boundaries, Communication and Interaction: Essays in Honor of William M. Brinner, B. Hary, F. Aster, J. Hayes (eds.), Leiden: Brill, 227-236, 2000

== See also ==
- List of Israel Prize recipients
- Iraqi Jews
- Arab Jews
- Literature of Israel
