= Muhammad Mustafa Badawi =

Egyptian literary scholar (1925–2012)

- محمد مصطفى بدوي
- Born: 10 June 1925; Alexandria, Egypt
- Died: 19 April 2012 (aged 86); Oxford, United Kingdom

Academic background
- Education: University of London
- Thesis: Coleridge: Critic of Shakespeare

Academic work
- Discipline: English and Arabic literature
- Notable students: Sasson Somekh, Roger Allen (translator)

Mohammed Mustafa Badawi (Arabic: محمد مصطفى بدوي, ALA-LC: Muḥammad Muṣṭafá Badawī; 10 June 1925 – 19 April 2012) was a scholar of English and Arabic literature. He was a Research Fellow of St. Antony's College at the University of Oxford from 1967 to 1969, and was then elected to the College's Governing Body. Upon retirement in 1992, he became an Emeritus Fellow.

Badawi was born in Egypt in 1925. He received as PhD at the University of London in 1954, with a thesis on Coleridge's criticism of Shakespeare, later published in 1973 by Cambridge University Press as Coleridge: Critic of Shakespeare which was re-printed in 2010; according to WorldCat, the book is held in 554 libraries. He then became Assistant Professor of English at the University of Cairo and moved to Oxford University in 1964, where he lectured at Brasenose College until retirement in 1992. He became a fellow of St. Antony's College (1967-2012), where he was the first lecturer in Modern Arabic at the new Middle East Centre of the college.

Badawi's notable students include: Emeritus Professor Sasson Somekh of Tel Aviv University and Dr. Roger Allen of the University of Pennsylvania

He published over thirty-six books in the course of his academic career including studies of English literature and modern Arabic literature, as well as translations of Arabic literature into English. Upon his retirement he was awarded the King Faisal International Prize in Arabic Literature.

He left an endowment at Oxford University for the payment of the "Mustafa Badawi Prize in Modern Arabic Literature" which is awarded for "the best English essay on some aspect of modern Arabic literature of up to 15,000 words." which demonstrated, "sensitivity to modern Arabic literary texts as well as some originality and skill in critical analysis."

Upon his retirement, a festschrift in his honour was published as a special issue of Journal of Arabic literature

== Bibliography ==
=== Academic works ===
- A Short History of Modern Arabic Literature. Oxford [England]: Clarendon Press, 1993.
- (ed.) Modern Arabic Literature. Cambridge [England]: Cambridge University Press, 1992. ISBN 9780521331975
- Early Arabic Drama. Cambridge [Cambridgeshire]: Cambridge University Press, 1988. ISBN 9780521344272
- Modern Arabic Drama in Egypt. Cambridge: Cambridge University Press, 1987. ISBN 9780521020732
- Modern Arabic Literature and the West. London: Ithaca Press for the Board of the Faculty of Oriental Studies, University of Oxford, 1985.
- (with Beeston, A. F. L., Julia Ashtiany, Maria Rosa Menocal, Raymond P. Scheindlin, Michael Anthony Sells, Roger Allen, and D. S. Richards.) The Cambridge History of Arabic Literature. Cambridge: Cambridge University Press, 1983
- Background to Shakespeare. London: Macmillan, 1981.
  - Translated into Japanese by Kenryū Kawauchi; Hideo Kaneya as シェイクスピアとその背景 / Shieikusupia to sono haikei OCLC 673912201
- A Critical Introduction to Modern Arabic Poetry. Cambridge: Cambridge University Press. 1975. ISBN 0-521-20699-5. "based on lectures delivered at different times at the University of Oxford."
- Coleridge: Critic of Shakespeare. Cambridge [Eng.]: University Press, 1973. ISBN 9780521200400

=== Translations into English ===
- Naguib Mahfouz, The thief and the dogs; translated from the Arabic by Trevor Le Gassick and M.M. Badawi. New York : Doubleday, 1984
- Ḥaqqī, Yaḥyá, The Saint's Lamp and Other Stories. Leiden: Brill, 1973

=== Translations into Arabic ===
- Fīlīb lārkīn: Muḫtārāt šiʿriyya. Philip Larkin: Selection. Al-Majlis al-A'lami li-l-Thaqafa, 1998.

=== Other ===
- “Shakespeare and the Arabs” lecture on the occasion of the quadricentennial in 1964, later published in Cairo Studies in English, 1964/65,
- (ed.) أطلال ؛ ورسائل من لندن / Aṭlāl : wa-Rasāʼil min Landan (two poetry collections)
- An anthology of modern Arabic verse selected with an introduction by M.M. Badawi. [London]: Published for the trustees of the James Mew Fund by Oxford University Press, 1970. (in Arabic, with English notes). ISBN 9780199200320
