= Nasib Arida =

Syrian-born poet and writer (1887–1946)

- نسيب عريضة
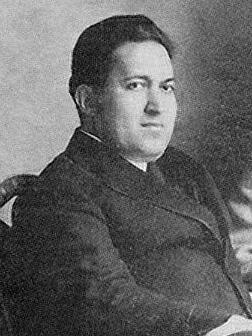
- Arida in 1920
- Born: 1887; Homs, Ottoman Syria
- Died: 1946 (aged 58–59); New York City, United States
- Occupations: Writer, poet

Nasib Arida (Arabic: نسيب عريضة, ALA-LC: Nasīb ʻArīḍah; 1887–1946) was a Syrian-born poet and writer of the Mahjar movement and a founding member of the New York Pen League.

== Life ==
Arida was born in Homs to a Syrian Greek Orthodox family where he received his education until his immigration to the United States in 1905. In New York City, Arida started working in retail and writing for Al-Hoda and Meraat-ul-Gharb. Arida later married Najeeba Haddad, the sister of fellow Homs-born writers Abd al-Masih Haddad and Nadra Haddad; the couple would not have children, but would raise the daughter of another Haddad brother after the latter's wife's death in childbirth.

In 1913, Arida founded Al-Funoon, which was "the first attempt at an exclusively literary and artistic magazine by the Arab immigrant community in New York." In 1915 or 1916 along with Abd al-Masih Haddad he co-founded the Pen League in New York, an Arabic-language literary society, later joined by Kahlil Gibran, Mikha'il Na'ima and other Mahjari poets in 1920. He had one collection of poems, Perplexed Spirits (الأرواح الحائرة), published in 1946. He died the same year.

Similar to other Syro-Lebanese writers and intellectuals of his time, Arida opposed the Ottoman rule on Syria and repression of Syrian nationalism. He lamented that the Syrian people were slow to act or protest, as in the following poem:

No, by my God a heartless people receive only death as a gift.
Let history turn a page of failure and settle its accounts.
Perhaps rage, perhaps shame, perhaps fire may move the heart of a coward.
All these are in us, but all they move is the tongue.

== Sources ==
- Bawardi, Hani J. (2015). The Making of Arab Americans: From Syrian Nationalism to U.S. Citizenship (1st ed.). Texas: University of Texas Press. ISBN 978-1-47730-752-6.
- Bushrui, Suheil (1987). Kahlil Gibran of Lebanon. Smythe. ISBN 9780861402793.
- Haiek, Joseph R. (1984). Arab-American Almanac. News Circle Publishing House. ISBN 978-0-915652-21-1.
- Jayyusi, Salma Khadra; Tingley, Christopher (1977). Trends and Movements in Modern Arabic Poetry. Brill. ISBN 9789004049208.
- Meisami, Julie Scott; Starkey, Paul, eds. (1998). Encyclopedia of Arabic Literature. Vol. 1. Routledge. ISBN 9780415185714.
- Popp, Richard Alan (2001). "Al-Rābiṭah al-Qalamīyah, 1916". Journal of Arabic Literature. 32 (1). Brill: 30–52. doi:10.1163/157006401X00123. JSTOR 4183426.
