= Mikhail Naimy =

Lebanese writer and philosopher (1889–1988)

- ميخائيل نعيمة
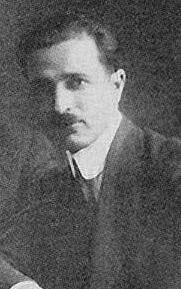
- Born: October 17, 1889; Baskinta, Mount Lebanon Mutasarrifate
- Died: February 28, 1988 (aged 98); Beirut, Lebanon
- Occupation: Writer
- Writing career
- Genre: Poetry
- Notable work: The Book of Mirdad
- Movement: Mahjar

Mikha'il Nu'ayma (Arabic: ميخائيل نعيمة, ALA-LC: Mīkhāʼīl Nuʻaymah; US legal name: Michael Joseph Naimy), better known in English by his pen name Mikhail Naimy (October 17, 1889 – February 28, 1988), was a Lebanese poet, novelist, and philosopher, famous for his spiritual writings, notably The Book of Mirdad. He is widely recognized as one of the most important figures in modern Arabic literature and one of the most important spiritual writers of the 20th century.

In 1920, Naimy re-formed the New York Pen League, along with its original founders Nasib Arida and Abd al-Masih Haddad, and other Mahjari literary figures such as Kahlil Gibran.

== Biography ==
Naimy was born into a Greek Orthodox family and completed his elementary education at the Baskinta school. He then studied at the Russian Teachers' Institute in Nazareth and the Theological Seminary in Poltava. He moved to the United States in 1911, joining his two older brothers in Walla Walla, Washington, where they owned a furniture store. He then moved to Seattle to study at the University of Washington, earning degrees in law and liberal arts. After his graduation in 1916 he moved to New York City, and in 1918 he was drafted in the U. S. Army.

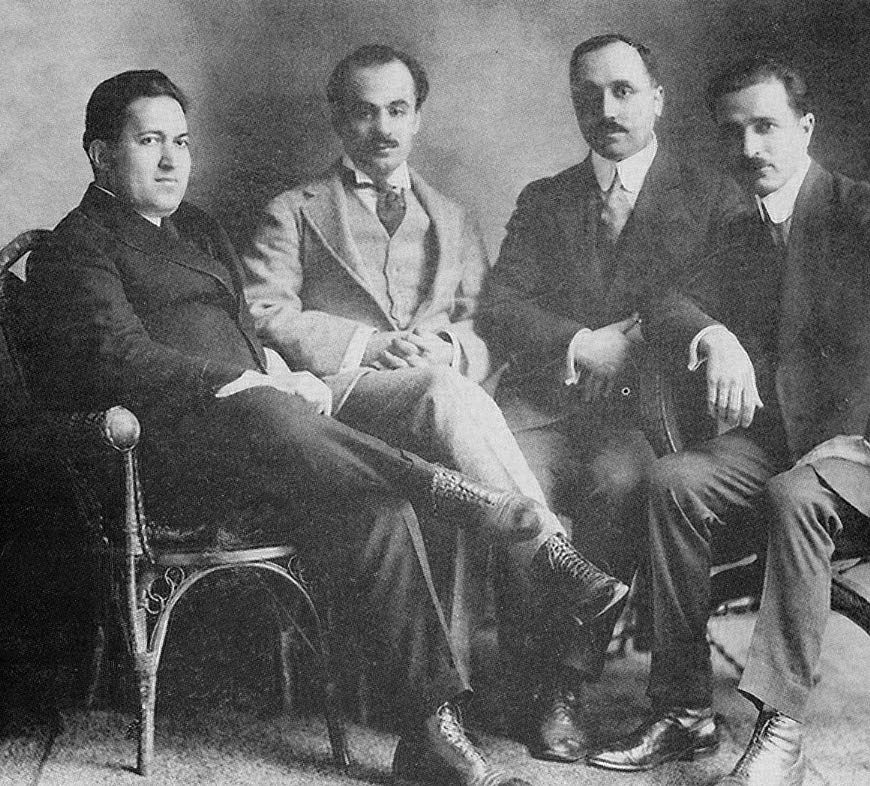
Four members of the Pen League in 1920. Left to right: Nasib Arida, Kahlil Gibran, Abd al-Masih Haddad, and Na'ima

After the war, Naimy returned for a time to Walla Walla, where he began his writing career in 1919. He wrote poetry in Russian, Arabic and English. He then moved back to New York, where he joined with Khalil Gibran and eight other writers to form a movement for the rebirth of Arabic literature, the New York Pen League. Gibran was its president and Naimy its secretary. In 1932, having lived in the States for 21 years, Naimy returned to Baskinta, where he lived for the rest of his life. He died of pneumonia at the age of 98 on February 28, 1988, in Beirut.

The mystic Osho had this to say about The Book of Mirdad: "There are millions of books in the world but The Book of Mirdad stands out far above any book in existence".

== Selected works ==
=== Arabic works ===
==== Poetry ====
- Hams al-jufūn, 1928.

==== Drama ====
- Al-ʾābāʾ wa-l-banūn, 1918.

==== Short stories ====
- Kān mā Kān, 1932;
- ʾAkābir, 1953;
- ʾAbū Baṭṭa, 1957.

==== Novels ====
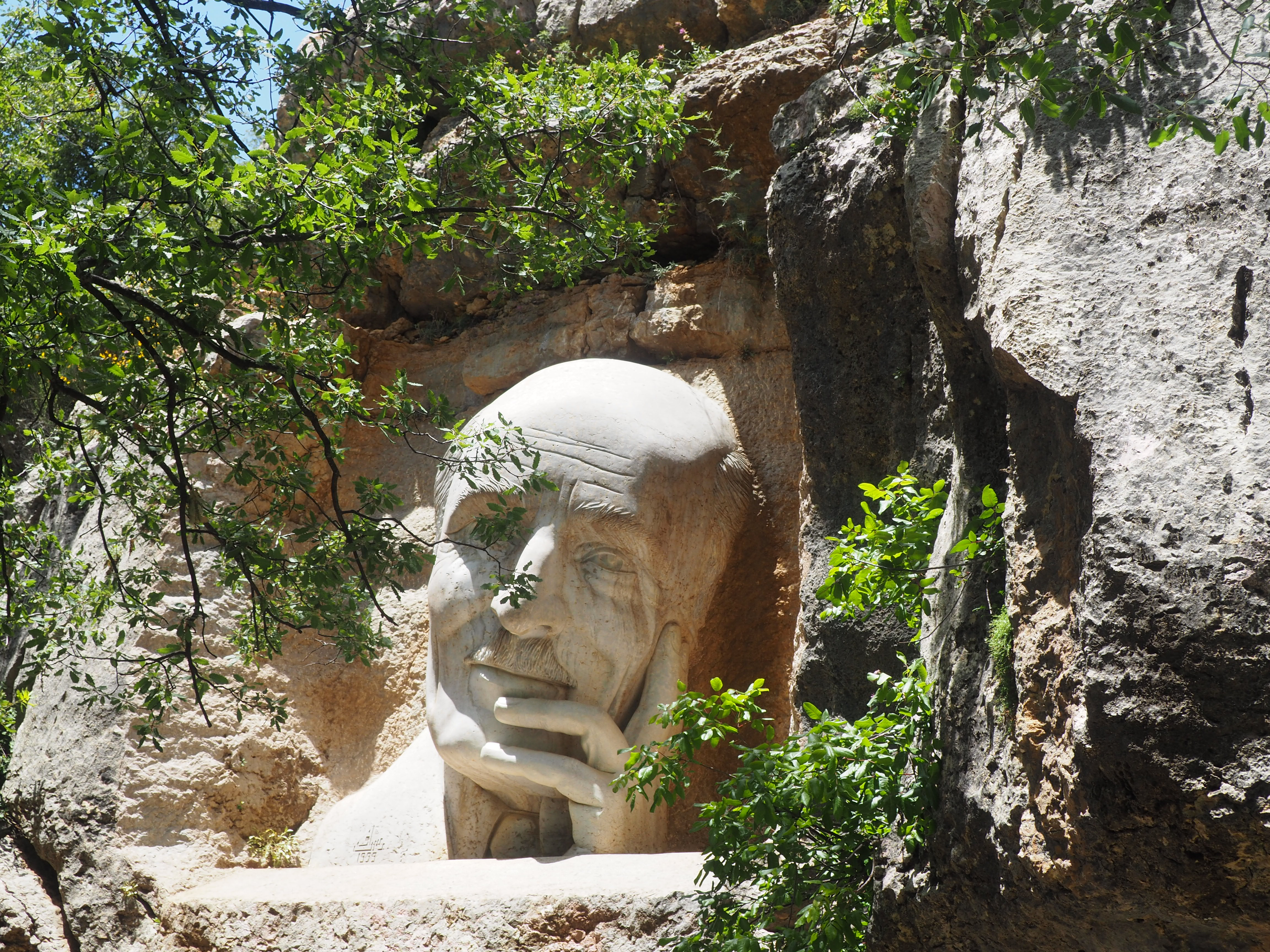
Mikhail Naïmy's Mausoleum in his hometown, Baskinta.

- Mudhakkirāt al-ʾArqaš, 1948 (author's trans. The Memoirs of a Vagrant Soul or the Pitted Face, 1952).

==== Autobiography ====
- Sabʿūn: ḥikāyat ʿumr, 1959–1960.

==== Criticism and biography ====
- Al-Ghirbal, 1923;
- Jibrān Khalīl Jibrān, 1936 (author's trans. Kahlil Gibran: A Biography,1950).

=== English works ===
- The Book of Mirdad, Beirut, 1948.

== Critical essays on Na'ima ==
(from the MLA database, March 2008)

1. Abbe, Susan. "Word Length Distribution in Arabic Letters." Journal of Quantitative Linguistics 2000 Aug; 7 (2): 121–27.
2. Bell, Gregory J. Theosophy, Romanticism and Love in the Poetry of Mikhail Naimy. Dissertation Abstracts International, Section A: The Humanities and Social Sciences, 2002 May; 62 (11): 3804. U of Pennsylvania, 2001.
3. Poeti arabi a New York. Il circolo di Gibran, introduzione e traduzione di F. Medici, prefazione di A. Salem, Palomar, Bari 2009.
4. Boullata, Issa J. "Mikhail Naimy: Poet of Meditative Vision." Journal of Arabic Literature 1993 July; 24 (2): 173–84.
5. El-Barouki, Foazi. "How Arab Émigré Writers in America Kept Their Cultural Roots." Dialog on Language Instruction 1997; 12 (1–2): 31–36.
6. Najjar, Nada. "Mikhael Naimy (1889-1988)." Aljadid: A Review & Record of Arab Culture and Arts 2000 Summer; 6 (32): 27.
7. Nijland, Cornelis. "Religious Motifs and Themes in North American Mahjar Poetry." Representations of the Divine in Arabic Poetry. Ed. Gert Borg and Ed De Moor. Amsterdam, Netherlands: Rodopi; 2001. pp. 161–81

== See also ==
- List of Arab American writers
- Lebanon#Literature
- New York Pen League
