= Shmuel Moreh =

Israeli academic and writer

- שמואל מורה
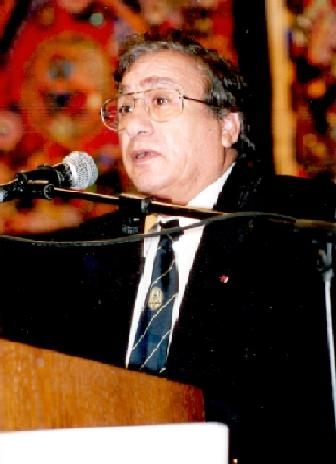
- Born: December 22, 1932; Baghdad, Iraq
- Died: September 22, 2017 (aged 84)
- Awards: Israel Prize in Middle Eastern studies (1999)

Shmuel Moreh (Hebrew: שמואל מורה; December 22, 1932 – September 22, 2017) was a professor of Arabic language and literature at the Hebrew University of Jerusalem and a recipient of the Israel Prize in Middle Eastern studies in 1999. He authored numerous books and articles on Arabic literature, with particular attention to Iraqi Jewish Arabic literature, and was a contributor to Elaph, the first independent online daily journal in the Arabic language. Moreh wrote in Arabic, Hebrew, and English.

== Publications in English (partial list) ==
- Nazik al-mala'ika and al-shi'r al-hurr in modern Arabic literature. Jerusalem: Israel Oriental Society. 1968
- Arabic works by Jewish writers, 1863–1973. Jerusalem: Ben Zvi Institute, 1973
- Bibliography of Arabic books and periodicals published in Israel 1948–1972. Jerusalem : Mount Scopus Center, 1974
- Jewish poets and writers of modern Iraq. Jerusalem: University of Jerusalem, 1974
- Modern Arabic poetry 1800-1970 : the development of its forms and themes under the influence of Western literature. Leiden : Brill, 1976
- Studies in modern Arabic prose and poetry. Leiden; New York : E.J. Brill, 1988
- Live theatre and dramatic literature in the medieval Arab world. New York : New York University Press, 1992
- Jewish contributions to nineteenth century Arabic theatre : plays from Algeria and Syria : a study and texts. Oxford : Oxford University Press, 1996
- Al Farhud : the 1941 pogrom in Iraq. Jerusalem: Magnes Press. 2010
- Marvelous Chronicles: Biographies and Events (ʿAjāʾib al-Āthār fī ʼl-Tarājim wa-ʼl-Akhbār). 5 volumes. Jerusalem: The Max Schloessinger Memorial Foundation, The Hebrew University of Jerusalem, 2014.

== Publications in Arabic (partial list) ==
- المطبوعات العربية التي ألفها أو نشرها الأدباء والعلماء اليهود 1863ـ1973 . القدس : معهد بن تسيفي لدراسة الجاليات اليهودية في الشرق . 1973
- فهرس المطبوعات العربية في إسرائيل 1948ـ1972 . القدس : مركز جبل سكوبس . 1974
- القصة القصيرة عند يهود العراق، ١٩٢٤–١٩٧٨. دار النشر ي.ل. ماغنس، ١٩٨١.
- مختارات من أشعار يهود العراق الحديث . القدس : معهد الدراسات الآسيوية والإفريقية . 1981
- بغداد حبيبتي: يهود العراق، ذكريات وشجون . حايفا: مكتبة كل شيء . 2012
- . عجائب الآثار في التراجم والأخبار. القدس. 2014

== Publications in Hebrew (partial list) ==
- עולמו המיוחד של יצחק בר-משה، 1959.
- לקט מתוך דרמות ערביות، 1961.
- סכסוך ערב-ישראל בראי הספרות הערבית، 1975 (بالاشتراك مع יהושפט הרכבי, יהושע פורת)
- חקרים בתולדות יהודי עיראק ובתרבותם، 1981.
- יצירתם הספרותית והמחקרית של יוצאי עראק בעראק ובישראל בדורנו، 1982 (بالاشتراك مع לב חקק)
- שנאת יהודים ופרעות בעיראק : קובץ מחקרים ותעודות، 1992.
- מילון אימרות ומשלים של להג יהודי בבל، 1995.
- האילן והענף : הספרות הערבית החדשה ויצירתם הספרותית הערבית של יוצאי עיראק، 1997.
