= Paul Starkey =

British scholar and translator of Arabic literature

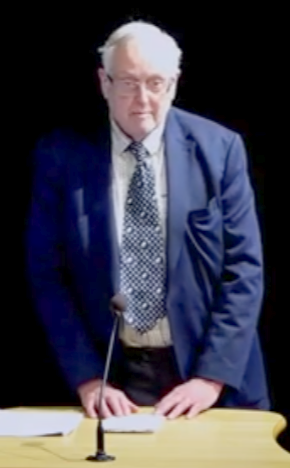
- Education: Oxford University
- Occupation(s): Academic, translator

Paul Starkey is a British scholar and translator of Arabic literature.

== Life and career ==
Starkey received his doctorate from Oxford University; the subject of his dissertation was the works of the Egyptian writer Tawfiq Hakim. He is emeritus professor of the Arabic department at the University of Durham and was also co-director of the Centre for Advanced Study of the Arab World (CASAW), a collaborative project by the Universities of Edinburgh, Durham and Manchester.

Starkey is the author of Modern Arabic Literature (2006), a survey of the field. He has also edited a number of books, contributed book chapters, and written essays, scholarly articles and monographs. He is a specialist on the Sixties Generation of Egyptian writers, in particular Sonallah Ibrahim and Edwar al-Kharrat.

Starkey has translated several contemporary Arabic novels, including works by Edwar al-Kharrat and Mansoura Ez-Eldin. His translations have been published in Banipal magazine and he has also served on the judging panel of the International Prize for Arabic Fiction.

== Select bibliography ==
=== As author ===
- Modern Arabic Literature (2006)

=== As editor ===
- Egypt Through the Eyes of Travellers, 2002 (co-edited with Nadia El Kholy)
- Interpreting the Orient: Travellers in Egypt and the Near East, vol 2, 2001 (with Janet Starkey)
- Unfolding the Orient: Travellers in Egypt and the Near East, 2001 (with Janet Starkey)
- Encyclopedia of Arabic Literature (two volumes), 1998 (with Julie Scott Meisami)
- Travellers in Egypt, 1998 (with Janet Starkey)

=== As translator ===
- Dear Mr Kawabata by Rachid al-Daif
- Maryam's Maze by Mansoura Ez-Eldin
- Shumaisi by Turki Al-Hamad
- Stones of Bobello by Edwar Al-Kharrat
- We Are All Equally Far from Love by Adania Shibli
- The Drowning by Hammour Ziada
- ? East Winds, West Winds by Mahdī ʻĪsá Ṣaqr. American University in Cairo Press 2010.

== See also ==
- List of Arabic-English translators
