= Ameen Rihani =

Lebanese American writer

Ameen Rihani أمين الريحاني
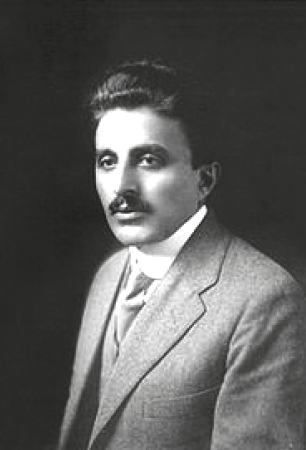
- Ameen Rihani in 1916
- Born: Amīn Fāris Anṭūn ar-Rīḥānī; November 24, 1876; Freike, Mount Lebanon Mutasarrifate
- Died: September 13, 1940 (aged 63); Freike, Greater Lebanon
- Spouse: Bertha Case
- Relatives: Ameen A. Rihani, May Rihani, Ramzi Rihani, Sarmad Rihani
- Writing career
- Period: 1876–1940
- Notable works: 29 works in English and 26 works in Arabic
- Movements: Mahjar, New York Pen League
- Website: www.ameenrihani.org

Ameen Rihani (Amīn Fāris Anṭūn ar-Rīḥānī; Arabic: أمين الريحاني / ALA-LC: Amīn ar-Rīḥānī; November 24, 1876 – September 13, 1940) was an Arab-American writer, intellectual and political activist. He was also a major figure in the mahjar literary movement developed by Arab emigrants in North America, and an early theorist of Arab nationalism. He became an American citizen in 1901.

== Early days ==
Ameen Rihani was born on November 24, 1876, in Freike, in the Mount Lebanon Mutasarrifate, Rihani was one of six children and the oldest son of a Lebanese Maronite raw silk manufacturer, Fares Rihani. In 1888, his father sent his brother and Ameen to New York City; he followed them a year later. Ameen, then eleven years old, was placed in a school where he learned the rudiments of the English language. His father and uncle, having established themselves as merchants in a small cellar in lower Manhattan, soon felt the need for an assistant who could read and write in English. Therefore, the boy was taken away from school to become the chief clerk, interpreter and bookkeeper of the business.

During this time, Ameen made the acquaintance of American and European writers. He eventually became familiar with the writings of Shakespeare, Hugo, Darwin, Huxley, Spencer, Whitman, Tolstoy, Voltaire, Thoreau, Emerson and Byron, to name a few. Ameen had a natural talent in eloquent speaking, and in 1895, the teenager got carried away by stage fever and joined a touring stock company headed by Henry Jewet (who later had his theatre in Boston). During the summer of the same year, the troupe became stranded in Kansas City, Missouri and so the prodigal son returned to his father. However, he returned not to rejoin the business, but to insist that his father give him a regular education for a professional career. They agreed that he should study law. To that end, he attended night school for a year, passed the Regents Exam, and in 1897 entered the New York Law School. A lung infection interrupted his studies, and at the end of his first year, his father had to send him back to Lebanon to recover.

Once back in his homeland, he began teaching English in a clerical school in return for being taught formal Classical Arabic. Rihani had first become familiar with Arab poets in 1897. Among these poets were Abul-Ala Al-Ma’arri, whom Ameen discovered to be the forerunner of Omar Khayyam. In 1899 he returned to New York, having decided to translate some of the quatrains of Al-Ma’arri into English. The first version of the translation was published in 1903. He began writing in English, becoming, according to Lebanese historian Samir Kassir, "the first Arab to publish in English without at the same time renouncing his own language." During this period, he joined several literary and artistic societies in New York, such as the Poetry Society of America and the Pleiades Club, and also became a regular contributor to an Arabic daily newspaper, Al-Huda, published in New York. He wrote about social traditions, religion, national politics and philosophy. Thus, he began his extensive literary career, bridging two worlds. He published his first two books in Arabic in 1902 and 1903.

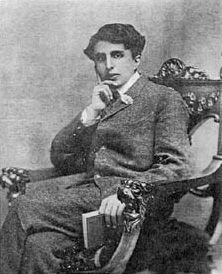
Ameen Rihani in 1904

In 1905 he returned to his native mountains. During an ensuing six-year period of solitude, he published, in Arabic, two volumes of essays, a book of allegories and a few short stories and plays. Rihani, who was influenced by the American poet Walt Whitman, introduced prose poetry to Arab literature. His new style of poetry was published as early as 1905. This new concept flourished in the Arab world and continued to lead modern Arab poetry after Rihani's death in 1940 and throughout the second half of the 20th century. Additionally, he lectured at the Syrian Protestant College (later The American University of Beirut) and in a few other institutions in Lebanon and the Arab World, as well as in the cities of Aleppo, Cairo, Damascus, Jerusalem, and others. He also worked, along with other national leaders, for the liberation of his country from Turkish rule. In 1910 he published Ar-Rihaniyyaat, the book that established him as a forward thinker and a visionary. As a result of Ar-Rihaniyyaat, the Egyptian media hailed him as "The Philosopher of Freike". During this same period of mountain solitude The Book of Khalid was written and was later published in 1911 after he returned to New York. The illustrations for this book, which was the first English novel ever written by a Lebanese/Arab, were provided by Khalil Gibran. A reception was held in honor of Rihani for the release of The Book of Khalid and the president of the New York Pleiades Club crowned him with a laurel garland.

== Established writer in Arabic and English ==
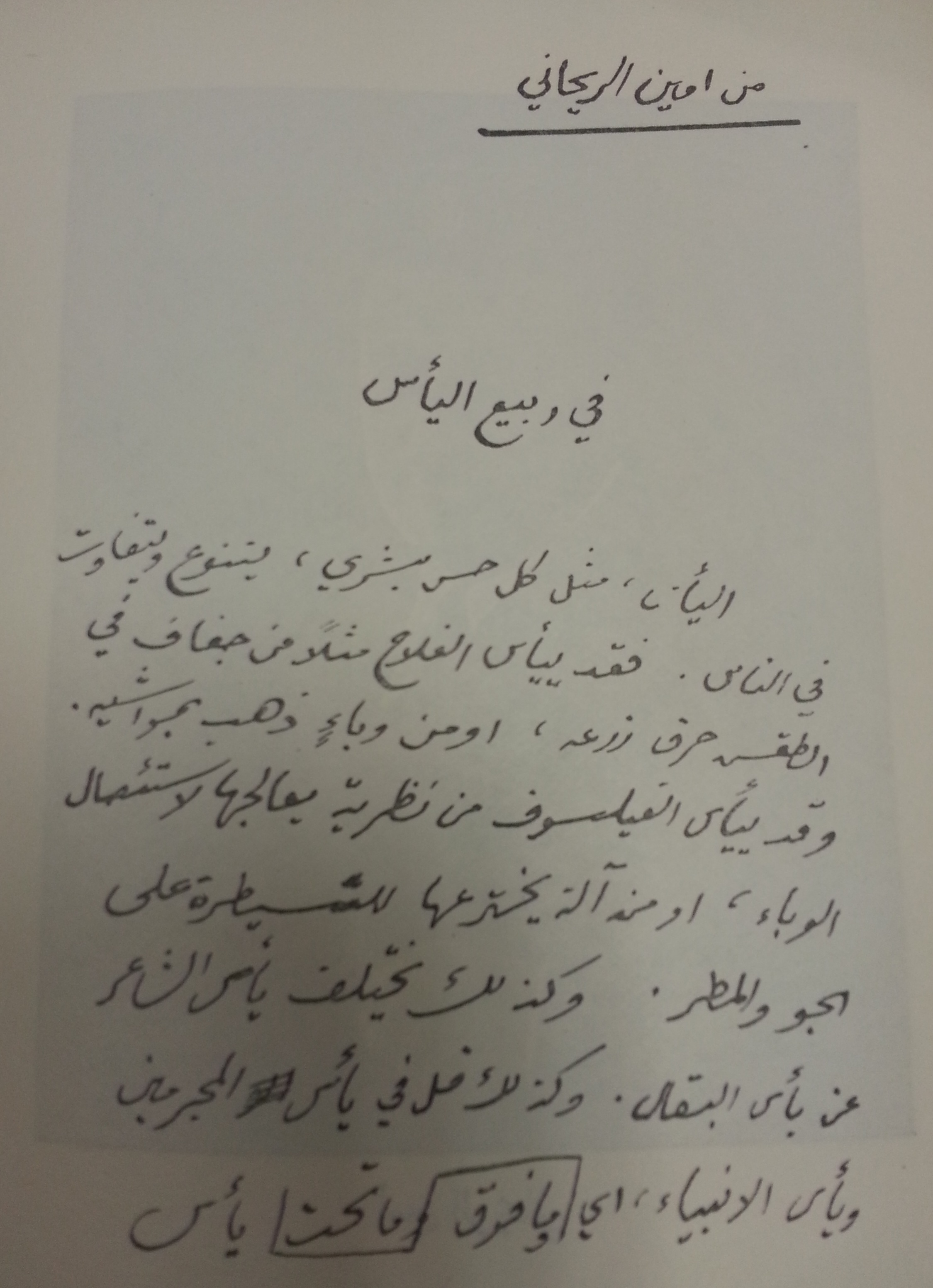
Amīn Al-Rīḥānī Hand Writing

During the period between 1910 and 1922 Rihani became remarkably involved in the literary life while continuing to pursue productive political engagements. On the literary level, he continued writing and publishing in English and Arabic. Among the books that he published during that period were: The Lily of A-Ghor, a novel in English, and (rewritten) in Arabic, describing the oppression of the woman (represented by Mariam) during the Ottoman Empire, Jihan, a novel in English about the role of Levantine women during World War I, The Luzumiyat, translation of the Arabic poetry of Al-Ma’arri into English with Rihani's introduction highlighting the significance of this poet to the Western mind, The Path of Vision, essays in English on East and West, A Chant of Mystics, poetry in English, The Descent of Bolchevism, political analysis in English on the Arab origins of the socialist movements, New Volumes of Ar-Rihaniyyaat, philosophic and social essays in Arabic.

In 1916 Ameen married Bertha Case, an American artist, who was part of the Matisse, Picasso, Cézanne and Derain group in Paris, and the Midi, and joined them in exhibiting her work at the Salon de Mai. Bertha visited Lebanon in 1953 (thirteen years after Ameen's death), staying with the family of Rihani's brother, Albert, in Freike. On July 29, 1970, Bertha died in New York at the age of 91. She had requested that her body be cremated and that her ashes be sent to Freike to be buried next to her husband's. Bertha's niece, Sally Storch also became a professional artist.

Ameen and his wife Bertha visited Pope Benedict XV in 1917. The Pope was heartedly interested in ending World War I and in establishing an equitable peace between the fighting armies. During that same year, Ameen met with Theodore Roosevelt, former President of the United States concerning the Palestinian case. In 1919 Rihani was asked to represent Arab interests at the Hague Peace Conference. In 1921 he served as the only Near Eastern member of the Reduction of Armaments Conference in Washington, D.C. During those years he joined another number of literary circles in New York, among which are the Authors’ Club, and the New York Pen League.

On the political front, he advocated several causes and worked tirelessly towards these goals: the rapprochement between East and West as a major step towards global cultural dialogue, the liberation of Lebanon from the rule of the Ottoman Empire, and the advocating for Arab nationalism and promoting what he called “The United States of Arabia”.

== Political and intellectual activist ==
In 1922 Rihani traveled throughout Arabia, meeting and getting better acquainted with its rulers. He was the only traveler at that time, European or Arab, to have covered that whole territory in one trip. He acquired an invaluable and first-hand account of the character, vision and belief of each of these rulers. He developed a friendship with Ibn Saud, ruler of the desert kingdom that would soon become the Kingdom of Saudi Arabia. Between 1924 and 1932 he wrote and published six books in English and Arabic related to the three trips he made to Arabia. These accounts were a considerable critical and public success. London publishers released a circular on Rihani's travel books as having been best sellers. He is considered by some scholars as a major figure in the intellectual development of Arab nationalism. In his writings on national issues, he emphasized the importance of a secular state and a secular education pointing that there must be no minorities or majorities, but only equal citizens. Rihani placed the greatest priority on the spread of nationalist and pro-unity feeling among the masses, and argued that rulers would have to follow. During that time, he also published another four books in Arabic, and delivered numerous speeches in Lebanon, the Arab world, the East and West Coasts of the United States, and in Canada ranging in topics from social reform to politics, Pan-Arabism, East and West cohesion, poetry and philosophy. Rihani also participated in the Arab American movement championing the Arab Palestinian cause. Much of this activity focused on countering the rising influence of the American Zionist lobby, which supported a separate Jewish state in Palestine. He met with various U.S. officials in this regard and, during the 1920s and 1930s, was active on behalf of the Arab American, Palestine Anti-Zionism Society (later renamed the Arab National League). Rihani publicly debated leading figures in the American Zionist movement and published numerous articles critical of political Zionism. During the last eight years of his life, Ameen Rihani wrote the remainder of his books, continued to be active in his political, literary and philosophical endeavors, and maintained close contacts with several political leaders, poets, writers, scholars and artists. Samir Kassir points to Rihani's role in bringing Beirut into intellectual contact with its "cultural environment as well as the wider world".

Ameen Rihani died at age 64 on September 13, 1940, at 1:00 pm, in his hometown of Freike, Lebanon. The cause of his death was a bicycle accident which resulted in infectious injuries from multiple fractures of the skull. The news of his death was broadcast to many parts of the world. It caused great emotion not only in Lebanon but throughout the Arab world. Representatives of Arab kings and rulers and of foreign diplomatic missions, together with leading poets, writers, and other intellectuals from Lebanon and the Arab World, attended the funeral ceremony. He was laid to rest in the Rihani Family Mausoleum in Freike. Thirteen years after his death, in 1953, his brother Albert established the Ameen Rihani Museum in Freike to honor his legacy.

== Overview ==
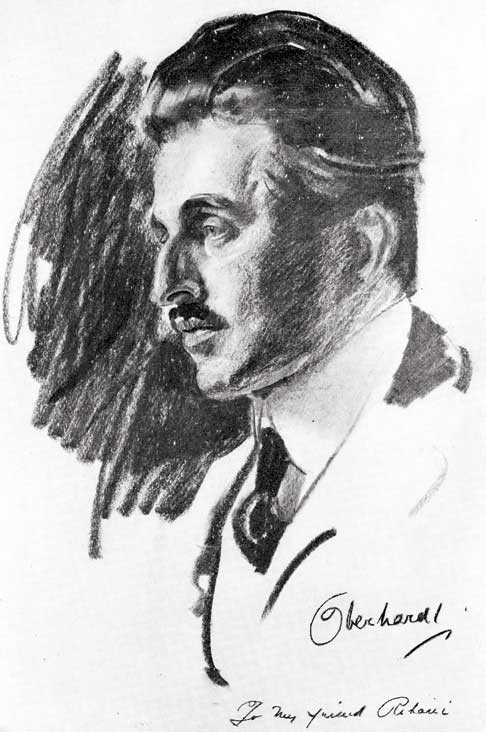
Ameen Rihani in 1921 (Portrait by William Oberhardt)

Rihani is the founding father of Arab American literature. His early English writings mark the beginning of a school of literature that is Arab in its concern, culture and characteristic, English in language, and American in spirit and platform. He is the first Arab to write English essays, poetry, novels, short stories, art critiques, and travel chronicles. He published his works in the U.S. during the first four decades of the twentieth century. In this sense, he is the forerunner of American literature written by well known Middle Eastern writers.

Rihani is also considered to be the founder of "Adab Al-Mahjar" (Immigrant Literature). He is the first Arab who wrote complete literary works, either in Arabic or in English, and published in the U. S. (New York). His writings pioneered the movement of modern Arabic literature that played a leading role in the Arab Renaissance and contemporary Arab thought.

Rihani's Arabic book of essays entitled Ar-Rihaniyyaat (1910), endorsed his major philosophic and social beliefs and values that were reflected in his future works. These beliefs were addressed in the essays of this work such as: Who Am I, Religious Tolerance, From Brooklyn Bridge, The Great City, The Spirit of Our Time, The Spirit of Language, In the Spring of Despair, The Valley of Freike, On Solitude, Ethics, The Value of Life, Conducts of Life, Optimism, The Scattered Truth, Trilateral Wisdom, The Most Exalted Prophet, The State of the Future ... This book consecrate Rihani as a controversial writer paving the way for modernity in Arabic literature and contemporary Arab thought.

Rihani's first major novel (in English), The Book of Khalid (1911), was considered a pioneering literary work that paved the way for Arab-American literature. It combined reality and fiction, East and West, spiritualism and materialism, the Arabs and the Americans, philosophy and literature, in a style of language where Arabic metaphors and English language structures go together in an attempt to create an abstract line where both languages can almost touch. Khalid, the hero of the novel, descends from Baalbek, from the roots of the Cedars in Lebanon and immigrates all the way to New York where he faces all the contradictions of his Oriental soft background and the harshness of the Occidental severe reality. He dreams of the virtual Great City, thinks of the ideal Empire, and looks for the Superman who combines within himself the spirituality of the East, the art of Europe, and the Science of America.

According to several scholars, The Book of Khalid is the foundation of a new literary trend towards wisdom and prophecy that seeks to reconcile matter and soul, reason and faith, together with the Orient and the Occident in an attempt to explicate the unity of religions and represent the unity of the universe.

His books on Arabia, written originally in Arabic and in English, represent an alternative perspective to the Orientalist movement by giving the world, for the first time, an objective and analytical description of Arabia from an Arab point of view. These are Maker of Modern Arabia (1928), Around the Coasts of Arabia (1930), and Arabian Peak and Desert (1931). This Arab Trilogy was considered by the publishers in the United States and Europe as best sellers at the time. The author wrote accounts of his travels to Arabia, in Arabic first, and were published under the titles of Muluk-ul Arab (Kings of the Arabs), Tareekh Najd Al-Hadeeth (History of Modern Najd), Qalb-ul Iraq (The Heart of Iraq) and other works on Arabia that were considered to be a remarkably critical and public success.

Scholars, at the dawn of the twenty-first century, recognize the role of Rihani in the discourse of civilizations: Nathan C. Funk argues that “Rihani’s approach to intercultural reconciliation emerged gradually, reflecting the maturation of his personal identity. Though he was quick to develop an intellectually critical attitude toward all forms of intolerance rooted in traditional cultures, Rihani did not stop with the celebration of free thinking and the espousal of forms of national unity that renounce religious confessionalism”. Terri DeYoung compares Rihani with Walt Whitman and highlights the fact that: “Walt Whitman attempted to expose the contradictions within a philosophy ... that called for individual liberty and freedom while at the same time permitting slavery ... So too do Rihani’s writings on the questions of whether democratic principles are evenly projected onto both societies – American and Middle Eastern – where he lived and worked, continue to challenge our most cherished assumptions about ourselves”. Geoffrey P. Nash, on the other hand, emphasizes the spirit of modernity in the works of Rihani where his writings: “prompt a diachronic shift to the early twentieth century, the epoch in which Rihani, who has also been designated a prophet, was composing his first essays on cross-cultural literary and political subjects".
