= Kahlil Gibran (disambiguation) =

Kahlil Gibran (1883–1931) was a Lebanese-American writer, poet and visual artist.

Kahlil Gibran or Khalil Gibran may refer to:

- Kahlil Gibran (Kray), a 1991 bronze sculpture of the poet by Gordon Kray
- Kahlil Gibran (sculptor) (1922–2008), a Lebanese-American painter and sculptor
- Khalil Gibran International Academy, a public school in Brooklyn, New York, U.S.
- Khalil Gibran School Rabat, an international school in Rabat, Morocco

== See also ==
- Khalil Gibran Muhammad (born 1972), an American academic
- Gibran Khalil Gibran Garden, Beirut, Lebanon
