= Gebran (name) =

Gebran (Arabic: جبران) is a given name and family name in Arabic. It is also transliterated as Gibran, Jebran, Jibran, Joubran, Jubran, Goubran and Gubran. It might also appear with an additional "e" at the end, like in Gebrane, Gibrane etc.

People with the name include:

== Gebran ==
- Gebran Araiji (1951–2019), Lebanese politician and former president of the Syrian Social Nationalist Party (SSNP)
- Gebran Bassil (born 1970), Lebanese politician and government minister
- Gebran Tueni (1957–2005), full name Gebran Ghassan Tueni, Lebanese politician, minister and the former editor and publisher of Lebanese daily paper An Nahar. Victim of assassination.
- Gebran Andraos Tueni (1890–1948), Lebanese journalist, founder of Lebanese daily paper An Nahar

== Ghibran ==
- Ghibran Vaibodha (born 1980), Indian composer known for his work in Tamil and Telugu films

== Gibran ==
- Kahlil Gibran (1883–1931), full name Gibran Khalil Gibran, Lebanese artist, poet, and writer
- Kahlil Gibran (sculptor) (1922–2008), full name Kahlil George Gibran, Lebanese American painter and sculptor
- Khalil Gibran Muhammad (born 1972), American academic
- Gibran Hamdan, American NFL football player
- Gibrán Lajud Bojalil (born 1993), Mexican footballer
- Gibran Marten (born 1987), Indonesian actor and singer
- Gibran Mohammed (born 1983), Trinidadian cricketer
- Gibran Rakabuming Raka (born 1987), former vice president of Indonesia
- Gibran Rayo (born 2001), American soccer player

== Goubran ==
- Yara Goubran, Egyptian film, television and stage actress

== Jebran ==
- Nicolas Jebran (born 1974), Lebanese fashion designer
- Mifdzal Jebran (born 2024), Jamal Afdzal's first born

== Jibran ==
- Syed Jibran, Pakistani actor known for his lead role in Hum TV series Meray Khwab Raiza Raiza

== Joubran ==
- Salim Joubran (1947–2024), Israeli Arab judge on the Supreme Court of Israel
- Wissam Joubran (born 1983), Palestinian composer, oudh virtuoso, and master lute maker. Part of Le Trio Joubran
- Le Trio Joubran, an oud trio of the brothers Samir, Wissam, and Adnan Joubran, playing traditional Palestinian music

== Jubran ==
- Hanna Jubran, Palestinian sculptor
- Jabir Jubran Al Fayfi (born 1975), Saudi Arabian national who was held in extrajudicial detention in Guantánamo Bay detention camp, in Cuba on allegations he trained and fought with Al-Qaeda and the Taliban in Afghanistan in 2001
- Sultan Jubran Sultan al-Qahtani (1974–2003) known also as Zubayr Al-Rimi, a militant in al-Qaeda's Saudi wing accused of complicity in the Riyadh compound bombings in 2003.

== See also ==
=== Institutions named after or in tribute to Gibran Khalil Gibran ===
- Gibran Khalil Gibran Garden, a public garden in the Centre Ville area of Beirut, Lebanon
- Gibran Museum, formerly the Monastery of Mar Sarkis, biographical museum in Bsharri, Lebanon, dedicated to the Lebanese artist, writer and philosopher Khalil Gibran
- Khalil Gibran International Academy, a public school in Boerum Hill, Brooklyn, New York City
- Khalil Gibran School Rabat, Morocco

=== Other uses ===
- Gibran (crater), a crater on Mercury
- Gowrun, Kerman, a village in Iran, also known as Gebrān, Gabrān and Jowrān
