= Ramy Ayach =

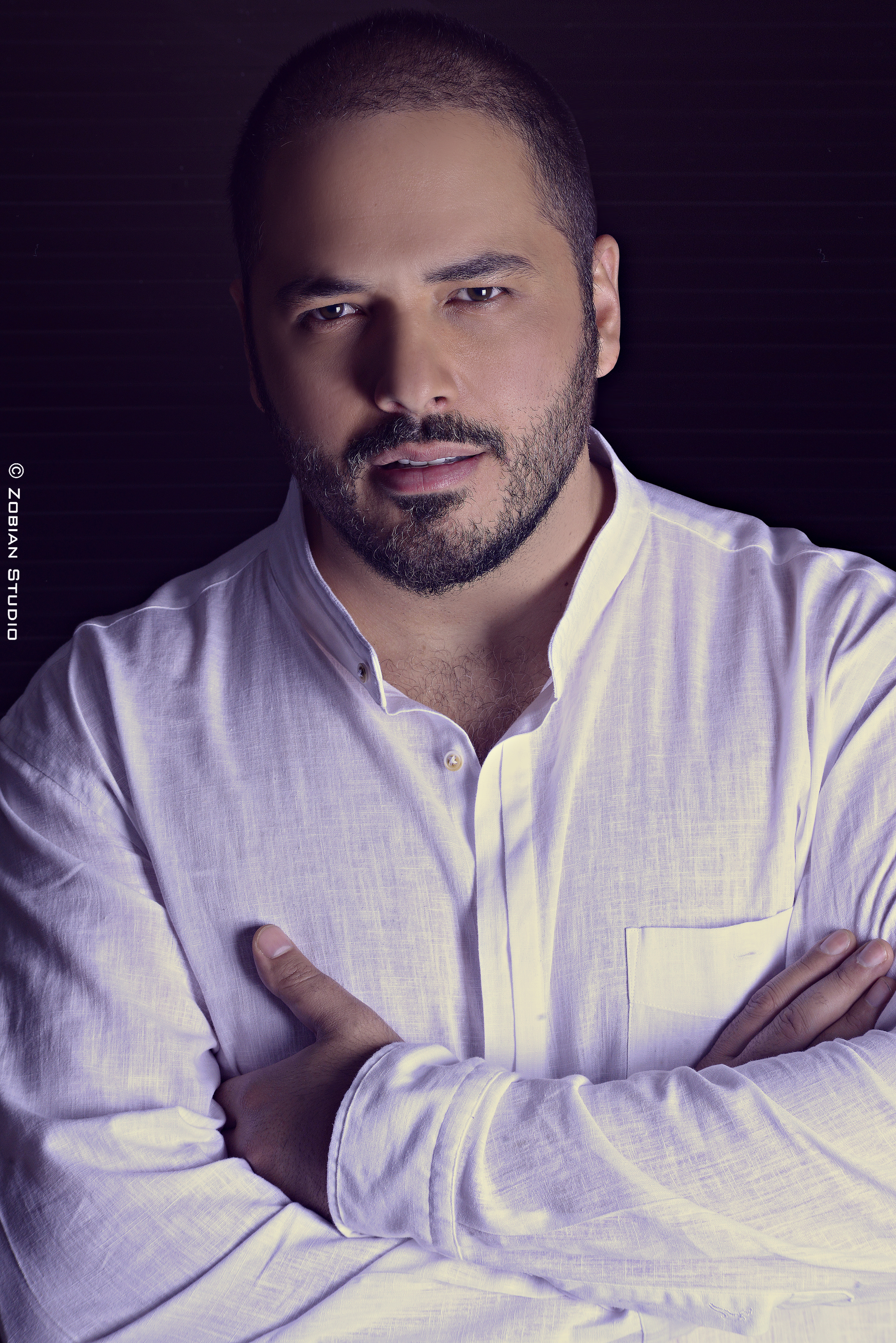

Background information
- Born: Ramy Abu Ayach رامي ابوعياش; August 18, 1980 (age 45); Baakline, Lebanon
- Genres: Arabic pop
- Occupations: Singer, songwriter, composer
- Instruments: String instruments, oud, Piano, percussion
- Years active: 1997–present
- Label: Ayach Management

Ramy Abu Ayach (Arabic: رامي ابوعياش, born August 18, 1980) is a Lebanese singer, composer, and actor. Commonly referred to as the "Pop Star" in the Arab world for his impact and contribution to the contemporary Arab music scene and Pop Culture, Ayach is a winner of the most prestigious Pan-Arab awards, and is behind some of the most recognizable Arab hits of the modern era such as "Mabrouk", "Albi Mal", "Khalini Ma3ak", "El Nas El Ray2a", and "Majnoun". Also an actor, his most recent role was in the hit drama series "Amir El Leil".

== Career ==
=== Music ===
Ramy Ayach rose to fame in 1997, when he won the 1st prize of the Pan-Arab talent show competition Studio Al Fan. Shortly afterwards, Ramy Ayach released his first studio album in 1998, Ra2e3, for which he gained critical and commercial success with pop culture hit singles such as "Bghanila w bde2ela" and "la3younak bade ghane".

In addition to being a singer, Ramy Ayach writes lyrics and plays several instruments, including the piano, the oud, and the bass.

Following the great success of his music throughout the Arab region and the Arab diaspora worldwide, Ramy Ayach went on to gain the title of "Pop Star", given to him by his large fan-base.

Ramy Ayach has been recognized and awarded prizes multiple times throughout his career, for both his work in music and as a devoted philanthropist.

=== Debut: 1997–2001 ===
In 1998, Ramy Ayach released his debut album, Ra2e3, named after the hit single of the same name, which was first released in 1997. In 1999, Ayach released his second album, Mo3jiza, followed by a third album the following year, Diwan Al Hob, and a 4th album, W al2ah, in 2001.

=== Pop star status and international success: 2002–present ===
In 2002, Ramy Ayach released his 5th album, Albi Mal, taken from the album lead single of the same name.

In 2004, Ayach released his 6th album, Ya Msahar 3eni, considered to be one of the artist's biggest successes with pop hits such as "Ya Msahar 3eni" and the hit "Mabrouk", which is played in almost every celebration in the Arab world.

In 2007, another smash-hit album was released by the artist, titled "Habaytak Ana", which showcased Ayach's vocal capabilities. The album included numerous hits, and led him to perform at the prestigious Opera Houses of Cairo and Alexandria in Egypt. Ayach was the first Arab artist to perform at both Opera Houses, selling out both venues. His successful performances at the Egyptian Opera House won him the title of "Amir Al Tarab" (the prince of Tarab) by the Egyptian media.

2009 was another turning point for Ramy Ayach, which saw his first duet experience with Egyptian pop star, Ahmad Adawiya. The pair released the smash-hit single "El Nas el Ray2a", which topped the Arabic charts for a whole year.

In 2010, Ayach released his 8th album, Gharami, a much-anticipated album which was a shift in the artist's musical genre. The album comprised the hit singles "Effrah Fiki" and "Majnoun/Tal El Sahar", distinguished by its avant-garde stylings. Furthermore, the music videos from said albums won the artist best music videos at the Murex d'or Awards. The album, as a whole, won the artist "Best Art Work" at the 2012 Murex d'Or awards.

In 2012, Ramy Ayach released another hit single titled "Jebran", which gained wide critical and commercial success. "Jebran" was composed by Ayach.

In 2015, Ayach released the hit single "Yala Nor2os", a festive song imprinted by fast beats, a style now associated with the artist. In 2016, Ayach released "7keye Jeye" as the official soundtrack of the hit drama series Amir El Leil, in which he starred in the leading role. "7keye Jeye" topped the Arabic charts for several months.

Ramy Ayach's released in 2017 an album titled "Ya 7abib Al 9alb".

=== Actor ===
In 2015, Ramy Ayach's first experience as an actor in a leading role, was in the pan-Arab thriller movie Paparazzi.

In 2016, Ayach took on another acting role in the hit Pan-Arab drama series Amir El Leil, a historic series based on the life-story of Lebanese Omar Chehab, which takes place during the French protectorate era in Lebanon. Ayach's leading role, as Prince Omar Chehab, won him critical praise, as well as "Best Male Actor & Singer" award at the Murex d'Or 2017 awards, in addition to the Murex d'Or for Best Song of the Year. The series pilot aired on the Lebanese-based pan-Arab network LBC in September 2016, followed by 76 episodes, with the finale airing in February 2017. The Amir El Leil series was a commercial, popular, and critical success, and ranked at the top of drama series in terms of viewers.

== Awards and recognition ==
- 2017 | Murex d'Or for Best Actor & Singer
- 2017 | Murex d'Or for Song of the Year
- 2016 | Murex d'Or for Excellence in Singing and Interpretation
- 2016 | LAU Appreciation Award
- 2015 | Murex d'Or for Best Lebanese Male Artist
- 2013 | Delta Award
- 2013 | OTV Award
- 2013 | Red Cross Friendship Association in Chouf Appreciation and Distinction Award
- 2012 | Bissaraha Award for Best Music Video Jebran
- 2011 | Murex d'Or of the Year for Outstanding Achievement
- 2011 | Murex d'Or for Best Music Video "Majnoun"
- 2011 | 13th Festival of the Arabic Music Distinction Award on behalf of the Independent Syndicate of Moroccan Musicians
- 2011 | Baakline Municipality Recognition and Appreciation Award
- 2011 | AUCE Youth Ambassador
- 2011 | AUCE Distinction Award
- 2011 | Lebanese Diaspora in Canada Association Award for Singer of the Year
- 2009 | MENA Award for Best Music Video " Al Nas Al Ray2a"
- 2008 | 1st International Song Festival Award
- 2006 | Murex d'Or Song of The Year "Habaytak Ana"
- Lions Club | Appreciation Award
- Rotary International | Appreciation Award

== Discography ==
Year	Title	Label
1998	Ra2e3	Music Box International
1999	Mo3jiza	Music Box International
2000	Diwan El 7ob	Rotana
2001	W Al2ah	Rotana
2002	Albi Mal	Rotana
2004	Ya Msahar 3eni	Rotana
2006	7abaytak Ana	Rotana
2010	Gharami	Melody Music
2019	9issat 7ob	Mazzika

== See also ==
- List of Druze
