= Mohammed VI Foundation of African Oulema =

- Founded: July 13, 2015; 11 years ago
- Founder: King Mohammed VI
- Type: Islamic organization
- Headquarters: Fez, Morocco
- Website: fm6oa.org

The Mohammed VI Foundation of African Oulema (FM6OA) is a Muslim religious institution established in 2015. It contributes to strengthening the supervision of religious activities in several African countries, notably through training programs. Through its activities, the foundation helps prevent radicalization and combat jihadist ideologies.

== History ==
The Mohammed VI Foundation of African Oulema was created on July 13, 2015, at the initiative of King Mohammed VI. It is part of Morocco's policy to reorganize the religious field, launched following the Casablanca attacks of 2003.

Within this framework, King Mohammed VI promotes a “moderate Islam,” aimed at countering extremist deviations and encouraging ulema to uphold the true values of Islam.

== Missions ==
The Mohammed VI Foundation of African Oulema aims to strengthen ties between African oulema and coordinate their actions in the religious field.

It organizes scientific and cultural meetings and develops cooperation programs with Islamic institutions. Its activities focus in particular on training, spreading values of tolerance, and promoting a moderate Islam based on coexistence and peace.

== Organization ==
The foundation includes several governing bodies:

- The Supreme Council
- The Executive Bureau
- The Delegated Presidency
- The General Secretariat
- The Financial Directorate

== National sections ==
The Mohammed VI Foundation of African Oulema has 48 sections across the African continent. These sections implement the foundation's activities in their respective countries.

=== West Africa ===
- Republic of Benin Section
- Republic of Burkina Faso Section
- Republic of Ivory Coast Section
- Republic of The Gambia Section
- Republic of Ghana Section
- Republic of Guinea-Bissau Section
- Republic of Guinea (Conakry) Section
- Republic of Liberia Section
- Republic of Mali Section
- Federal Republic of Nigeria Section
- Republic of Senegal Section
- Republic of Sierra Leone Section
- Republic of Togo Section

=== Central Africa ===
- Republic of Cameroon Section
- Central African Republic Section
- Republic of the Congo Section
- Gabonese Republic Section
- Republic of Equatorial Guinea Section
- Republic of Chad Section

=== East Africa ===
- Republic of Djibouti Section
- Federal Democratic Republic of Ethiopia Section
- Republic of Kenya Section
- Federal Republic of Somalia Section
- Republic of Sudan Section
- Republic of South Sudan Section
- United Republic of Tanzania Section
- Republic of Uganda Section
- Republic of Rwanda Section

=== Southern Africa ===
- Republic of South Africa Section
- Republic of Angola Section
- Republic of Botswana Section
- Kingdom of Eswatini Section
- Kingdom of Lesotho Section
- Republic of Malawi Section
- Republic of Mozambique Section
- Republic of Namibia Section
- Republic of Zambia Section
- Republic of Zimbabwe Section

=== Indian Ocean ===
- Union of the Comoros Section
- Republic of Madagascar Section
- Republic of Mauritius Section
- Republic of Seychelles Section
