= EIHS =

EIHS may refer to:

- Ellis Island Honors Society
- Energy Institute High School
