= KGIA =

KGIA may refer to:

- Khalil Gibran International Academy, a public school in Brooklyn, New York, United States that emphasizes the study of Arabic language and culture
- KGIA-LP, a defunct low-power radio station (92.9 FM) formerly licensed to serve Grand Island, Nebraska, United States
