= Moderate Muslim =

Political and religious term

Moderate Muslim and Moderate Islam are terms that are used within religious and political discourse to interpret the faith that promotes democracy, human rights, and religious tolerance, while strictly denouncing violent extremism to describe the obverse of Islamic extremism and imply that supporting Islamic terrorism is the characteristic of extremist groups within Islam. The moderate Muslims denounce extremist violence such as Islamic terrorism, Jihadism and radical Islamism. The general criticism of this term is that it implies that the "Islam" and "Muslim" refer to something inherently violent, giving the impression that they need an adjective ("moderate") to assure otherwise.

== Policy View ==
In Western geopolitical and counterterrorism contexts, "moderate Islam" often describes Muslims and societies that actively reject militancy, support secular democratic values, and maintain friendly relations with the West. Organizations like the RAND Corporation have historically explored building these networks to foster democratic ideals.

French researcher of religious extremism Olivier Roy also points out the difficulties of focusing on "moderate" Islam or Islamic reformation as a means of fighting terrorism. In an interview in with Qantara he stated:

Radicals are not "mainstream" Muslims who went astray after studying the Koran and Islamic theology. You donʹt become a terrorist because you listen to a Salafist preacher ... (radicalisation occurs less in mosques than in jail). They donʹt choose radicalism (either religious or political) because of their theological studies: they want radicalism. Even if other people succeed in reforming Islam, it wonʹt change the mind of the radicals. Secularists tend to consider a moderate believer someone who believes moderately, but that is not the definition of moderation for believers; moderation for them is not about beliefs, but about accepting life in a secular society, even if they stick to conservative values. That is exactly what Muslims are learning to do.

The Ennahdha Party of Tunisia has been described as a moderate Islamist party since the 1980s, when it advocated a "Tunisian" strain of Islamism recognizing democracy, political pluralism and a "dialogue" with the West. In 2011, a spokesman for the party described it as moderate Islamic rather than Islamist, since it does not want a theocracy.

== Islamic Theological View ==
From an Islamic standpoint, concepts like wasatiyyah (the middle path) and iqtisad (moderation and frugality) are deeply rooted Quranic principles that advocate for a balanced, ethical lifestyle between extremes. Moderation in Islam and moderate Islam are also terms that occur as interpretations of the Islamic concept of moderation as well as Iqtisad (Arabic: اقتصاد, lit. 'Frugality') and Wasat (Arabic: وسط, lit. 'Centre'). The Islamic concept of moderation are mentioned in the Quran, and is used to describe the Muslim community:

And thus we have made you a moderate community that you will be witnesses over the people.

— Al-Baqara, 2: 143

== Academic & Critical Views ==
Moderate views, in the first sense, are widespread according to opinion polls. A majority in eleven Sunni Muslim countries is very negative towards the Islamic State. Moderate perceptions are especially common among Muslims in the Western world, such as Islam in Europe. Among American Muslims, 82 percent (2017) are concerned about Muslim global extremism, 81 percent believe that suicide bombing can never be justified, and 48 percent believe Muslim leaders have not done enough to prevent extremism (2011).

Moderate Islam should not be confused with moderate Islamism. Before the 2008 Egypt election, the fundamentalist Muslim Brotherhood was described as moderate Islamists in comparison to the radical Islamists in the country's Salafist party.

Several Muslim scholars and leaders have made objections to the term "moderate Islam", and argued harm is caused by its usage.

The writer Shireen Younus explains, "The qualifier of “moderate” suggests that there is something innately violent about Islam. It leads to the false conclusion that a small group of “moderates” is standing in opposition to a giant swathe of violent, ISIS-supporting radicals and this is simply not true because the reality is the complete opposite. When the media talks about “moderate Muslims”, they are perpetuating a dangerous narrative of Islam as a violent religion that is at odds with American society."

The Doctor of Law Lorenzo G. Vidino describes the term as "inherently controversial, vague and subjective" and Muslim scholars such as Dr Debbie Almontaser have argued that Muslim populations predictably find the "moderate Muslim" label offensive.

Adrian Cherney and Kristina Murphy argue that the categorisations of moderate/extremist are not neutral, and that their widespread deployment "deprives Muslims of the agency to define the parameters of the debate around counterterrorism and also the terms of reference through which they are labelled as either for or against terrorism." Although some Muslims do employ the use of such language, it is seen by others as further stigmatising Muslim communities and Islam.

The Pakistani born journalist Sarfraz Manzoor also argues that the "moderate Muslim" label is offensive, as he believes that it implies ordinary Islam is not inherently peaceful. Others believe that it implies that "moderate Muslims" are not "fully Muslim", or that the term equivalates "progressive" or "secular" with "moderate". Others, such as Turkish President Recep Tayyip Erdoğan (in response to the Saudi Crown Prince's ‘moderate Islam’ pledge) reject the term as a Western notion stating that there is only one Islam.

== See also ==
- Cultural Muslims
- Moderate
- Wasatiyya (Islamic term)
- Islam and modernity
- Islamic modernism
- Liberalism and progressivism within Islam
- Moderate, a middle position in a left/right political scale
- Islamic neo-traditionalism – Strand of Sunni Islam, also known as Wasatism
