= Arabic Immersion Magnet School =

School in Houston, Texas

Coordinates: 29.8116°N 95.4129°W

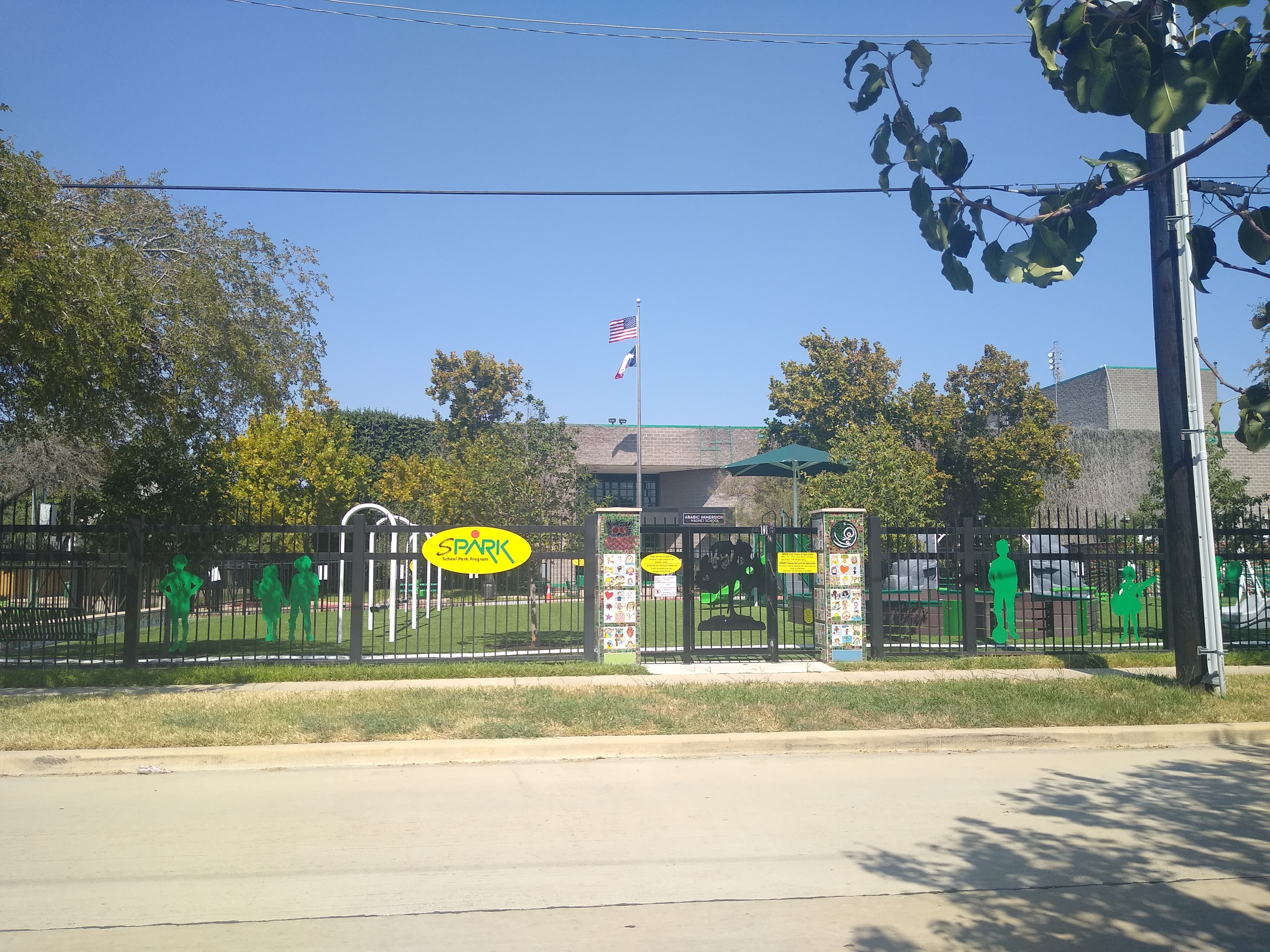
Arabic Immersion Magnet School

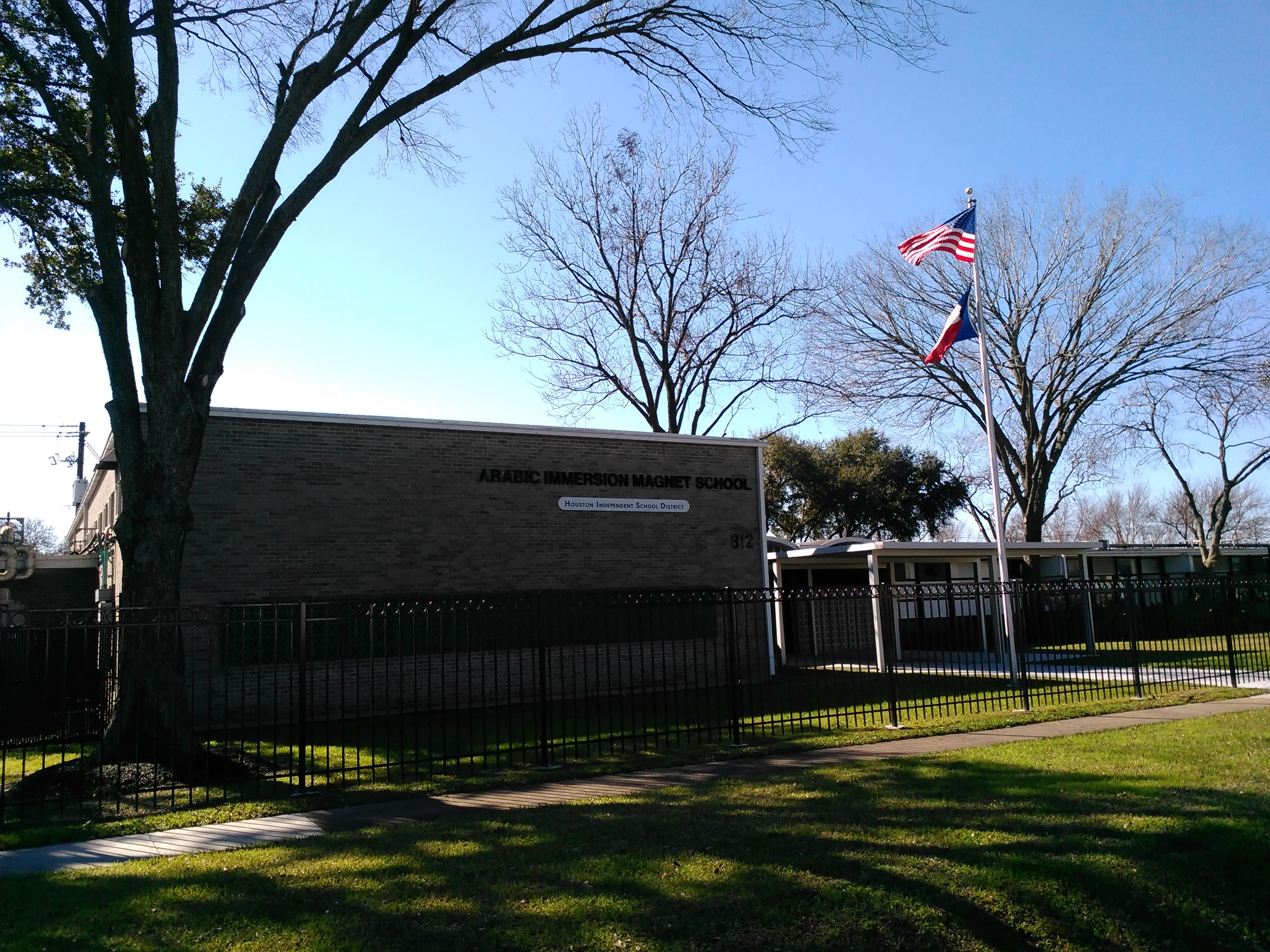
Arabic Immersion Magnet School former campus in the Houston Heights

Arabic Immersion Magnet School (AIMS) is a magnet school in the Montrose area of Houston, Texas. A part of the Houston Independent School District (HISD), it currently covers elementary school grades. It uses a grant from the Qatar Foundation, and it is one of the first Arabic language immersion schools in the United States. It is a part of HISD's efforts to increase the number of bilingual students. Prior to 2019 the school was in the Houston Heights. Mahassen Ballouli became principal in Summer 2017 after the founding principal, Kate Adams, left.

== History ==
On Thursday, November 14, 2014, the HISD Board of Education approved the establishment of the school. The board approval was unanimous, and at the time there were no protesters. In May 2015 around 12 people complained about the future school to the HISD board.

Its initial campus, in Block 21 of the Houston Heights, previously housed Holden Elementary School and the Energy Institute High School. The district planned to upgrade the heating and cooling systems, restrooms, lighting, and technology of the former Holden building.

A total of 490 applications for 132 slots for students were submitted. The school opened on Monday August 24, 2015 with 130 students, all in preschool and kindergarten. The school has plans to create one new grade level each year. The school ultimately plans to have the eighth grade as the highest level.

On the opening day a group of about 30 protesters gathered around the school, accusing it of being anti-American and hindering assimilation.

In May 2019 HISD announced that, effective fall 2019, AIMS will be located at the former High School for Performing and Visual Arts (HSPVA) in Montrose. It is on Blocks 12 and 13 of the Lockard Connor and Barziza Addition.

== Curriculum ==
In 2015 each student spent half of their day learning in English and the other half learning in Arabic. The school focused on Modern Standard Arabic after an HISD cross-functional team deemed that it should do so.

However, the school has now changed tack and has applied for IB (International Baccalaureate) status, causing a rewrite of the school's curriculum. The IB authorization process takes two to three years, and it is expected that a new curriculum will have been developed by that time.

== See also ==
- Khalil Gibran International Academy – An Arabic magnet school in New York City
