= The Alloy Block =

Development in Brooklyn, New York

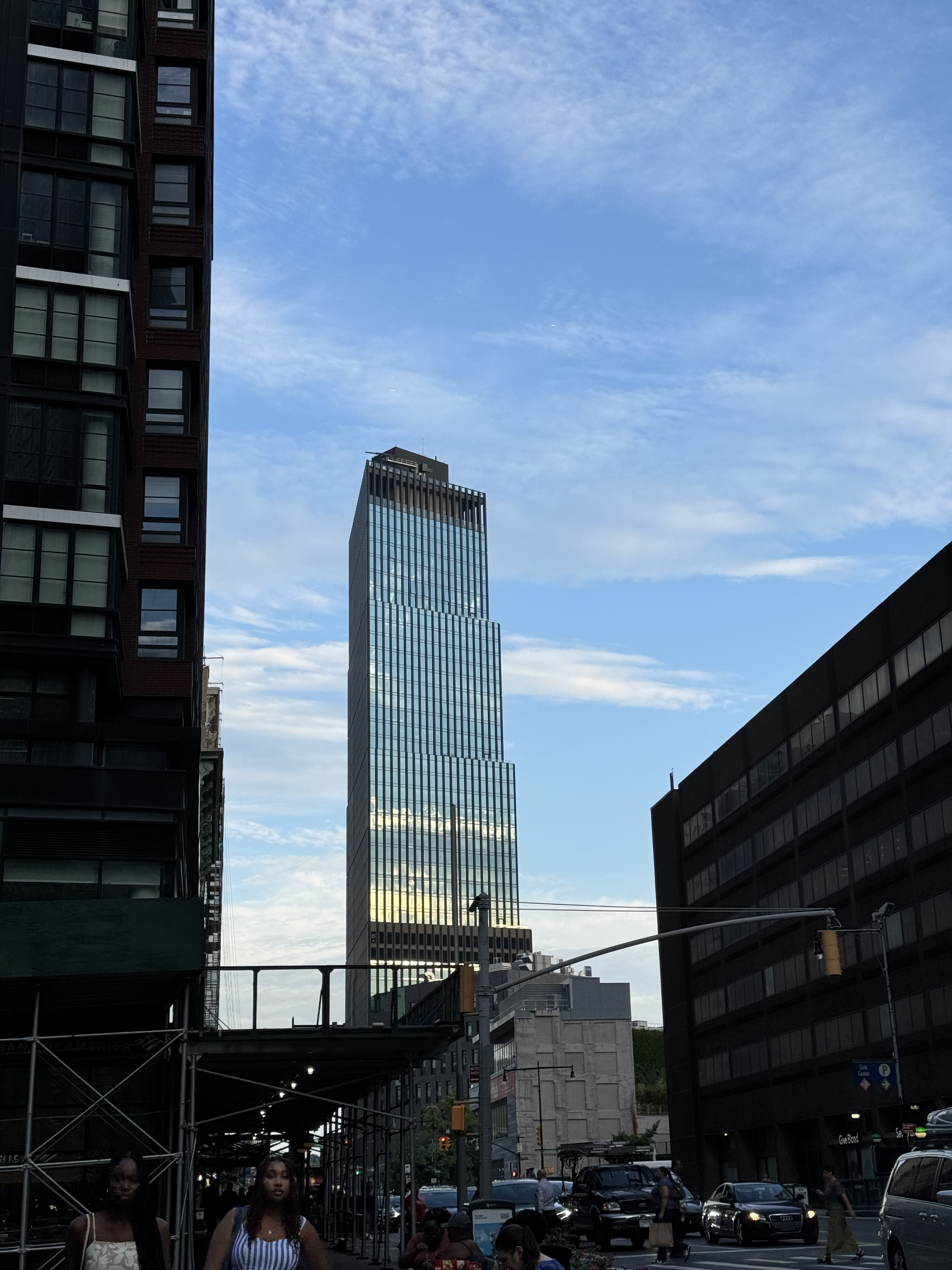
- Interactive map of the The Alloy Block area
- Alternative names: 80 Flatbush, 100 Flatbush

General information
- Status: Under construction
- Type: Mixed-use
- Coordinates: 40°41′10″N 73°58′46″W
- Construction started: 2021
- Estimated completion: 2028

Height
- Roof: 482 ft (147 m) (100 Flatbush)

The Alloy Block is an under-construction mixed-use development in Boerum Hill, Brooklyn, New York City, near Downtown Brooklyn. The first building at 505 State Street is 482 feet (147 m) high and contains 441 residential units and a retail base. A second building at 80 Flatbush Avenue will contain two schools, and the complex will include three additional buildings, including preexisting structures. The structures are being developed by Alloy Development.

The buildings were proposed in the late 2010s as a two-tower complex with residences and offices. Construction was delayed in the early 2020s, due to the COVID-19 pandemic in New York City, and the office space was removed from the plans. 505 State Street was topped out during 2023.

== Planning ==
The development occupies a triangular plot in Brooklyn. One of the buildings on the site, a former Civil War infirmary, will be preserved and re-purposed as a cultural facility. Originally, the development was to consist of two towers. The first tower to be built would have been 38 stories high and contained two elementary schools. The second tower would have been 920 feet (280 m) high with offices and apartments, including 200 affordable units, across 74 stories. The completion of the project was contingent on the rezoning of the site owned by Alloy and the New York City Department of Education so that two towers can be built and floor-area ratio can be tripled. Without the rezoning, Alloy would still be able to build a single tower taller than the Williamsburgh Savings Bank Tower across Flatbush Avenue, which is over 500 feet (150 m) tall.

Local community members feared that 80 Flatbush as originally planned would cast large shadows around Boerum Hill and Prospect Heights, since one of the towers was originally supposed to be as tall as the Chrysler Building, which is 1,046 feet (319 m) tall. Housing advocates meanwhile urged approval of the project as necessary to alleviate the city's housing shortage. In August 2018, New York City Council member Stephen Levin announced that he would seek a height reduction. Following a height reduction for both towers, the project was approved by a New York City Council subcommittee in September 2018, and was subsequently approved by the full council. The height of Phase One was cut from 986 to 840 feet (301 to 256 m) while Phase Two was cut from 560 to 510 feet (170 to 160 m).

== Construction and changes ==
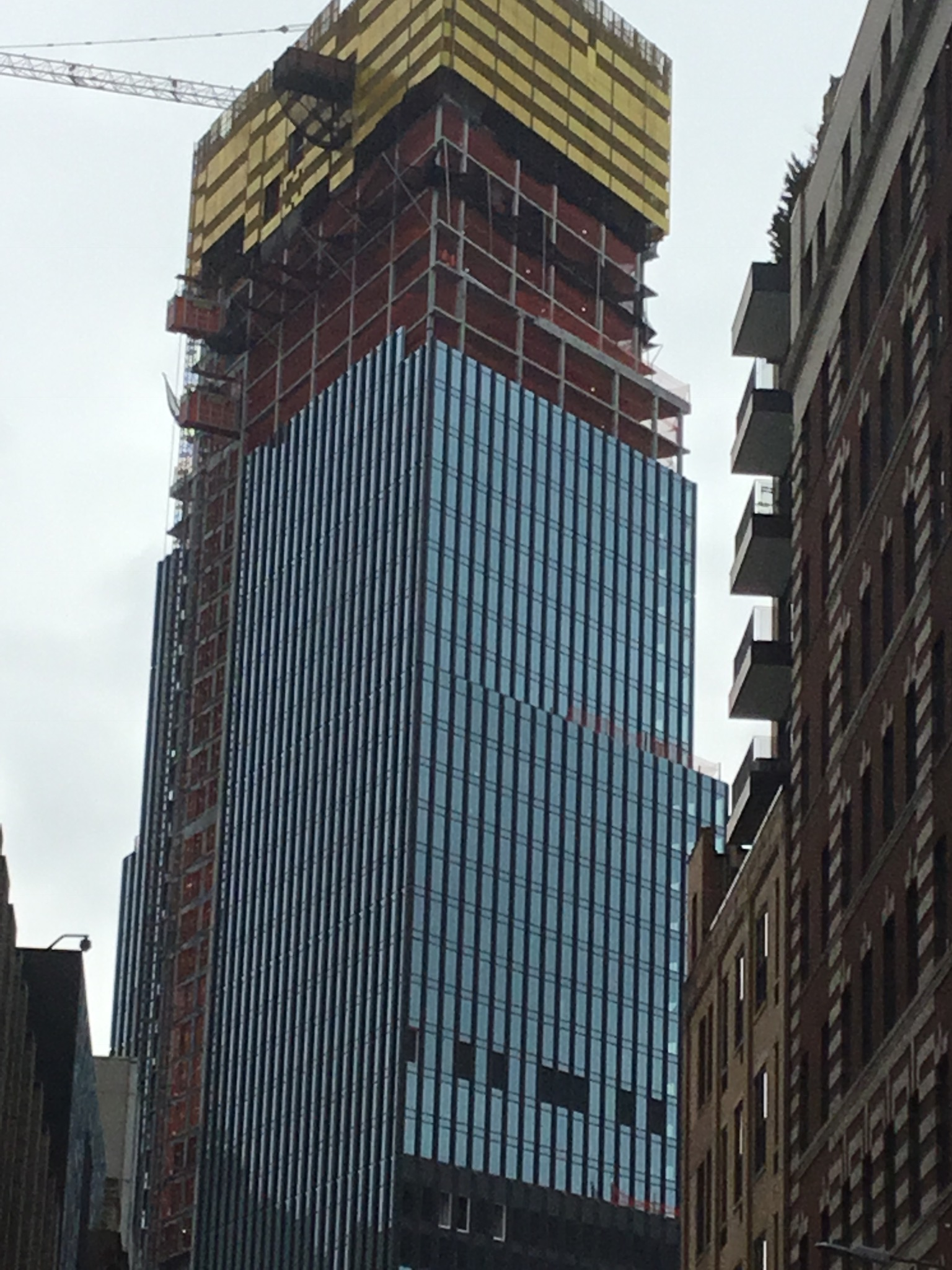
100 Flatbush Avenue, Jan 2023

As of October 2019, demolition of the site's preexisting structures had begun. The first tower, designated as 100 Flatbush Avenue, was supposed to have been built by 2022, and the second tower would have been completed by 2025. Alloy announced in December 2019 that the first tower would be the first fully-electric mixed-use skyscraper in New York City; the first tower was pushed back to 2023 and the second tower was delayed to 2026. The project was delayed significantly due to the COVID-19 pandemic in New York City. In May 2021, Alloy announced that, due to a steep decline in office space during the pandemic, the office space at 100 Flatbush Avenue would be scrapped. The number of apartments at 100 Flatbush would increase from 257 to 441, and the residential address of that tower was changed to 505 State Street.

By the middle of 2021, the project had received a construction loan of $240 million, allowing work on the project to commence. The development was renamed the Alloy Block. Work on 505 State Street's foundation started in December 2021, and the superstructure of 505 State Street was constructed starting in June 2022. 505 State Street topped out during January 2023, and the developers launched an affordable housing lottery for first tower's affordable-housing apartments that October. Over 107,000 people applied for the affordable apartments. Leasing for the market-rate apartments commenced in January 2024, and 505 State Street was finished by that April.

The Khalil Gibran International Academy relocated to 505 State Street in November 2024. Alloy Development refinanced 505 State Street that December with a $290 million mortgage from New York Life Real Estate Investors; by then, that building was 85 percent leased. In February 2025, Alloy announced plans for another structure in the complex, known as One Third Avenue. That August, Alloy Development received a $495 million construction loan for One Third Avenue.

== Description ==
=== 505 State Street ===
The first structure was originally known as 100 Flatbush Avenue and has since been renamed 505 State Street. It has 45 affordable apartments and 396 market rate apartments, as well as retail space. The tower is 482 feet (147 m) with 44 stories. The lowest three stories of the facade are made of dark concrete to blend in with nearby buildings. The upper stories are clad in glass and aluminum. The facade contains setbacks on its State Street elevation, maximizing views of Manhattan, while the elevation facing Flatbush Avenue is flat. The architectural website Dezeen compared 505 State Street to Manhattan's Flatiron Building, which also occupies a triangular site.

505 State Street is New York City's first residential building to be completely electric. Instead of appliances operated with natural gas, it contains electric water pumps, electric dryers operated by heat pumps, and induction cookers. The all-electric appliances were added in response to a local law requiring most new buildings in the city to use electric appliances from 2026. Accordingly, mechanical features such as high-capacity electric wires and HVAC systems had to be included in the building. The building's amenities include an interior garden for plants, a 3,000-square-foot (280 m^{2}) gym room, a yoga room, children's room, screening room, lounge, and roof terrace with swimming pool. The children's room includes a mural by Maru Godas, and one of the other rooms, known as the Grow Room, has seating and greenery. There is also a coworking space with a kitchen, phone rooms, and conference rooms. In addition, there is a private coffeehouse, a laundry room, a pet wash, and a bike room.

The smallest units are studio apartments, while the largest apartments contain three bedrooms each. The market rate and affordable apartments contain the same interior decorations because Alloy Development founder Jared Della Valle wanted the design to be "democratizing" as opposed to "polarizing". INC Architecture and Design and Rebecca Robertson designed the apartments. Robertson's firm, RR Interiors, decorated several model apartments using secondhand furniture from sources such as Craigslist. The windows in each apartment are 7.5 feet (2.3 m) tall and have three panes for insulation. Each of the apartments has exposed-concrete surfaces, oak floors, and ceilings measuring 9 to 12 feet (2.7 to 3.7 m) high. The appliances in the apartments were intended to be controlled directly from residents' smart devices.

=== Other structures ===
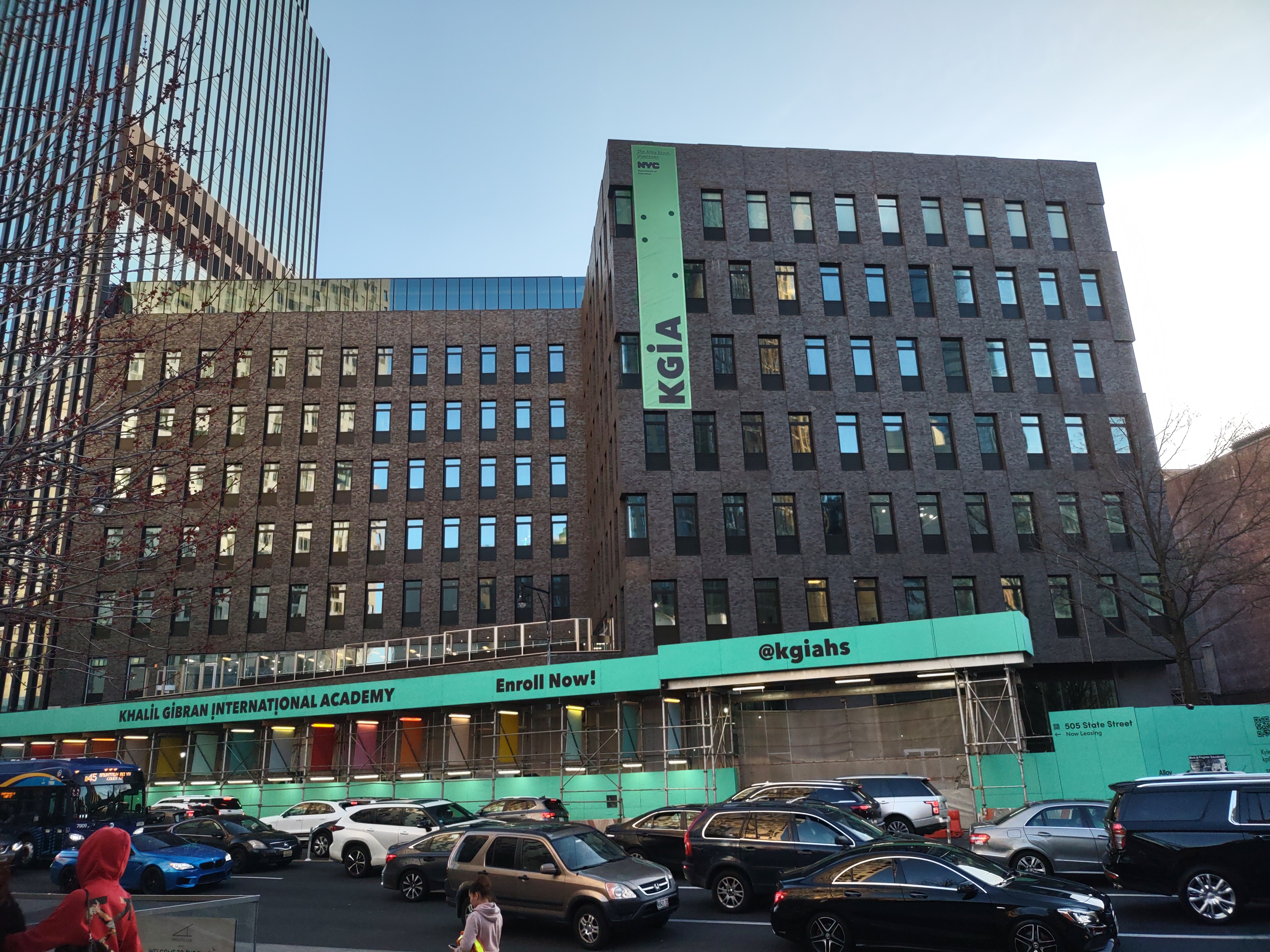
80 Flatbush Avenue, March 2024

There will be four additional buildings, including both new developments and preexisting structures redeveloped by Alloy. A second new structure at 80 Flatbush Avenue contains two schools. One of the schools is an expanded facility for Khalil Gibran International Academy. The other is a new 350-seat elementary school, known as The Elizabeth Jennings School for Bold Explorers (PS 465). Both schools have their own stairs, terraces, libraries, and classrooms, while they share an auditorium, gym, and kitchen area. Nelson Byrd Woltz Landscape Architects designed a raised outdoor terrace for the two schools on Flatbush Avenue and a ground-level outdoor terrace on State Street. In addition, the lobbies contain artwork by Wendy Letven and Alfruz Amighi.

Plans call for a 63-story passive house tower at One Third Avenue, measuring 725 feet (221 m) tall; this would make it the world's tallest passive house tower when completed along with NYC's first passive house school at 80 Flatbush Ave. One Third Avenue is planned to have six office stories, followed by 583 apartments (including 152 affordable units) on its 11th through 60th floors. Alloy Development is also restoring two existing brick buildings on the site. Alloy partnered with the nonprofit BRIC to turn one of the existing buildings into new spaces for the organization.
