= East Downtown Houston =

District in Houston, Texas

Coordinates: 29.750°N 95.350°W

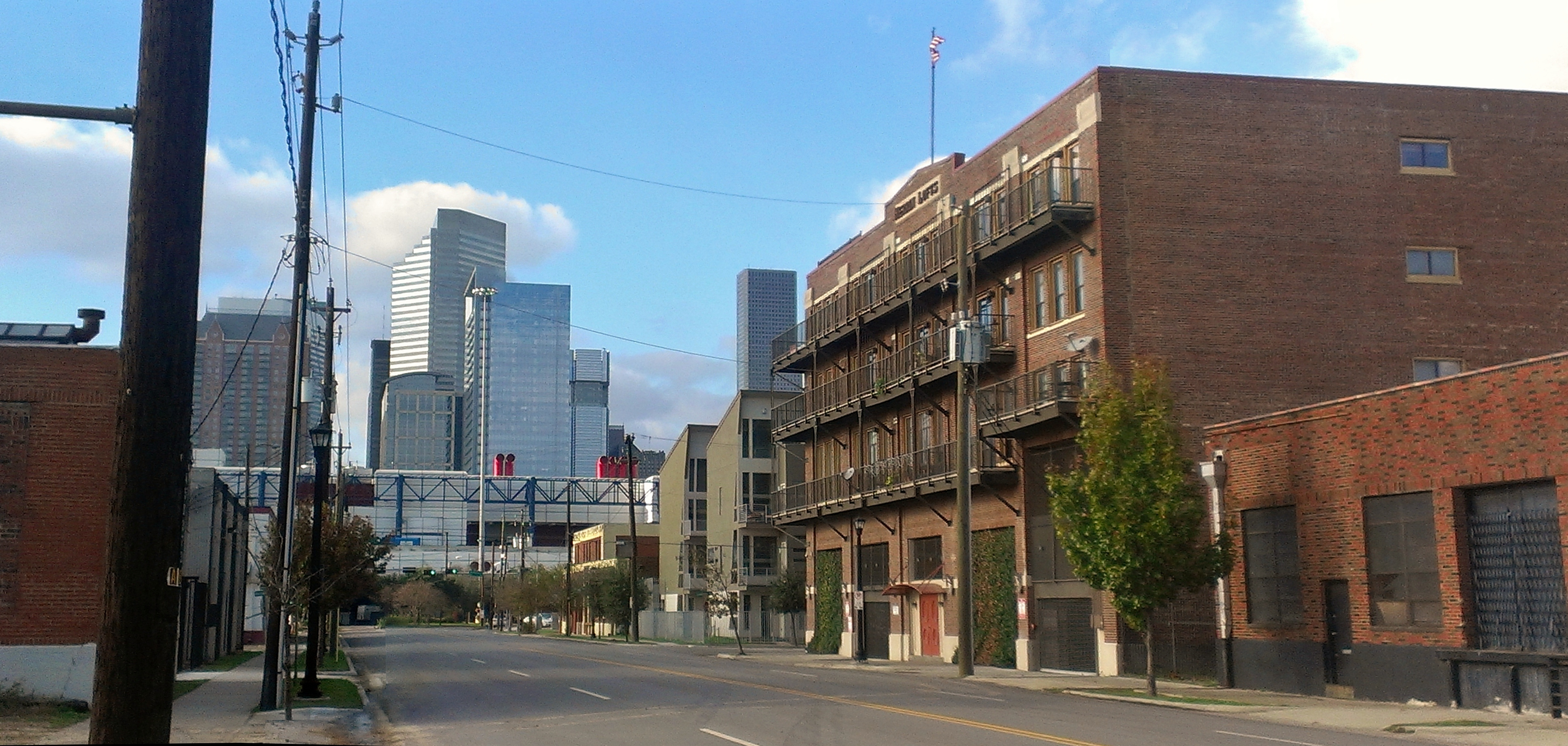
Residential buildings in East Downtown Houston

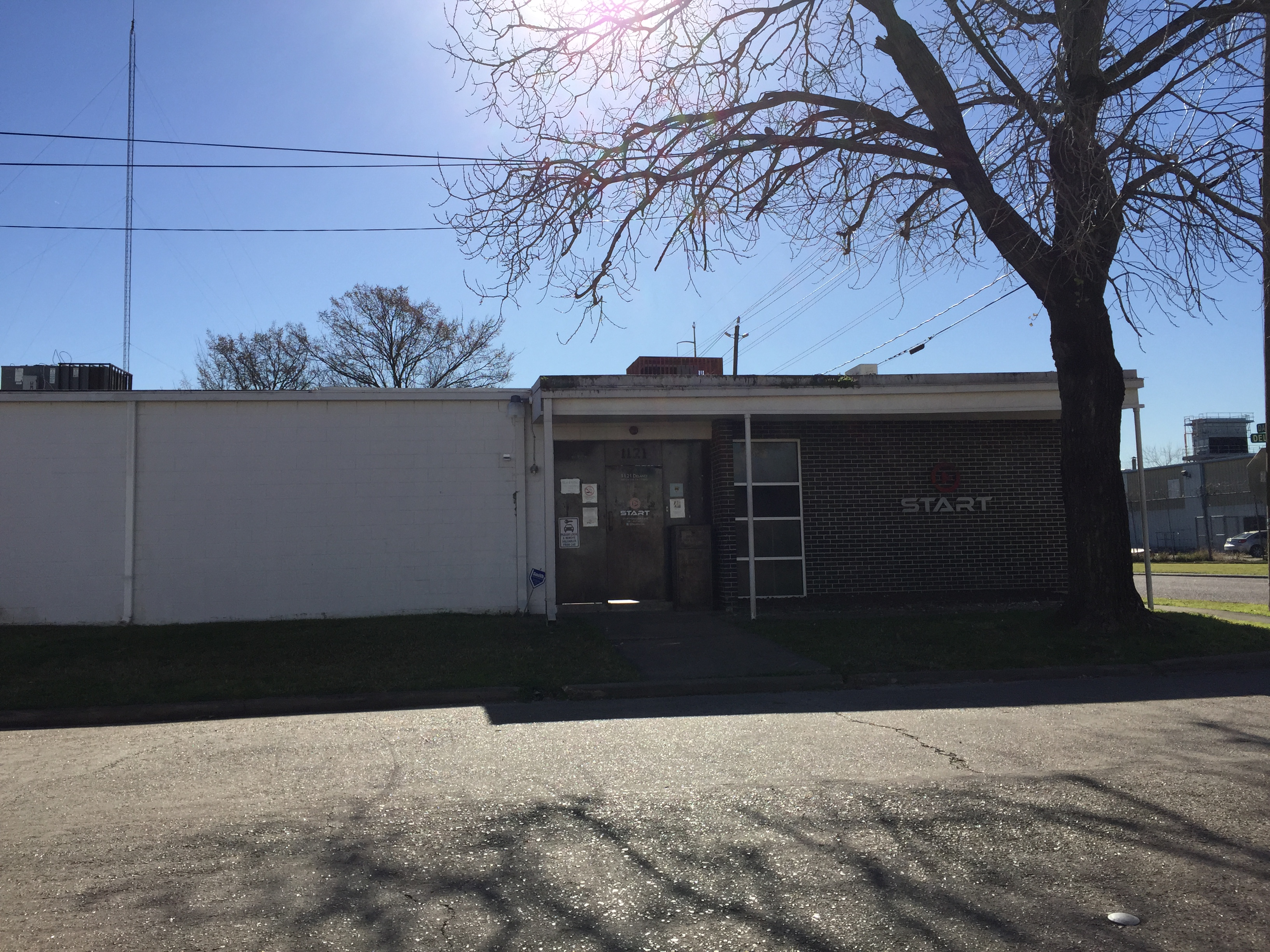
START Houston houses the offices of the management district

East Downtown Houston (EaDo) is a district in Houston, Texas. The East Downtown Management District (EDMD) manages the area with offices headquartered at START Houston, a co-working space at 1121 Delano Street. The community is located east of Downtown Houston and north of Interstate 45 (Gulf Freeway). It is between the George R. Brown Convention Center and the East End district.

Old Chinatown is an area within East Downtown bounded by Interstate 69/U.S. Route 59, Preston Street, St. Joseph Parkway, and Emancipation Avenue. In the late twentieth century most of its Asian residents relocated to Chinatown in southwestern Houston.

== History ==
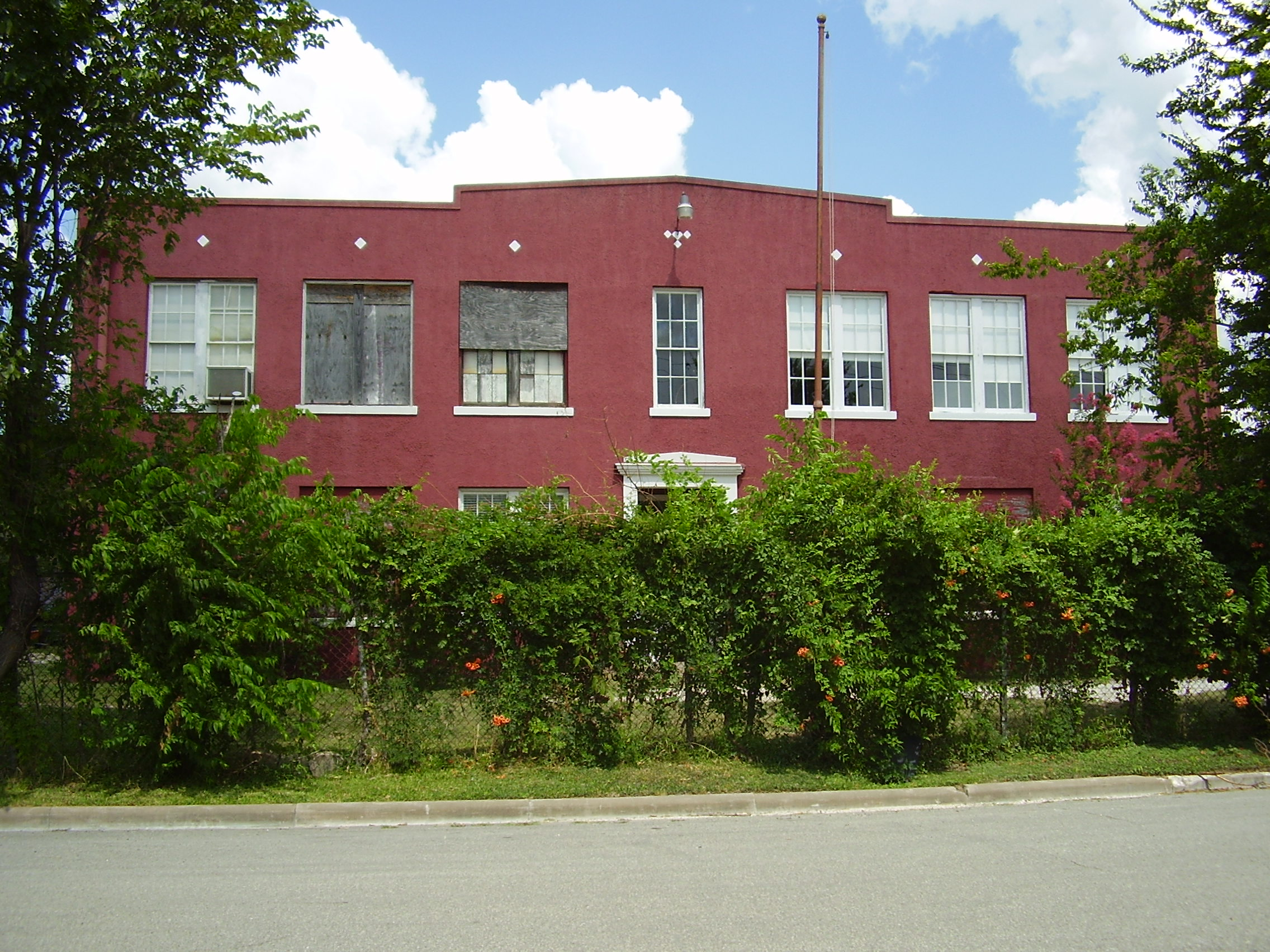
The former Luckie School

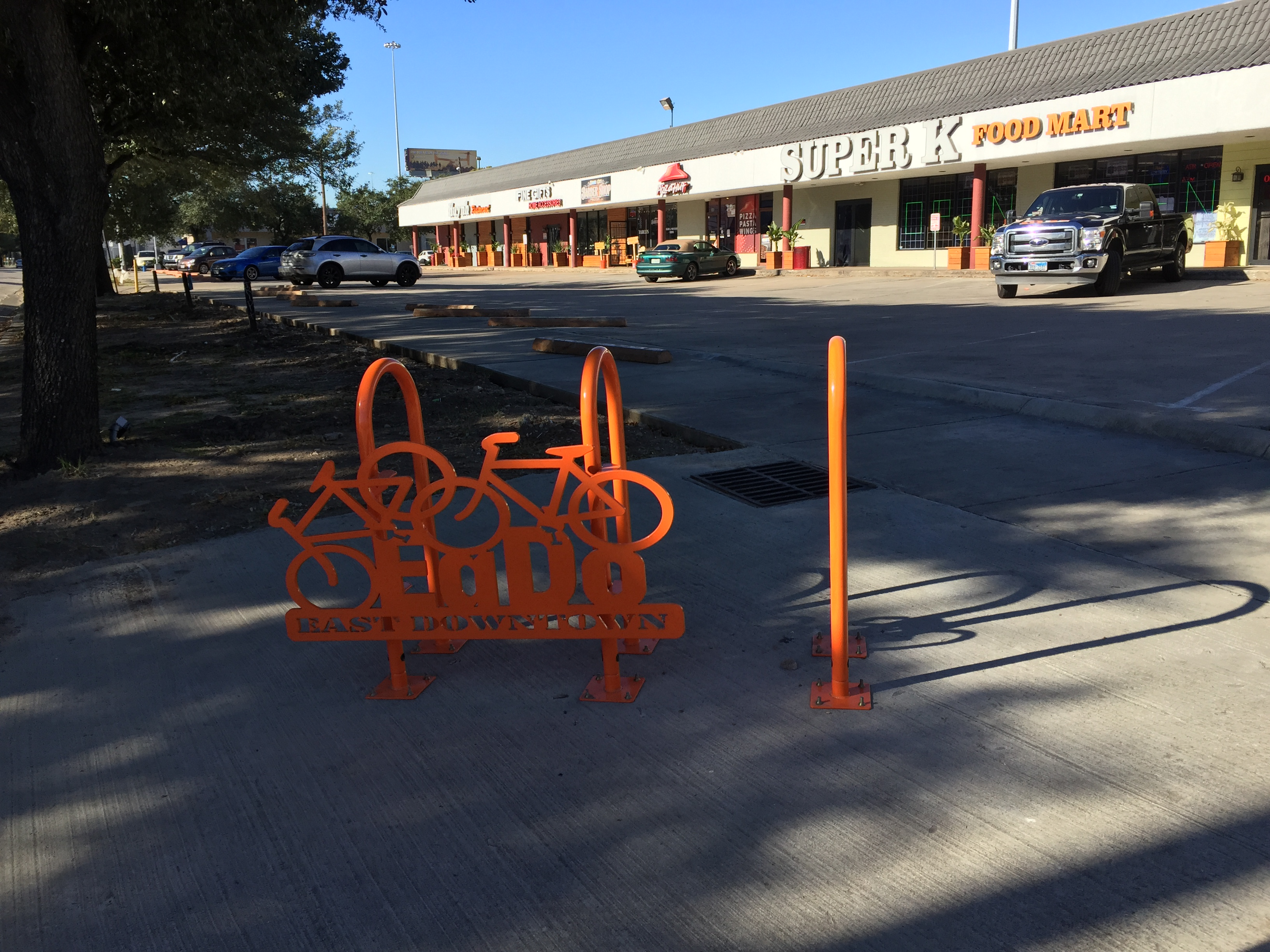
EaDo sign

After Houston's founding in 1836, the area was part of Third Ward.

In the 1930s, Cantonese immigrants moved to the district from Downtown Houston in an effort to find more inexpensive land. The Cantonese opened several businesses, including grocery stores and restaurants, and held Chinese New Year celebrations. Immigrants from other East Asian countries, including Vietnam, moved into what became known as Houston's second Chinatown.

In the early 1950s, the Chinese Merchants' Association moved to the southeastern edge of Downtown Houston. Many Chinese businesses moved there, as a previous Chinatown in Downtown was replaced with commercial development by the 1970s. The district was separated from Downtown and Third Ward by the construction of the Gulf and Eastex Freeways in the 1940s and 1950s. Chinatown solidified as many Asian immigrants, including Viet Hoa, began moving to Houston in the 1970s. By the 1980s a theater, supermarkets, warehouses, a bank, and restaurants were located there.

Lang Yee "Bo Bo" Woo, from Guangdong province, facilitated development in Chinatown during the 1970s. Traffic increased to Chinatown after Houston Center in Downtown opened. Area newspapers wrote articles about Chinatown. When the George R. Brown Convention Center was proposed, the Houston Center Improvement Committee stated that it could stimulate Chinatown. After Woo died, Dan Nip became the main driving force behind Chinatown.

By the late 1980s, increasing numbers of Chinese began living in suburbs in Southwest Houston and Fort Bend County. In addition, Chinatown was geographically hemmed in, with surrounding low income African-American and Hispanic neighborhoods, railroads, and Downtown preventing additional growth. Two Chinese religious temples opened about 1 mile (1.6 km) south of Old Chinatown in the 1990s. There were plans from private entities and the city government to promote and assist the development of Old Chinatown, but a local recession harmed those efforts. Anthony Knapp and Igor Vojnovic, authors of "Ethnicity in an Immigrant Gateway City: The Asian Condition in Houston," wrote that "Into the early and mid-1990s, Old Chinatown had considerable promise and this was evident in just its role in promoting tourism."

The stimulus promised by the new convention center materialized. The sewer system was not extensive enough to handle the proposed development. One major street connecting the old Chinatown with Downtown was closed when the Brown Convention Center was expanded. By the 1990s, many of the East Asian businesses left and had relocated to the current Chinatown in southwest Houston.

In a November 28, 2002 Houston Press article John Nova Lomax described what is now known as East Downtown Houston as "a silent, godforsaken stretch of no-man's-land that's not really the Warehouse District, nor the Third Ward, nor the East End." Lomax said that he used "that bulky definition" since by 2000 the name "Chinatown", still used in the 1980s and 1990s, "was no longer apt."

In 2008, the management district and its namethedistrict.com website asked for suggestions for a new name for the district. Suggestions included "the Warehouse District", referring to the abandoned warehouses, and "Saint E", after St. Emanuel Street, a key street and the location of several bars and clubs. The district selected "EaDo", short for "East Downtown", one of the three most popular suggestions for the name of the district.

During the same year Dan Nip, a developer and East Downtown Management District board member, encouraged people to invest in Old Chinatown; international developers who invested $500,000 United States dollars in the Old Chinatown and subsequently created two jobs for ten years would become eligible for a EB-5 visa. By late 2009 the East Downtown authority began re-branding the district to reflect its current name. By 2010 a community of artists began to form in EaDo.

By the 2020s few Asian businesses remained, with several current and former retail sites slated for demolition due to the North Houston Highway Improvement Project.

The Houston FIFA Fan Festival for the 2026 FIFA World Cup was held in the area.

== Venues ==
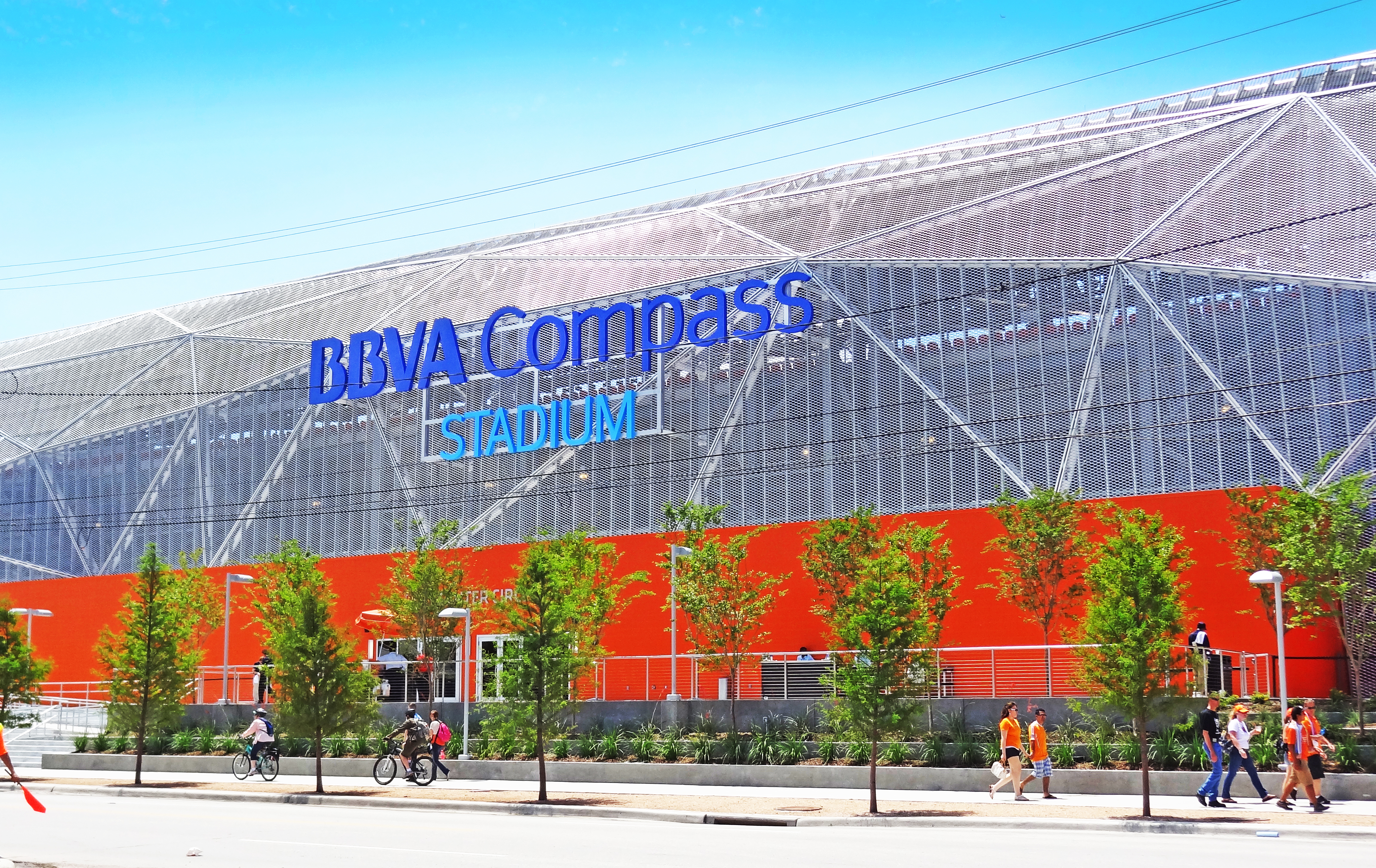
East facade along Emancipation Avenue

Shell Energy Stadium is home for the Houston Dynamo and the Texas Southern University football team, which is on a tract of land bordered by Texas, Walker, Emancipation and Hutchins in East Downtown. BBVA Compass is the first soccer-specific stadium in MLS to be located in a Downtown area. The stadium seats 22,039 and besides hosting soccer and football events will hold other events such as concerts and boxing matches.

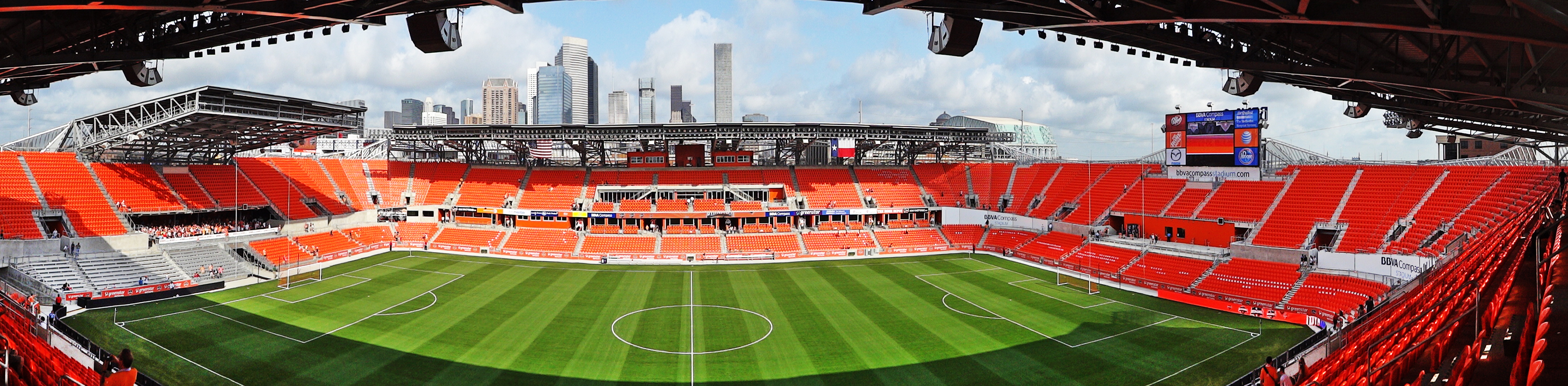
Shell Energy Stadium in East Downtown Houston

== Cityscape ==
It is located southwest of the Second Ward.

Helen Anders of the Austin American-Statesman said that EaDo "looks like an art installation, with the steamshiplike George R. Brown Convention Center as a backdrop, skyscrapers lurking in the background and angular new condos set against low-slung warehouses, some of them still in use for industrial storage."

Historically many of the Hispanic residents lived in small houses. The opening of the BBVA Compass Park and Daikin Park encouraged development of EaDo, and by 2015 many of the older houses were being replaced by townhouses with wealthier occupants.

== Economy ==
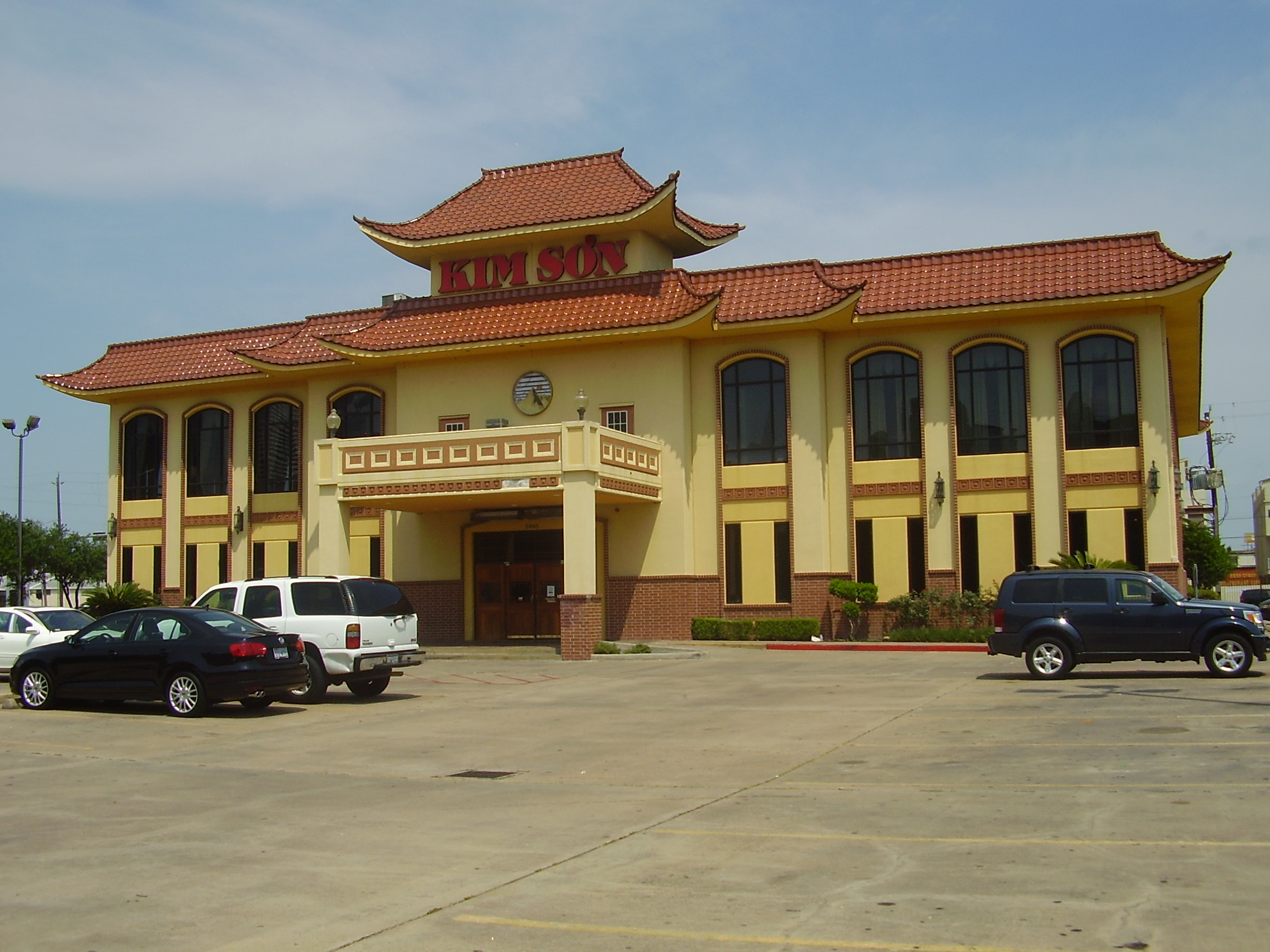
Kim Sơn restaurant

The Kim Sơn headquarters and restaurant is located in East Downtown.

What is now EaDo has the former U.S. headquarters of Schlumberger. It uses an Art Deco style. At one point the building became vacant. Circa 2013, Gaurav Khandelwal and Apurva Sanghavi, then the owners, planned to establish retail stores and offices there, but did not do so. In 2016 David Denenburg acquired the building; he announced plans to restore it and add retail.

== Culture ==
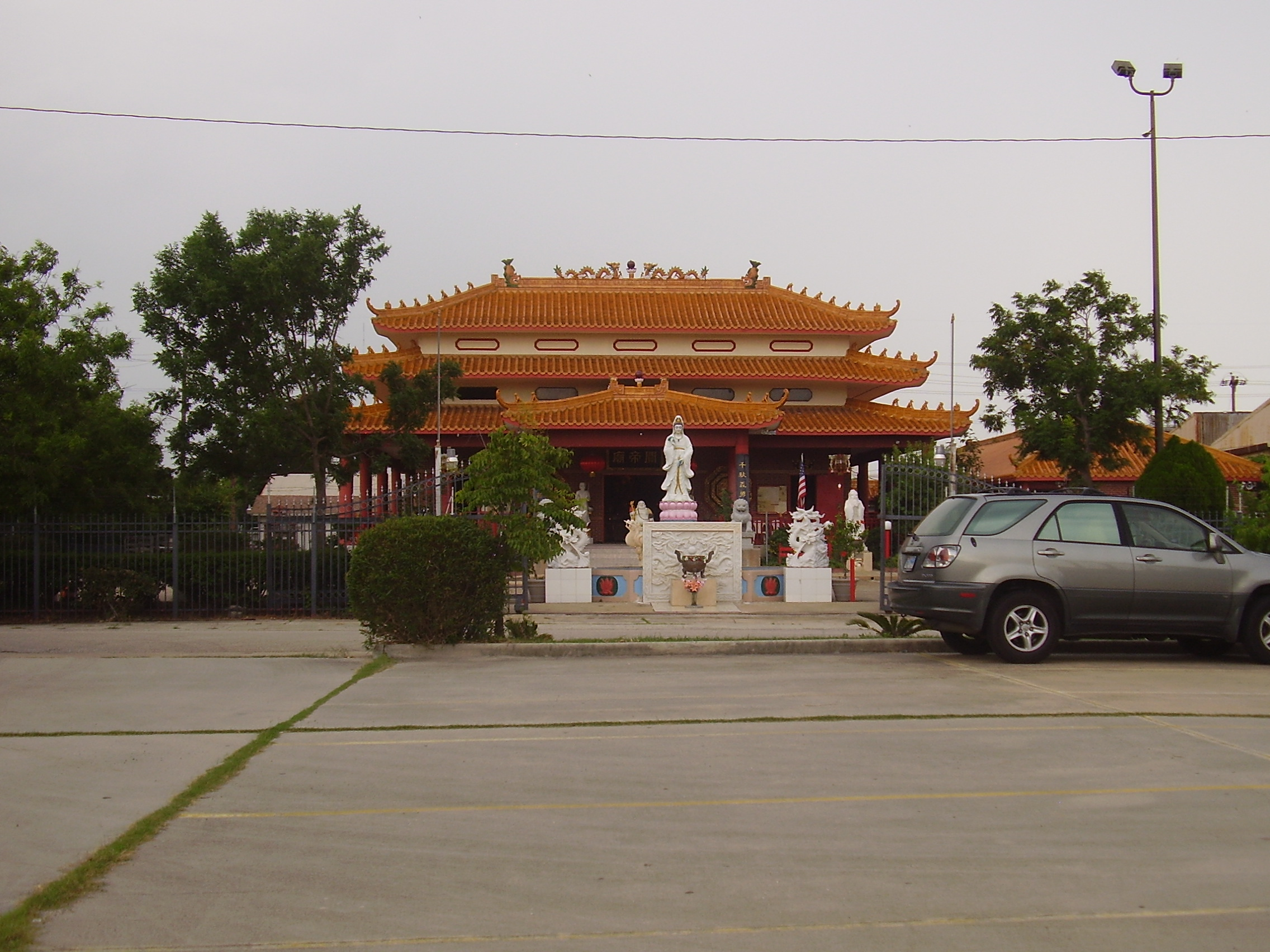
Texas Guandi Temple

The Texas Guandi Temple is located in East Downtown. The temple was established in 1999 by a Vietnamese couple, Charles Loi Ngo and Carolyn. They decided to build a temple to Guan Yu (Guandi) after surviving an aggravated robbery at their store in Fifth Ward. They believed that Guandi saved their lives during the incident. A Vietnamese refugee named Charles Lee coordinated the donations and funding so the temple could be built; Lee stated his motivation was to thank the United States for welcoming him and saving his life when he arrived in 1978. The temple is open to followers of all religions, and it has perfumed halls.

The Chinese Cultural Center was in Old Chinatown. Dolph Briscoe, Governor of Texas, attended the opening of the facility.

Over a dozen popular bars reside in the compact district.

=== Homeless population ===
The district has long been known for having a relatively large homeless population. Many of the homeless in the Houston area congregate in East Downtown because of the presence of nearby agencies that provide services (which predate the current redevelopment efforts) and several groups that independently provide food, clothing, toiletries, and other items on nearby vacant lots. Nearly all Houston non-profit and faith-based agencies which provide services to the homeless, including food and shelter, are located within Downtown and Midtown. A major shelter for women and children operated by Star of Hope, a faith-based agency, is located on Emancipation Avenue, between Texas & Franklin; the agency operates a men's facility nearby on the west side of US 59, north of Daikin Park.

There has been some tension in recent years between developers who want to revitalize the East Downtown district with commercial and residential projects, and the homeless (and homeless service providers). Some have called for the city of Houston to restrict public sleeping on sidewalks and to regulate charitable serving of food. It remains to be seen whether or not current services to the homeless can continue in East Downtown in the face of ongoing revitalization and redevelopment efforts.

== Government and infrastructure ==
Houston City Council District I covers East Downtown.

Station 10, opened in 1894 in what is now East Downtown; the station relocated to its current location in what is now the new Chinatown and Greater Sharpstown in 1985.

Harris Health System (formerly Harris County Hospital District) designated the Ripley Health Center in the East End for the ZIP code 77003. In 2000 Ripley was replaced by the Gulfgate Health Center. The designated public hospital is Ben Taub General Hospital in the Texas Medical Center.

== Transportation ==
Since 2015, METRORail light rail has served the neighborhood at EaDo/Stadium station via the Green and Purple lines, and the Leeland/Third Ward station via the Purple Line. In addition to light rail, Metropolitan Transit Authority of Harris County (METRO) operates bus service through the area.

== Education ==
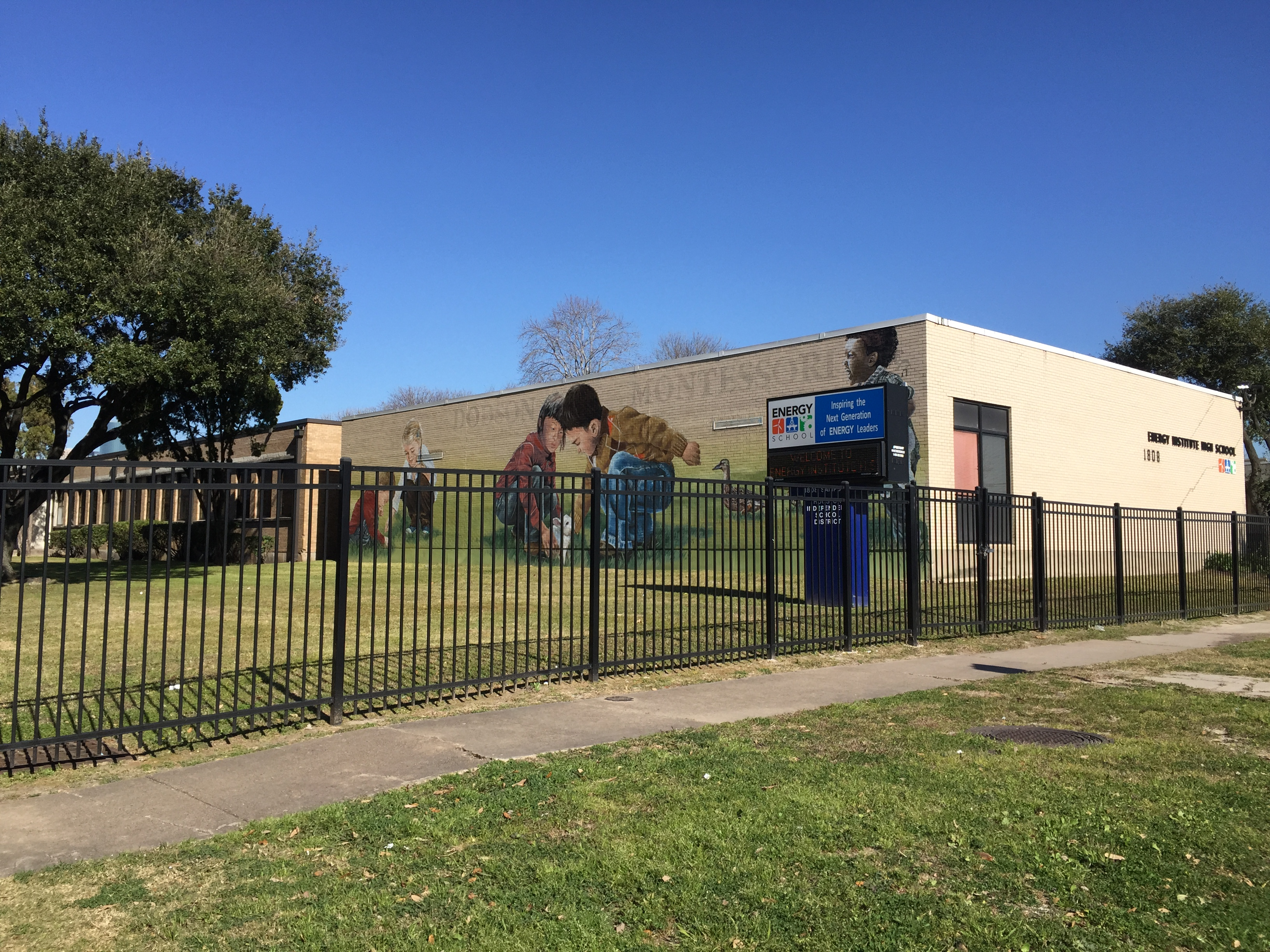
Former Energy Institute High School

The district is within the Houston Independent School District. East Downtown is within Trustee District VIII, represented by Diana Dávila as of 2009.

Lantrip Elementary School, in Eastwood; and Burnet Elementary School, outside of East Downtown, serve separate sections of East Downtown for elementary school.

For grades 6 through 8 Yolanda Black Navarro Middle School of Excellence (formerly Jackson Middle School) serves East Downtown, Austin High School and Wheatley High School serve separate sections of East Downtown.

The magnet high school High School for Law and Justice is in EaDo.

=== Histories of schools ===
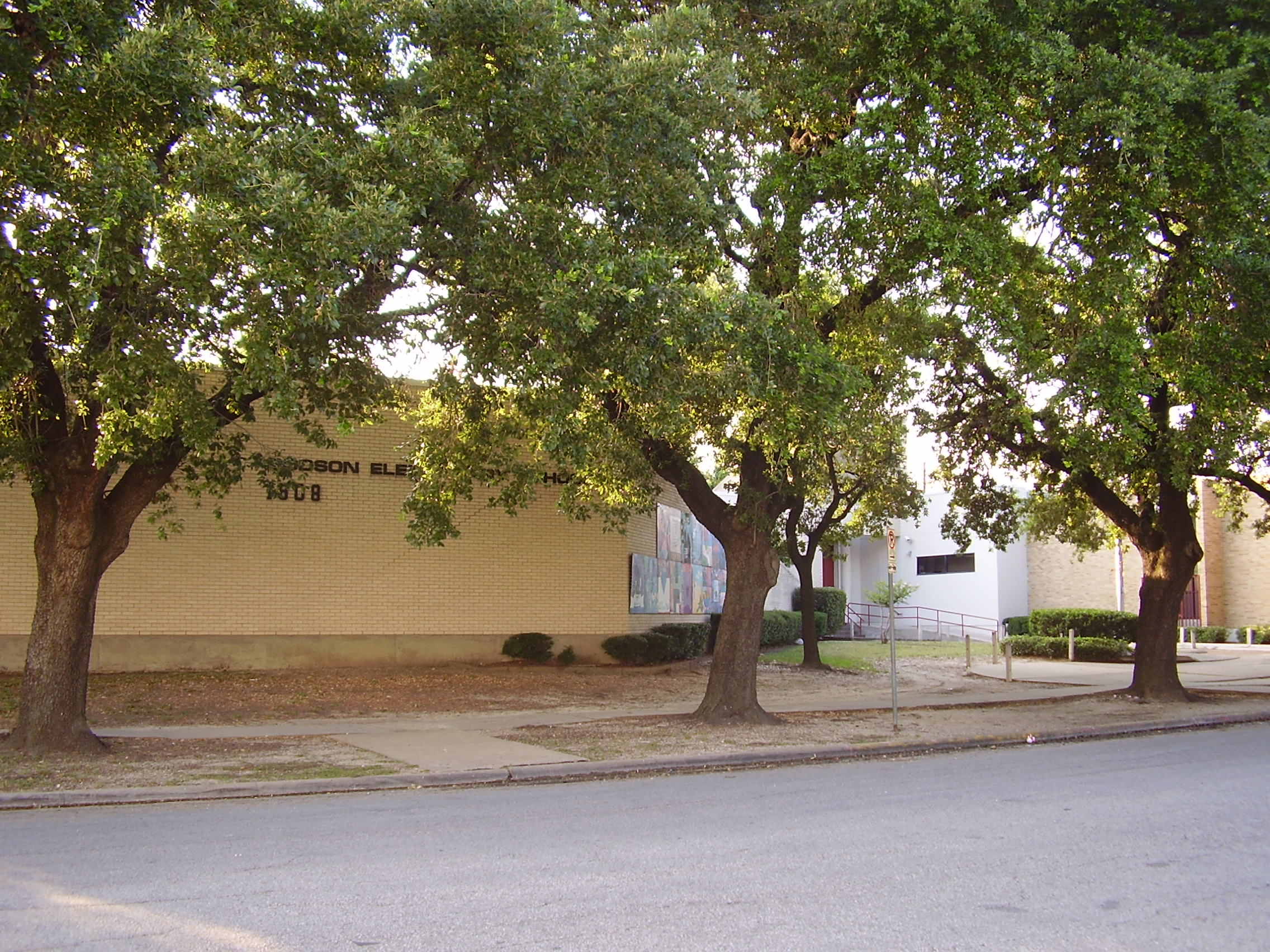
Dodson Elementary School, which at a later time housed Energy Institute

In 1887 St. Nicholas Elementary School at St. Nicholas Church opened, and the school moved with its church to its current location around 1920. A new school building opened on September 8, 1931, with the previous school building, later used by the church itself, razed the previous May 12.

Charles W. Luckie Elementary School, located at 1104 Palmer in what is now East Downtown, was a school for African-Americans. It closed circa 1943.

Dodson Elementary School in EaDo formerly served portions of the community. In 2014 the Dodson school had about 445 students. That year, the HISD school board was to vote on whether to close Dodson Elementary. Terry Grier, the HISD superintendent, argued that Dodson needs to close so another school will be located there while its permanent facility is under construction. On Thursday March 13, 2014, the HISD board voted to close Dodson Elementary 5-4. The Montessori program was scheduled to move to Blackshear Elementary. As part of rezoning for the 2014-2015 school year, some areas in EaDo previously under the Dodson zone were to be moved to the Rusk zone and some were moved to the zone of Lantrip Elementary School. In April 2014 HISD trustee Juliet Stipeche declared that there will be another vote on Dodson's closing. At a later meeting, HISD board member Harvin Moore called for a motion that "the item be tabled indefinitely" meaning the closure is finalized and the matter will not be brought up again; the board voted 5-3 for this matter, and the speakers who were scheduled to speak about the Dodson issue were turned away.

Prior to its closure, Anson Jones Elementary School, outside of East Downtown, served sections of East Downtown. The school, opened in 1892 with its latest campus constructed in 1966, closed in Summer 2006. E. O. Smith Education Center, which formerly served EaDo for middle school, closed after the 2010-2011 school year; East Downtown was rezoned to Jackson.

Energy Institute High School, a magnet school, was formerly in the former Dodson Elementary School in EaDo, where it moved in the summer of 2014. In 2018 it moved to its current Third Ward campus.

Previously Rusk School, outside of East Downtown, was a zoned elementary school serving sections of East Downtown. In 1995 Rusk had a student mobility rate of almost 100% because it had a very large homeless population. Rusk had a science and technology magnet program for middle school students. Beginning in the 2016-2017 school year the elementary zoned grades at Rusk began to be phased out. Most of EaDo became zoned to Lantrip with a small portion zoned to Burnet Elementary School in the East End. PreKindergarten through grade were phased out immediately, with 3-5 being phased out in the following five years; elementary grades for Rusk were to be phased out by fall 2019.

== Religion ==
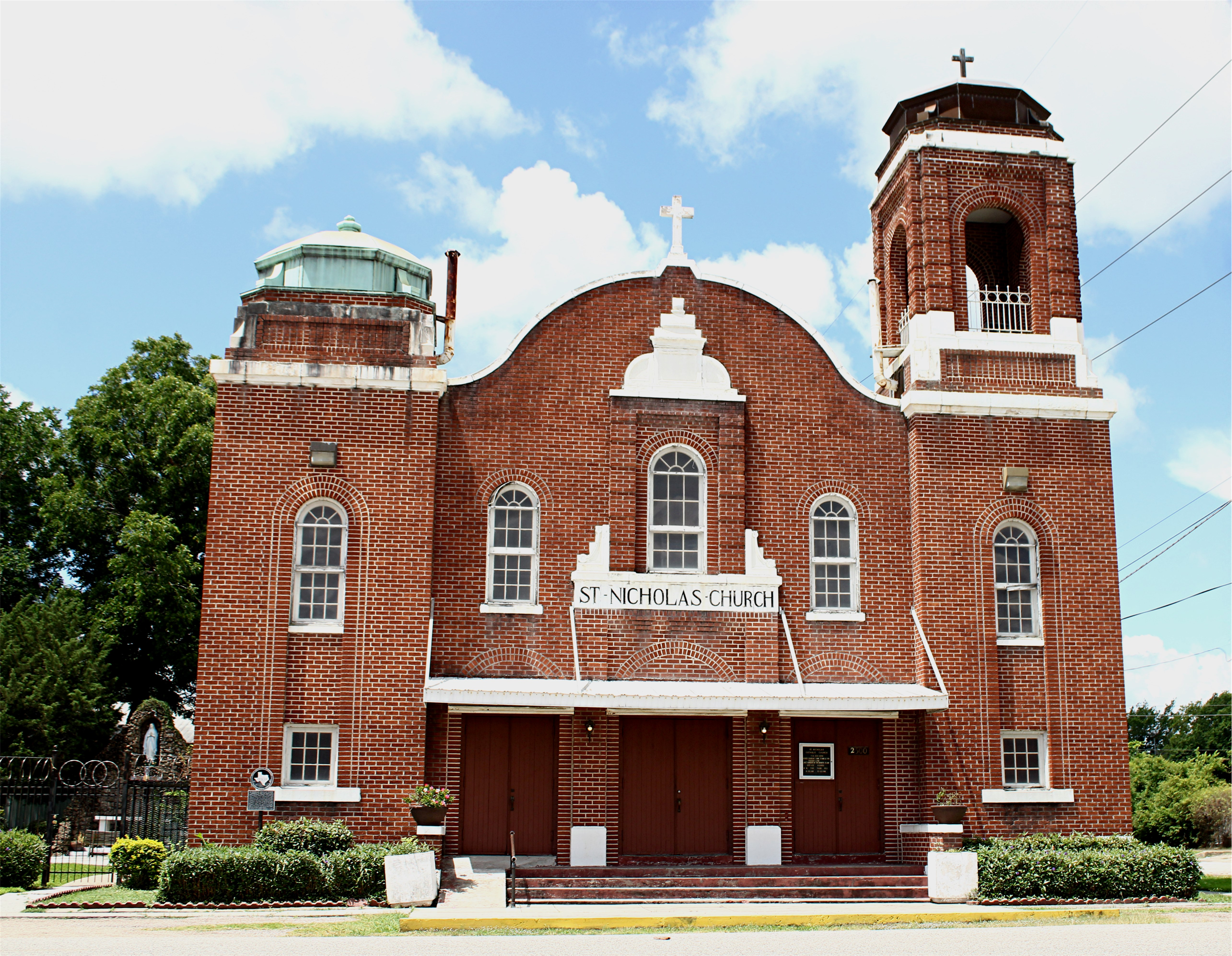
St. Nicholas Catholic Church

The Roman Catholic Archdiocese of Galveston-Houston maintains St. Nicholas Church in East Downtown. It is Houston's oldest black Catholic church. It is/was considered to be in the Third Ward. By 2012 the church held Swahili masses due to it gaining African immigrant parishioners. In particular it has a group of Cameroonians in the congregation served by the Assumption Cameroonian Catholic Community, so it has services each month tailored to that group. In 2013 the church had experienced multiple instances of copper theft.

The archdiocese also maintains the Catholic Charismatic Center in EaDo.

== See also ==
- History of the Chinese-Americans in Houston
