= Open New York =

Pro-housing advocacy organization in New York City

- Formation: 2017
- Type: 501(c)(4) organization
- Purpose: Pro-housing advocacy
- Headquarters: New York
- Region served: New York metropolitan area
- Key people: Amelia Josephson (President); Annemarie Gray (Executive Director)
- Affiliations: YIMBY movement
- Website: opennewyork.org

Open New York (ONY) is a New York-based non-profit advocacy organization focused on addressing metropolitan New York's housing shortage by increasing the rate of housing production in the city and region. Part of the broader "YIMBY" (Yes In My Back Yard) movement, the group advocates for the lifting of exclusionary zoning restrictions and reforms to zoning regulations to enable more residential homebuilding in what it terms "high-opportunity" areas near job centers and transit with high incomes.

== History ==
The group was started, initially under the name More New York, in late 2016 by a group of New Yorkers who had attended the first annual YIMBYTown Conference in 2016 in Boulder, Colorado and, noting the success of YIMBY groups elsewhere in the country, were inspired to start a similar movement in New York. Several members had been spurred to act by following the fight over the redevelopment of the Long Island College Hospital, where neighborhood opposition to a rezoning action that would have enabled the creation of affordable housing and other community amenities resulted in a smaller as-of-right development with fewer units and no affordable housing, and felt that the public participation process unduly favored a vocal anti-development minority.

The group was registered as a 501(c)(4) non-profit organization in 2020. As of July 2021 the president of Open New York's seven-member board of directors, drawn primarily from the non-profit sector, was Amelia Josephson, of the Financial Health Network. In 2021 it hired its first executive director, William Thomas, a former board member, following a fundraising matching campaign in which it raised approximately $150,000. In October 2022, Annemarie Gray, a former housing policy adviser in the de Blasio and Adams administrations, joined as Executive Director. This followed a $1 million, two-year grant from the Open Philanthropy Project, and an additional $500,000 to support state-level activities.

== Activities ==
Open New York's activities have been oriented around advocacy in favor of individual projects in "high-opportunity" areas, larger neighborhood-wide rezonings, and changes to city and state-wide policy, rooted in a market-based theory of change whereby increasing housing supply, both market-rate and subsidized affordable housing, would ease upwards pressure on prices. One of the first major projects in which the organization was involved was in 2018, advocating for the construction of 80 Flatbush, a 900-unit mixed-use development in Downtown Brooklyn, arguing that as a project in an "optimal spot for new housing" it would enable the area to continue to "provide an accessible path to opportunity", and that critics were chiefly "wealthy homeowners who, at best, seek to maintain the aesthetics of the neighborhood, their views, parking, and property values". The project was ultimately approved, albeit with a reduction in height, the organization was credited with organizing around and providing what a staffer at the Regional Plan Association described as a previously unheard "grassroots voice" in favor of residential development, backed by economic and mainstream urban planning theory but which had lacked a "natural constituency" in the land use process aside from developers themselves.

ONY was involved in the proposed redevelopment of the Elizabeth Street Garden, a privately run community garden on city-owned land in Nolita, into a 123-unit affordable senior housing project, the organization's chair at the time describing the project in 2019 as enabling "seniors... [to] live a dignified life in the city they have called home for so long instead of feeling trapped in inaccessible walkups" in a neighborhood which, according to the local councilwoman, Margaret Chin, had seen only 70 units of affordable housing built in the preceding decade. While it did not take a stance on the ultimately failed proposal to build Amazon HQ2 in Long Island City, members called for the construction of additional affordable housing in the neighborhood and region to accommodate new workers, and, once it was cancelled, for the previous plans to build 6,000 homes on the what was the HQ2 site to be re-adopted.

The group has also pushed for wider policy changes such as legalizing accessory dwelling units (ADUs) and abolishing parking minimums. It has also organized around preventing the closure of homeless shelters, particularly on New York's Upper West Side.

=== SoHo-NoHo rezoning ===
Since 2019 the organization's most prominent initiative has been championing a proposed rezoning of SoHo and NoHo to increase the allowable amount of housing in the two neighborhoods. Following a city-led public consultation process on the future of the area, whose zoning still reflected the area's industrial heritage rather than its present mix of residential and commercial uses, ONY proposed a rezoning that would produce 3,400 additional housing units, nearly 700 of which would be affordable. The process had not previously focused on housing, and in January 2020 Mayor Bill de Blasio had told WNYC's Brian Lehrer that he doubted a residential rezoning of SoHo and NoHo could be accomplished before the end of his term in December 2021.

In October 2020, the group put out an open letter urging City Hall to take up the rezoning; the letter was signed by nearly two dozen community organizations including the Citizens Housing and Planning Council, the Regional Plan Association, and Habitat for Humanity. Later that month, the de Blasio administration announced that it would propose a rezoning in the form of the SoHo-NoHo Neighborhood Plan, which was very similar to the initial plan proposed by ONY, with 3,200 new residential units and up to 800 affordable units. Critics suggested that the ONY-led campaign for a residential rezoning had spurred a previously reluctant mayor to act, noting that real estate industry groups like the Real Estate Board of New York (REBNY), the city's largest real estate trade organization, had shown no interest in a rezoning of SoHo and NoHo.

As of September 2021 the rezoning was still pending approval, and the group was calling for a reduction in the commercial floor area ratio (FAR) proposed in the rezoning plan in favor of residential FAR, in order to incentivize homebuilding instead of office development. In December 2021 the rezoning was approved.

=== Political activities ===
In 2021, Open New York issued its first political endorsements, for eight candidates, all Democrats, for the New York City Council, whom it believed best supported its pro-housing agenda. Four of the eight—Shaun Abreu, Pierina Sanchez, Althea Stevens, and Marjorie Velázquez—won their races.

In 2024, the group launched the "Abundant New York" Super PAC and spent $250,000 in state legislative races that year. The group announced that they plan to spend at least $500,000 in the 2025 New York City Council election, backing 8 incumbents as well as 4 challengers and prioritizing six of the most competitive primary elections: Shahana Hanif in the 39th, Ben Wetzler in the 4th, Jess Coleman in the 1st, Elsie Encarnacion in the 8th, Pierina Sanchez in the 14th, and Shirley Aldebol in the 13th.
