= Lena Alhusseini =

American activist

- Education: New York University; Regis University
- Occupations: Head of Middle East and North Africa/Syria at the International Commission of Missing Persons

Lena Alhusseini is the Head of Middle East and North Africa/Syria at the International Commission of Missing Persons. She was previously the director of Oregon's child welfare program, and before that she was executive director of the Arab-American Family Support Center.

== Education ==
Lena Alhusseini holds a master’s degree in Public Administration from New York University and an MSc degree in Information Technology Engineering from Regis University.

== Career ==
Alhusseini served as the Executive Director of the Arab-American Family Support Center, a New York City settlement house. She also co-founded the Khalil Gibran International Academy. In 2011 US President Barack Obama named her a "Champion of Change for Domestic Violence Awareness," becoming one of fifteen nominees selected by the White House. Through her work with the Center, Alhusseini focused on helping domestic violence survivors in the New York City area, as well as other family issues within the Arab-American New York City community. This included working with educational groups and schools to work against anti-Islamic and anti-Arab discrimination, as well as employment issues for new immigrants and their overall integration into American society. She has also worked for USAID, UNICEF, and the National Center for Missing and Exploited Children.

In November 2016, Alhusseini was named the director of Oregon's child welfare program. She resigned in May 2017, citing a lack of management infrastructure that would allow the head of the department to execute their job properly. Upon leaving, she advised the State of Oregon to improve its connections with the communities it serves, so that its services can become more efficient.
