= Debbie Almontaser =

American schoolteacher & principal

Debbie Almontaser is an American schoolteacher and community activist of Yemeni descent. She was the founding principal of the Khalil Gibran International Academy, a New York Arab-themed public school, named after the Christian Arab poet Khalil Gibran.

== Biography ==
Almontaser founded and is a former principal of the Khalil Gibran International Academy. A veteran of New York City's public school system, she taught special education, trained teachers in literacy, and served as a multicultural specialist and diversity advisor. She co-designed a curriculum for the Muslim Communities Project at Columbia University and for Educators for Social Responsibility/Metro. In addition, she has contributed a chapter in The Day Our World Changed: Children's Art of 9/11 for New York University's Child Study Center and the Museum of the City of New York and in Forever After: New York City Teachers on 9/11 for Teachers College Press as well as articles and essays in several magazines.

As of September 2016, Almontaser is the president of the Muslim Community Network.

== Controversy ==
Almontaser was forced by the Department of Education and the Mayor of the City of New York to resign after a controversy arose over a T-shirt created by Arab Women Active in the Arts and Media, an organization that ran its youth program from office space at Saba: The Association of Yemeni Americans, of which Almontaser is a board member. The T-shirt had the words, "Intifada NYC" on it, which, according to the New York Post, was "apparently a call for a Gaza-style uprising in the Big Apple".

In an interview with the same newspaper, she was asked the Arabic root word of the word "intifada". She explained that the word "comes from the root word that means 'shaking off'. That is the root word if you look it up in Arabic." To a follow-up comment that the girls at AWAAM are planning a Gaza-style uprising, she added that she understood that "it is developing a negative connotation due to the uprising in the Palestinian-Israeli areas" and that she does not "believe the intention is to have any of that kind of [violence] in New York City." The Post quoted her as saying, "I think it's pretty much an opportunity for girls to express that they are part of New York City society... and shaking off oppression." The "it's" in her statement referred to the training the girls received at this youth program. She denied using the phrase "shaking off oppression" and a federal appeals court ruled that the Post had quoted her "incorrectly and misleadingly."

Shortly thereafter, the NYC Board of Education issued the following statement on Almontaser's behalf, purportedly without her authorization: "By minimizing the word's historical associations I implied that I condone violence and threats of violence.... That view is anathema to me and the very opposite of my life's work."

On August 9, 2007, Randi Weingarten, then Head of the United Federation of Teachers (the NYC teachers' union), as well as Chancellor Klein and Mayor Bloomberg, demanded Almontaser's resignation by 8:00 the next morning threatening to nix the school if she did not resign. The full account was highlighted in a frontpage New York Times article, "Critics Cost Muslim Educator Her Dream Job".

In a New York Times article, journalism professor Samuel G. Freedman wrote, "For anyone who bothered to look for it, Almontaser left a clear, public record of interfaith activism and outreach across the boundaries of race, ethnicity and religion. Her efforts, especially after the September 11 attacks, earned her honors, grants and fellowships. She has collaborated so often with Jewish organizations that an Arab-American newspaper, Aramica, castigated her earlier this summer for being too close to a 'Zionist organization,' meaning the Anti-Defamation League. Almontaser has twice been profiled on Voice of America as an accomplished Muslim American."

In 2004 Almontaser received the Revson Fellowship award for her contributions to City life. Almontaser told her story in her own words on WNYC's The Brian Lehrer Show and Democracy Now!

Brooklyn Borough President, Marty Markowitz expressed support for Almontaser, calling for her to be reinstated, noting Almontaser "was dumped on, and she doesn't deserve it" and that he has "witnessed her work, bringing Muslims and Jews and other religions together." Then New York City Councilman John Liu noted that the Department of Education "and this administration acted totally irresponsibly and violated the trust placed in them in what they allowed to happen to Debbie Almontaser."

Along with local politicians, there was an outpouring of community support for Almontaser, with hundreds of individuals and organizations signing statements in support of Almontaser and the Khalil Gibran International Academy (KGIA). A diverse community group called Communities in Support of the Khalil Gibran International Academy (CISKGIA) formed in order to show support for the school as well as Almontaser's rights. The group maintains that KGIA requires more and better support from the Department of Education and New Visions in order to succeed, and it was a strong voice for Debbie Almontaser's reinstatement throughout the controversy.

CISKGIA organized an event celebrating the original vision of the school on January 29, 2008, in which a few hundred people attended to support Almontaser and the school that she envision with her design team that were honored that evening, and maintains an informational website. In 2011, the group noted with disappointment the downsizing of the school as a sign of the lack of political support about which it had warned. A film called Shouting Fire: Stories from the Edge of Free Speech from HBO Films uses Almontaser's case as an example of a violation of the First Amendment rights.

== Subsequent legal action ==
On November 19, 2007, Almontaser brought a lawsuit claiming that in forcing her to resign because of her interview with the New York Post and denying her the opportunity to be considered for the position of permanent principal at the Khalil Gibran International Academy, the Department of Education violated her First Amendment rights.

On February 5, 2008, Almontaser requested for the U.S. Court of Appeals for the Second Circuit in New York to grant her a preliminary injunction to force the board of education to give her an interview for the job of principal. On March 20, the court rejected her request and sent it back to the trial court. The judgment cited that when she was instructed to speak to the press, she was mandated not to speak about the T-shirts. She had made statements during the phone call such as "I think [the t-shirts are] pretty much an opportunity for girls to express that they are part of New York City society." Her claim was reportedly rejected based on the precedent-setting "Garcetti v. Ceballos", which said that the First Amendment does not apply to public employees in the pursuit of their official duties.

On March 3, 2008, she filed an amended complaint in her federal lawsuit and a charge with the Equal Opportunity Employment Commission, both of which assert that Department of Education (DOE) officials discriminated against her on the basis of race, religion, and national origin. The judge rejected Almontaser's claim.

In March 2010, the Equal Employment Opportunity Commission (EEOC) ruled Almontaser had been unfairly discriminated against and urged the Department of Education to consider reinstating Almontaser, paying her back wages, legal fees, and damages of $300,000. Despite the findings of the EEOC, Almontaser announced that she would not sue the Department of Education, citing the personal costs of pursuing a lawsuit over a number of years.

== Personal life and community activism ==
According to the Jewish Week, Almontaser invited hundreds of Jews and Christians to her own home after the 9/11 attack. She had joined organizations to form social action groups, such as "We Are All Brooklyn", an interethnic initiative supported by the Jewish Community Relations Council, to combat hate crimes in Brooklyn. She trained with the Anti-Defamation League's anti-bias program, "A World of Difference", as a facilitator for diversity training and inter-group dynamics in the public schools.

Almontaser has conducted sensitivity training and presentations in Churches, Synagogues and other houses of worship. She also has worked as a liaison between the Muslim community and the NYPD.

Almontaser received the Pax Christi Metro New York 2008 Peacemaker Award, and the annual Jews for Racial and Economic Justice's Rabbi Marshall T. Meyer Risk-Taker Award, in 2007.

== Sources ==
- AOL news
