= Energy Institute High School =

Public high school in Texas, United States

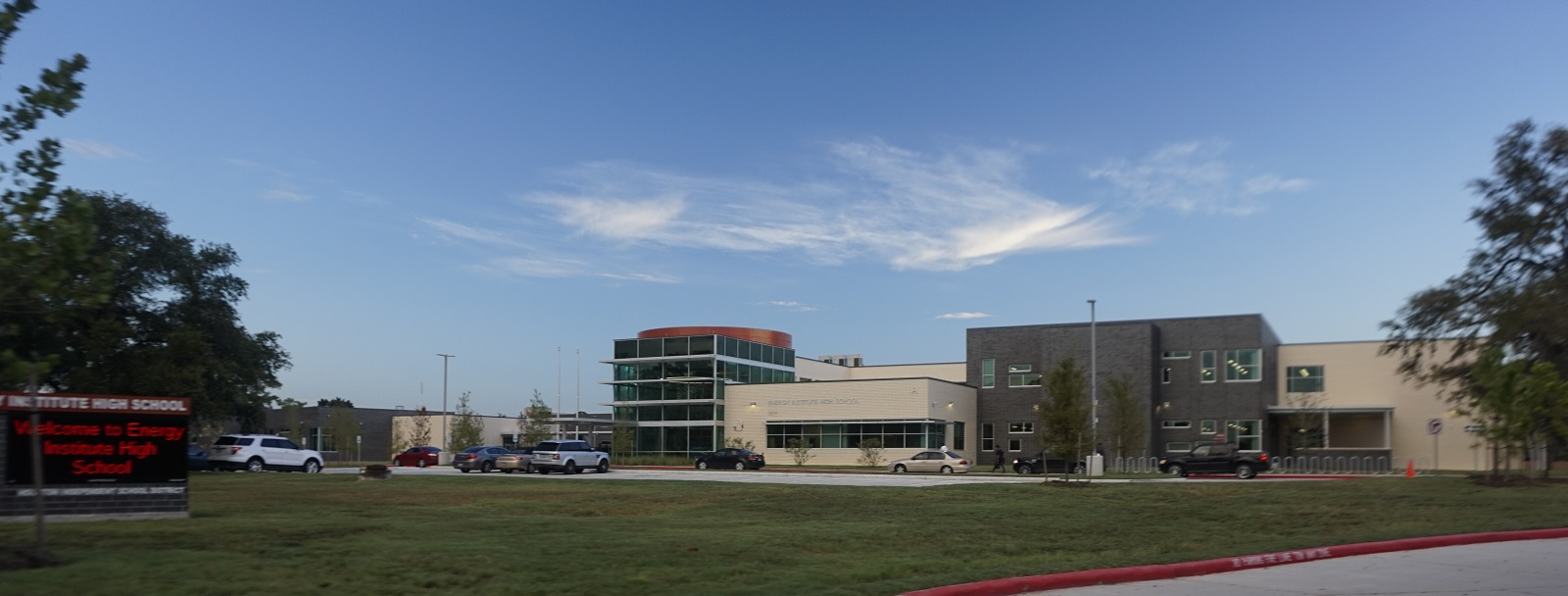

Location
- 3501 Southmore Blvd; Houston, Texas 77004; United States; 29.714552°N 95.358789°W

Information
- Type: Public high school
- School district: Houston Independent School District
- Principal: Elizabeth Harris
- Faculty: 60
- Grades: 9-12
- Enrollment: 696 (2021-2022)
- Website: https://energyinst.houstonisd.org/

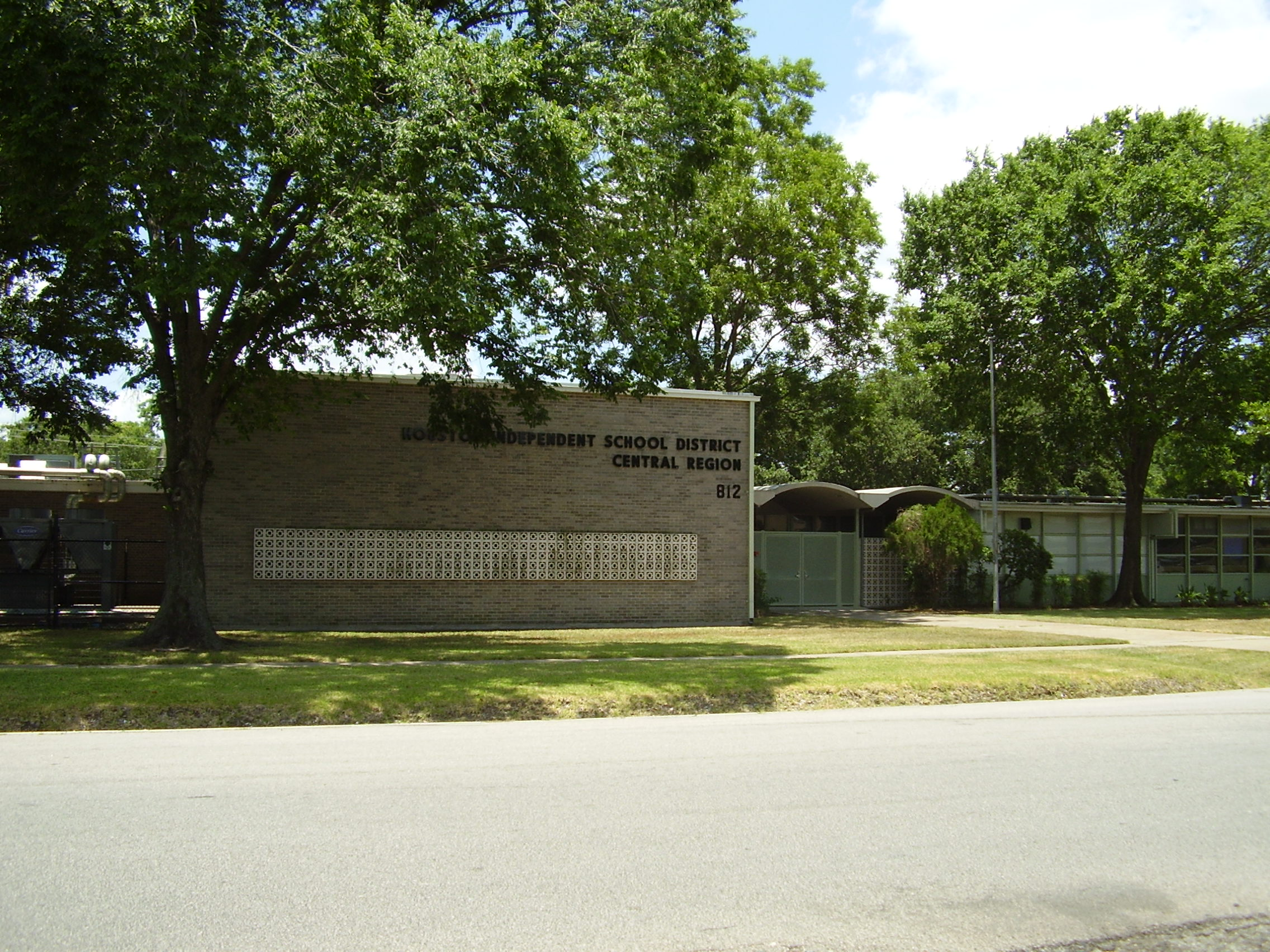
The HISD Central Region Office, the former Holden Elementary, initially housed Energy Institute (it was later the Arabic Immersion Magnet School)

Energy Institute High School (EIHS) is a magnet high school in the Third Ward area in Houston, Texas. It is a part of the Houston Independent School District and is the first high school in the United States that focuses on the energy industry.

== History ==
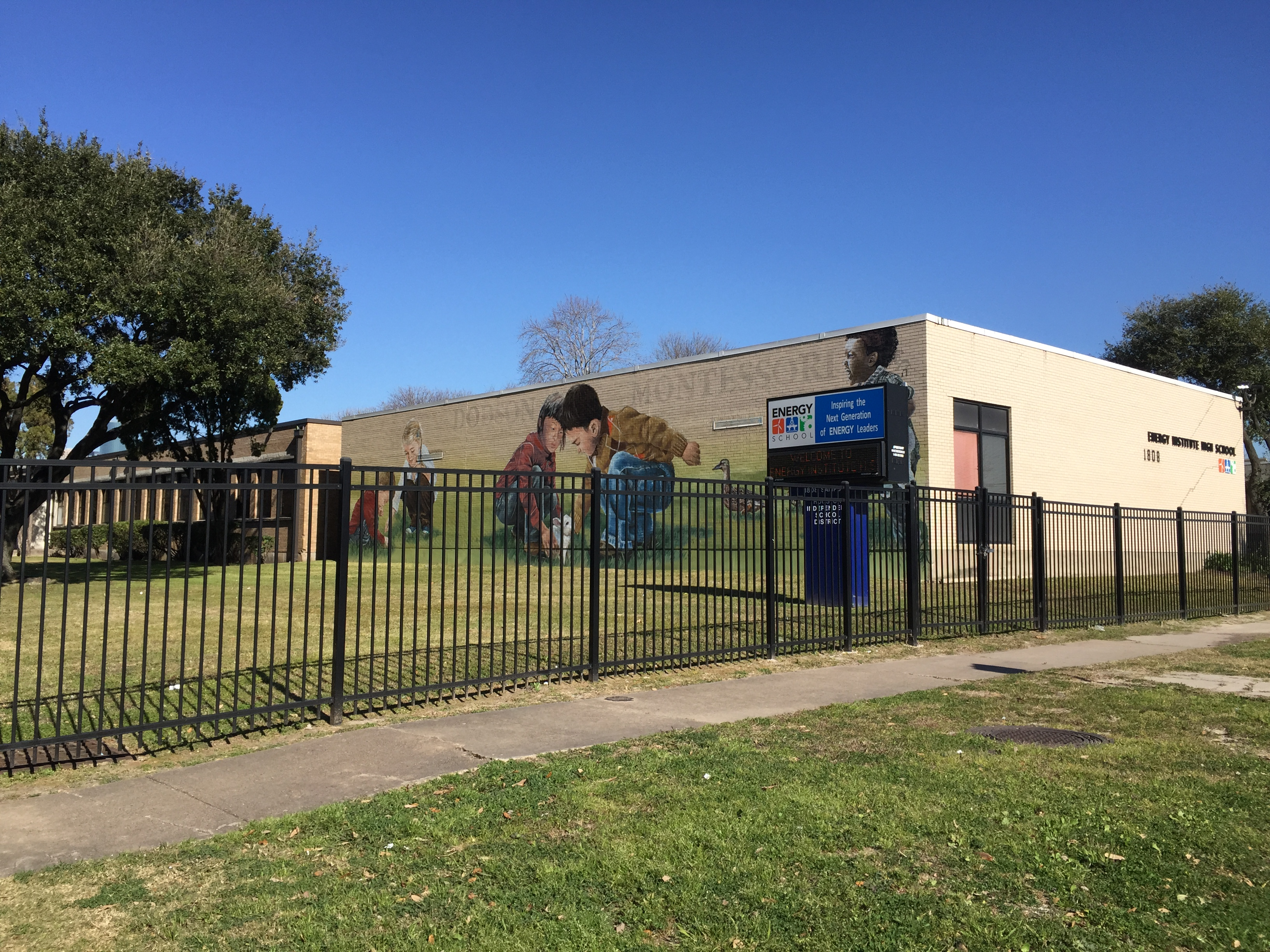
Previous campus at the former Dodson Elementary School in East Downtown

The district announced that the school would be created in the spring of 2013. It opened in the former Holden Elementary School in the Houston Heights. There were 650 applicants for 217 slots in the 2014-2015 9th grade class. Circa December 2013, its waiting list had about fifty students.

In 2014 many area corporations offered assistance to the Energy Institute, such as the Independent Petroleum Association of America, which partnered with the school to provide mentors, field trips and monthly guest speakers. The school was later located in the former Dodson Elementary School in East Downtown. It had moved there in the summer of 2014. Dodson Elementary was formerly the second-largest elementary school serving the Third Ward. The Arabic Immersion Magnet School opened in the former Holden/Energy Institute facility in the fall of 2015.

The current campus opened in 2018.

== Operations ==
The school focuses on project-based learning. This basically means that the learning style is all based on projects. Students practice their presentation skills, leadership skills and team-working skills.

== Campuses ==
In order to emulate a corporate setting, the school district arranged for the school-style desks at Holden to be replaced with tables, and the regular walls were replaced with glass. Each classroom has a 70-inch (1,800 mm) television that is connected to the internet. The district also used this design at the former Dodson.

VLK Architects Inc. designed the current campus, and Anslow Bryant Construction Ltd. constructed the project. The groundbreaking for the current campus was held on November 19, 2016. The dedication ceremony was held on September 19, 2018. This 116-square-foot (10.8 m^{2}) building was built to hold about 813 students on 12 acres of land located along Southmore Boulevard at Tierwester. VLK planned and designed the $37 million school based on professional corporate and industry settings. The school is designed for collaboration and focused study with three main multi-level buildings for project-based learning areas as well as a main courtyard to enlarge learning and social space. When the campus was first developed, there were concerns that it would not have enough parking space for staff and students, and that this would put pressure on parking spaces in the surrounding community. While the Houston municipal code would have normally required 647 parking spaces, HISD had asked for special permission to put in 357 parking spots.

== Corporate Partnerships ==
As a 21st-century school, Energy Institute focuses on maintaining corporate partnerships to host field trips, provide guest speakers, and fund student activities. Partnerships include:

- BP
- BSEE
- Chevron
- ExxonMobil
- FMC Technologies
- IPAA/PESA
- Hasty-Bake
- HEB Tournament of Champions
- Lyondell Basell
- NASA
- Phillips 66
- Schlumberger
- Shell
- Texas Workforce Commission
- Noble Energy

== Curriculum ==
In order to earn the STEM and Multidisciplinary endorsements, all students are required to complete four years of engineering coursework as part of their elective credits. Students are offered 16 Pre-AP/Honors courses and 19 AP courses. The school is a project-based learning school, meaning that it does not rely on standard school testing. Instead, it relies more heavily on the use of group work projects.

== Student body ==
Energy Institute High School is a diverse school that draws in students from nearly all zip codes in the Houston ISD area. The school attracts students from charter schools, private schools, and home schooling as well as from other Houston ISD middle schools. The most recent demographic report available lists the school's demographics as 3.3% Asian, 24.1% African American, 44% Hispanic, 25.4% White, 3.2% other. The school mirrors the city demographics well. The school has a 59.8% economically disadvantaged population.
