= Khalil Gibran School Rabat =

Khalil Gibran School

Location
- Rabat; Morocco
- Coordinates: 33.96284°N 6.82931°W

Information
- Opened: 1986
- Grades: Preschool to 12th grade
- Gender: Male and female
- Age range: 4-18
- Language: English, Arabic, French
- Website: https://www.kgs-rabat.ma/

Khalil Gibran School (KGS) is a Moroccan and British English International School in Rabat, Morocco founded in 1986. The school is named after Lebanese artist, poet, and writer Khalil Gibran. KGS caters to children from ages 4 to 18 years old (pre-school to 12th grade). The curriculum is a combination of Moroccan and British programs offering a fully tri-lingual, (Arabic, English, French) education designed to prepare students for the global challenges of the 21st century. KGS Rabat is licensed by Cambridge University International Examinations (CIE) in collaboration with the British Council. In 1999, KGS was the first school in the Kingdom to offer the British International General Certificate of Education qualifications (IGCSE). The school is situated in the Soussi suburb of Rabat.

The school was acquired by Inspired Education Group, the leading global group of premium schools operating in Europe, Asia-Pacific, Africa, the Middle East, South and Latin America in 2022.

== Studies ==
Students are prepared for Moroccan national examinations, and international examinations such as the Cambridge Primary Achievement Award, Cambridge Checkpoint, IGCSE (International General Certificate of Secondary Education), A Level and the CIE for schools qualifications (YLEs, KET, PET and FCE). Preparation classes for the American High School diploma are also available. English is the language of instruction for the international subjects. KGS is co-educational and non-residential.

== Students ==
The majority of students are from Morocco, however, 46+ other nationalities currently study there, including:

- Algerian
- American
- Austrian
- Azerbaijani
- Bangladeshi
- Belgian
- Brazilian
- British
- Bulgarian
- Cameroonian
- Canadian
- Chinese
- Dutch
- Emirati
- Filipino
- French
- Gambian
- German
- Indian
- Indonesian
- Iraqi
- Irish
- Italian
- Japanese
- Jordanian
- Korean
- Kuwaiti
- Lebanese
- Libyan
- Mongolian
- Nigerian
- Pakistani
- Russian
- Sultanate of Oman
- Saudi Arabian
- Spanish
- Swedish
- Swiss
- Thai
- Yemeni
