= Gibran Khalil Gibran Garden =

Public garden in Beirut, Lebanon

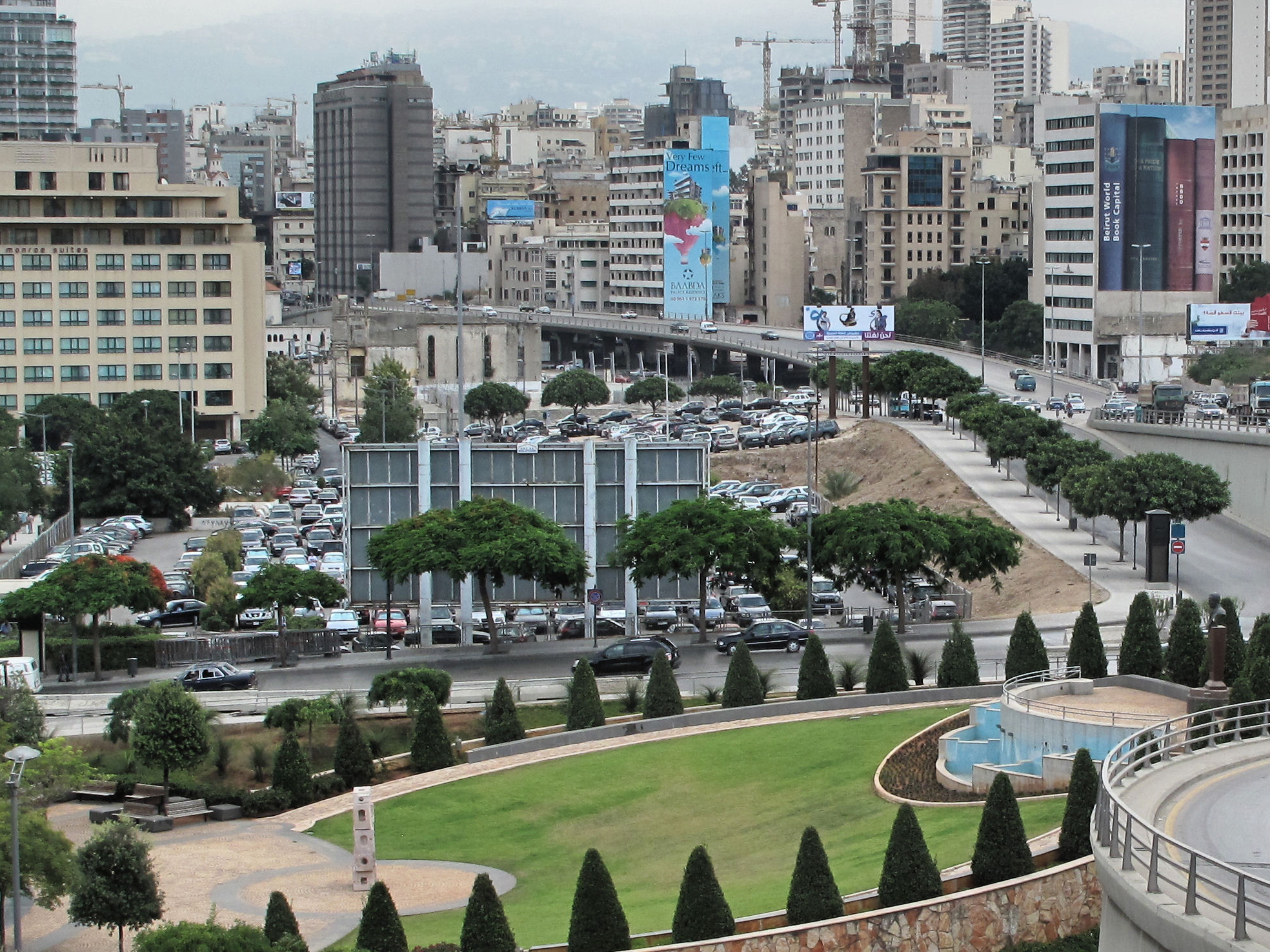
- Location: Beirut, Lebanon
- Coordinates: 33.8942113°N 35.5003362°E
- Area: 6,000 m^{2}

The Gibran Khalil Gibran Garden (Arabic: حديقة جبران خليل جبران) is a 6,000-square-meter public garden in the Centre Ville area of Beirut, Lebanon, facing the UN House, the headquarters of ESCWA, the United Nations Economic and Social Commission for Western Asia.

The garden, which is named in honor of the Lebanese–American writer, poet and visual artist Kahlil Gibran, features two circular lawns, a fountain, and modern sculpture, including a bust of Gibran. The garden is often used as a venue for peaceful and democratic demonstrations and sit-ins.
