= Khalil Gibran International Academy =

Public school in New York City

Location
- 362 Schermerhorn Street; Brooklyn, New York 11217; 40°41′9.4″N 73°58′47.4″W

Information
- School type: Public high school
- Founded: 2007
- School board: New York City Department of Education
- School district: 15
- School number: 592
- Principal: Amanda Hunter
- Grades: 9 - 12
- Enrollment: 263 (February 2017)
- Language: English and Arabic and French
- Accreditation: IB World School
- Website: khalilgibranhs.org

Khalil Gibran International Academy is a public school in Boerum Hill, Brooklyn, New York City, New York that opened in September 2007 with about 60 sixth grade students. As the first English-Arabic public school in the country to offer a curriculum emphasizing the study of Arabic language and culture, it was placed at the center of controversy by opponents. Khalil Gibran, the school's namesake, was a Lebanese-American poet.

The committee that designed the school included the original principal Debbie Almontaser (a former teacher and community activist) and several nonprofit groups, including Lutheran Medical Center, the American-Arab Anti-Discrimination Committee, the Salaam Club of New York, and the lead partner, the Arab American Family Support Center, a Brooklyn-based nonprofit.

Khalil Gibran International Academy transitioned to a public high school in 2012 and became an IB World School in 2015, making it one of the first public schools in NYC to offer the rigorous IB Diploma Programme.

== Premise ==
The school's stated mission includes providing a "multicultural curriculum and intensive Arabic language instruction".

The federal government has said that the country is in critical need of Arabic and Chinese speakers, and grants have been given to schools teaching those languages. Modern Arabic is a dialect continuum with two dozen varieties that might be considered languages in their own right. They are the majority language in 20 countries of the Arab world, which has a population of some 325 million people.

The BBC reports that some attendees have joined to reconnect with their families' culture and homeland; others, with no Arab or Muslim background, because they believe learning the language will give them a valuable skill.

A Brooklyn College professor, Moustafa Bayoumi, says that "It's not uncommon for Arab students to feel isolated — I think [the school is] seen as a foothold" and that he believes that the school is making them feel more at home in the city. One of the founders of the school was Lena Alhusseini.

== History ==
=== Founding controversy ===
The Khalil Gibran International Academy is one of 67 dual language schools in the city of New York; its status as the first US public school focused on Arabic language and culture has made it the target of criticism. Before the school opened, an organization called "Stop the Madrassa" held a protest outside New York's city hall calling for the school to be cancelled. The New York Times reported that KGIA had become the center of controversy as a result of an "organized movement to stop Muslim citizens who are seeking an expanded role in American public life."

Opponents argue that such a school is unnecessary and that creating it promotes non-assimilation; supporters of the school say that the school could improve integration by providing the school community with health services, counseling, youth leadership development, and English as a second language classes for parents.

Daniel Pipes, an adviser to "Stop the Madrassa" and the founder of Campus Watch, has said that as the school is teaching the Arabic language, it needs to be held under a "special scrutiny," adding that "In principle it is a great idea – the United States needs more Arabic-speakers. In practice, however, Arabic instruction is heavy with Islamist and Arabist overtones and demands." Pipes has been roundly criticized for being a "propagandist" of "anti-Arab racism" and for his attacks on academic freedom. Garth Harries, a school official, has denied any religious activities would be taking place: "Religion plays absolutely no part in the school. This is a public school, it wouldn't play a part in any of our schools."

The BBC reported that in searching the Internet they found many hateful messages about the school that conflate the Arabic language, Islam, and terrorism.

=== Changing leadership, structure, and location ===
Founding principal Debbie Almontaser was resigned after controversy erupted in August 2007 when the New York Post attacked her and the school for failing to condemn the word "intifada" in an interview. After Almontaser resigned, she was replaced by an interim principal Danielle Salzberg, who is Jewish and cannot speak Arabic, while a national search for a permanent principal was underway. In January 2008, Holly Anne Reichert was appointed principal. Parents had complained of a chaotic school environment.

On March 16, 2010, Reichert resigned following an EEOC office's determination that Almontaser's rights had been violated in her dismissal. The Department of Education replaced Reichert with Beshir Abdellatif, a secular Muslim from Tunisia, who in filling the Gibran post resigned from Law, Government and Community Service High School in Cambria Heights, Queens, where he had worked since 2008. The New York Times reported: "A lawyer for the founding principal, Debbie Almontaser, a Muslim of Yemeni descent, said he found the timing of the move "curious" and suggested that it was a "cynical ploy" intended to divide supporters of the school and of Ms. Almontaser."

In the second week of April 2011 the Department of Education announced that it would close the middle school, converting it into just a high school and relocating.

In 2017, it was announced that Khalil Gibran International Academy would relocate to 80 Flatbush, a nearby development. Construction would start in 2019 and be completed by 2022-2025. 80 Flatbush was approved by the New York City Council in September 2018. The Khalil Gibran International Academy High School opened in September 2024.

== Academics and school quality ==
According to the NYC Department of Education Quality Review, the school scored "Excellent" or "Good" on "Collaborative Teachers" ,"Trust", "Rigorous Instruction", "Supportive Environment", "Effective School Leadership", and "Strong Family-Community Ties". Research shows that schools strong in the six areas are far more likely to improve student learning.

Extracurricular activities at KGIA include:

Boys Club, IGNITE, ROSE Girls Group, Creative Writing, Hip-Hop and African Dance, Drama and Theater, Track, Gardening Club, Homework Help, After-School Subject Tutoring, Movie Club, Student Council and Student Advisory, Regents Preparation, Yearbook, Baruch College STEP, Saturday Academy.

== See also ==
- Arabic Immersion Magnet School (Arabic magnet school in Houston, Texas)
- Ethnic-culture based charter school
- Tarek ibn Ziyad Academy
- International Baccaleureate Diploma Programme
