= Blind =

Blind often refers to:

- The state of blindness, being unable to see
- A window blind, a covering for a window

Blind may also refer to:

== Arts, entertainment, and media ==
=== Films ===
- Blind, a 1986 documentary film by Frederick Wiseman about the Alabama Institute for Deaf and Blind
- Blind (2007 film), a Dutch drama by Tamar van den Dop
- Blind (2011 film), a South Korean crime thriller
- Blind (2014 film), a Norwegian drama
- Blind (2016 film), an American drama
- Blind (2019 film), an American horror film
- Blind (2023 film), an Indian crime thriller, based on 2011 South Korean film of the same name
- The Blind (film), a 2023 American biographical film about Phil Robertson, directed by Andrew Hyatt

=== Music ===
- Blind (band), Australian Christian rock group founded in 1999
- Blind (rapper), Italian rapper

==== Albums and EPs ====
- Blind (Corrosion of Conformity album), 1991
- Blind (The Icicle Works album), 1988
- Blind (The Sundays album), 1992
- Blind, by Ciipher, 2021
- Blind!, by the Sex Gang Children, 1985

==== Songs ====
- "Blind" (Breed 77 song), 2006
- "Blind" (Feder song), 2015
- "Blind" (Hercules and Love Affair song), 2008
- "Blind" (Hurts song), 2013
- "Blind" (Korn song), 1994
- "Blind" (Lifehouse song), 2005
- "Blind" (SZA song), 2022
- "Blind" (Talking Heads song), 1988
- "Blind", by Ateez from Golden Hour: Part.1, 2024
- "Blind", by Band of Susans from Veil, 1993
- "Blind", by Ciipher, from Blind, 2021
- "Blind", by Company Flow, 1997
- "Blind", by Deep Purple from Deep Purple, 1969
- "Blind", by Enhypen from Orange Blood, 2023
- "Blind", by From Ashes to New from Panic, 2020
- "Blind", by Gomez from Split the Difference, 2004
- "Blind", by Jars of Clay from Jars of Clay, 1995
- "Blind", by Jason Derulo from Jason Derulo, 2010
- "Blind", by John Ireland (1879–1962)
- "Blind", by Kesha from Animal, 2010
- "Blind", by Mary Mary from Something Big, 2011
- "Goin' Blind", by Melvins from Houdini, 1993
- "Blind", by Michael Gira from Drainland, 1995
- "Blind", by Monsta X from The Clan Pt. 2 Guilty, 2016
- "Blind", by Placebo from Meds, 2006
- "Blind", by PrettyMuch, 2019
- "Blind", by the Planet Smashers, 2001
- "Blind", by TV on the Radio from their 2003 EP Young Liars

=== Other uses in arts, entertainment, and media ===
- The Blind (play) (Les Aveugles), a play written in 1890 by the Belgian playwright Maurice Maeterlinck
- The Blind, play by Kahlil Gibran
- Blind (Australian TV series), a 2019 Australian web series
- Blind (South Korean TV series), a 2022 South Korean television series
- Blind (cards), a hand of cards dealt face down that a player may subsequently exchange with
- Blind (poker), a blind bet used for betting in some forms of poker
- "Bl/ind", a company from My Chemical Romance's fourth studio album Danger Days: The True Lives of the Fabulous Killjoys
- Blind (sculpture), a 2021 sculptural work by Maurizio Cattelan

== Electronics, engineering, and science ==
- Blind (app), a chat app
- Blind, a digital signal processing term that indicates ignorance of certain parameters central to a process; e.g., blind deconvolution
- Blind experiment (single-blind or double-blind), a procedure to reduce bias in scientific experiments
- Blind hole, a mechanical engineering term for a hole that does not come out at the other side
- Blind via (electronics), an electrical term used in printed circuit board
- Blinding (cryptography)

== Other uses ==
- Bird blind, also called a "bird hide", used to conceal the observer when watching or photographing birds or other animals
- Hunting blind, used to conceal the observer when watching or hunting birds or other animals
- Blind men and an elephant, a story that originated from the ancient Indian subcontinent
- Blind (munition), a piece of unexploded ordnance that failed to go off when fired
- Blind Skateboards, a skateboard company
- Blind-baking, the process of baking a pie crust or other pastry without the filling
- Blind (surname), list of notable people with the name

== See also ==
- Blind River (disambiguation)
- Blinded (disambiguation)
- Blinds (disambiguation)
