= Naoum Mokarzel =

Lebanese writer and philosopher

- نعوم مكرزل
- Naoum Mokarzel
- Born: August 2, 1864; Freike, Mount Lebanon Mutasarrifate
- Died: April 5, 1932 (aged 67); Paris, France
- Resting place: Freike, Lebanon
- Education: Saint Joseph University, Beirut
- Occupations: Poet, writer, philosopher
- Spouses: Sophie Shishim (1898–1902); Saada Rihani (1904–1908); Rose Abillama (1910–1932)
- Writing career
- Genres: Poetry, parable, short story
- Literary movement: Mahjar, New York Pen League

Naoum Mokarzel (Arabic: نعوم مكرزل / ALA-LC: Naʻūm Mukarzil, sometimes spelled "Naʿum Mukarzil"; 2 August 1864 – 5 April 1932) was an influential intellectual and publisher who immigrated to the United States from the Mount Lebanon Mutasarrifate.

Mokarzel established his first daily publication, Al-ʿAsr (The Epoch) which floundered less than a year after its first issue. He attended medical school for two years before dropping out and became notorious within New York's Arab-speaking community for his aggressive character and controversial demeanor. He engaged in libel and disputes with other immigrants that often became physical and violent. He was arrested on several occasions but was never jailed; his actions stoked politico-sectarian animosity within the Arab-speaking communities of the US.

In 1895 Mokarzel was accused of adultery with a married woman; the two got married and eloped to Philadelphia where, on 22 February 1898, he published the first issue of his second newspaper Al-Hoda (The Guidance). Al-Hoda would grow to become the largest and longest-running Arabic daily newspaper in the United States. In 1902 Mokarzel got divorced, he moved with his brother Salloum back to New York where they set up the newspaper's office. Naoum collaborated with Ameen Rihani who published a regular section in Al-Hoda and he married Rihani's sister, Saada, in 1904. The two men fell out when Mokarzel and Saada divorced and because of political values differences. Mokarzel claimed that his publication was secular but his writings often showed religious bias; he used his publishing house to print and circulate Maronite politics and Lebanese nationalism.

In 1910, Naoum and Salloum adapted the linotype machine to the Arabic script to replace manual typesetting. This contribution paved the way for cheaper and easier publishing for Arabic-speaking communities throughout the world. That same year he married his third wife but he never had children.

Mokarzel was politically engaged and called for the separation of Lebanon from the Ottoman empire. In 1917 he collected more than $30,000 US in donations to relieve the residents of Mount Lebanon during the great famine but he diverted half of the money to fund a volunteer armed force to oust the Ottomans from Lebanon. He represented the Lebanon League of Progress in the post-World War I Paris Peace Conference of 1919 where he advocated for French tutelage over Mount Lebanon; he saw his endeavors materialize in the next few months with the creation of the State of Greater Lebanon. Mokarzel championed freedom of expression, religious tolerance, and women's right for education. He attacked the clergy for sanctioning female illiteracy, and child and forced marriages. He appointed the Lebanese-American journalist Afifa Karam as Director of Women's Issues and had a regular column published about the community's women issues.

Mokarzel died on 5 April 1932 in Paris; his body is interred in his hometown of Freike in Lebanon.

== Biography ==
=== Youth in Mount Lebanon ===
Mokarzel was born into a Maronite Catholic family from the town of Freike in Mount Lebanon, then a semi-autonomous province of the Ottoman Empire. His father Antoun, a Maronite priest, and his mother Barbara Mokarzel née Akl were influential figures in local civic and political affairs. Mokarzel attended school at the Collège de la Sagesse in Beirut and received higher education at the Jesuit Saint Joseph University in Beirut. After graduation, Mokarzel moved to Cairo, Egypt where he landed a job teaching literature at the Jesuit college; he became ill with fever after a year there and returned to his hometown in 1886 where he founded a boarding school. Mokarzel's return to Lebanon was brief and he soon decided to move to the United States. Mokarzel traveled with two relatives, Abdo Rihani and the latter's nephew, Ameen, who would become a major figure in the Mahjar literary movement.

=== In New York, early careers and turmoil ===
On August 4, 1888, Mokarzel and the Rihanis landed in New York; they lived in the basement of 59 Washington Street in Manhattan, a part of the city that was known as Little Syria due to the settlement of a growing Arab Christian immigrant population. The majority of the Syrian and Lebanese immigrants were of modest background and resorted to petty jobs, such as peddling. By contrast, Mokarzel hailed from the Beiruti elite. The Jesuit-educated Mokarzel, who was fluent in French, was quickly hired to teach the language at the Saint Francis Xavier's College in Manhattan, a Jesuit institution at the time. Besides teaching, he was also employed as a bookkeeper for different businesses before engaging in a dry goods commerce venture with Abdo Rihani in 1891. The business failed and Mokarzel consequently departed for Mount Lebanon in 1892.

Upon his return to the United States, the Arbeelys, a Greek Orthodox family of Damascene origins, had begun printing Kawkab America (American Star), the first Arabic-language newspaper in North America; Mokarzel set out to open his own newspaper Al-ʿAsr (The Epoch) with capital from his wealthy merchant friend, Najeeb Maalouf. Mokarzel and Nageeb Arbeely engaged in a journalistic feud, personally attacking each other resulting in series of lawsuits and counter-suits between the two newspapers. The enterprise floundered and was discontinued less than a year after its commencement. Mokarzel attended medical school for two years before dropping out. Meanwhile, Mokarzel was gaining notoriety for his controversial demeanor; he engaged in brawls and verbal disputes with other Arabic-speaking immigrants and was arrested on several occasions for libel and physical assault against members of the community affiliated with the Arbeely family. The brawls that started as a result of professional competition and personal antipathy evolved into sectarian battles between Mokarzel's Maronite entourage and the Orthodox families of the community. Despite his multiple arrests, Mokarzel was never jailed but the incidents were to continue. In 1895, Tannous Shishim, a Lebanese immigrant, petitioned for divorce from his wife Sophie on the ground of adultery and Mokarzel was named co-respondent in the court proceedings. The Arbeelys were quick to publish the culpable news in their newspaper along with a bilingual transcript of the judge's decision, further tarnishing the reputation of Mokarzel. The accused couple got married and eloped to Philadelphia to flee the community's public denunciation.

=== Inception of Al-Hoda ===
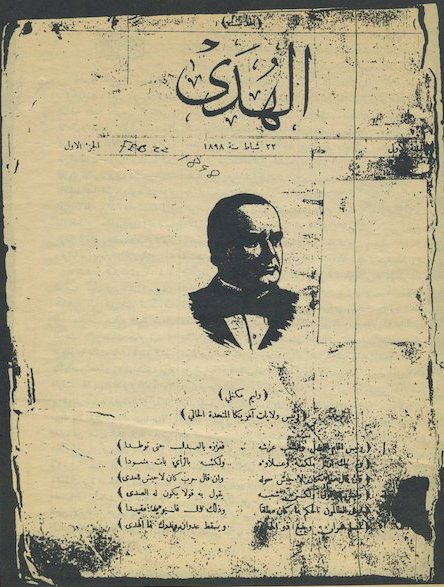
Copy of the cover page of the first issue of "Al-Hoda"

In Philadelphia on February 22, 1898, the estranged Mokarzel published the first issue of his second newspaper Al-Hoda (The Guidance), which became the longest-running Arabic newspaper in the United States. The first issue consisted of 18 pages of three columns each and appeared on a weekly basis. The publication expanded in November 1898 to 24 pages including six full pages of advertisement and was distributed in over forty countries. In early 1899, Mokarzel boasted that the circulation of Al-Hoda surpassed that of its main competitor, the Orthodox-inclined Kawkab America. Although claiming to be a non-sectarian publication, Al-Hoda was, like most of the New York-based Arabic newspapers, a mouthpiece to voice the confessional stances of the paper's owner. Al-Hoda was aimed primarily at the Arabic-speaking Levantine immigrants, especially the Maronite community; it reported on Ottoman politics in the Levant, political reform in Lebanon and on the environment of immigrant-run businesses. Mokarzel's brother Salloum traveled to the United States and joined the enterprise that same year. The format of the publication changed after Salloum's arrival; Al-Hoda began appearing twice weekly and was reduced to eight pages with more space reserved for paid advertisements. Despite his standing in the American Maronite community, infamy and controversy still followed Mokarzel. In 1899, the newlyweds published in Al-Hoda an apologetic article of Sophie's divorce from her previous husband and their subsequent marriage. However, Mokarzel's marriage was failing; he separated from Sophie on the same year that their defensive article was published and they divorced in 1902. Sophie returned to New York and took up selling linens before moving to South California where she started a linen shop and married her third husband, a Levantine confectioner. The Mokarzel brothers continued to print Al-Hoda in Philadelphia until late 1902.

=== Back in New York ===
In 1902, Naoum and his brother moved back to New York and settled in Brooklyn; they set up their newspaper's office on Manhattan's West Street. The first issue of Al-Hoda was published from the New York offices on 25 August 1902 and was since published on a daily basis. In 1904, Mokarzel married Ameen Rihani's sister Saada, who according to Naoum's niece and biographer Mary Mokarzel, was very eager to marry him. Ameen Rihani brokered his sister's marriage to Mokarzel but the two never cohabited and Saada soon returned to Mount Lebanon. In 1908, Mokarzel sued for divorce from Saada in absentia on the account that she had committing adultery in a hostel in Mount Lebanon. The divorce was settled in May and was followed by a ten-year dispute in which Saada tried to prove her innocence and to win alimony.

Mokarzel and Ameen Rihani had a lasting professional collaboration with Ameen publishing a regular section entitled Kashkoul al-Khawater (Patchwork of Thoughts) from 1901 until 1904. The two writers fell out because of Naoum's divorce from Saada and because of political differences and conflicting values.

=== Competing newspapers and sects ===
Mokarzel's approach to the Arab American community's other newspapers was contentious and confrontational, and he accused the editors of the other newspapers lacking integrity and professional ethics. The most frequent targets of Mokarzel's attacks were Kawkab America and Al-Islah (The Reform). Mokarzel posited ever since the establishment of Al-Hoda that his newspaper was secular and independent, accusing the other Arabic US-based newspapers of being sectarian and aligned to France, Britain, Russia and to the Ottomans. This position was staunchly upheld by Mokarzel until two Maronite clergymen Yusuf Yazbek and Estephan Qurqumaz sought to publish Al-Sakhra (The Rock), a newspaper representing American Maronites. Feeling threatened by the looming publication, Mokarzel contravened his previous positions and declared that Al-Hoda had always served the Maronite sect and nation and accused the clergymen of seeking "personal and dishonorable purposes". Yazbek accused Mokarzel's newspaper of being a mouthpiece of another Maronite priest, Khairallah Stefan. Mokarzel and his newspaper eventually prevailed.

The animosity prevailing between the newspapers representing different sects mirrored an intra-communal sectarian strife that turned violent in later years. In August 1905, Mokarzel reported that the Orthodox bishop Raphael Hawaweeny called upon his followers to "crush" him. The tensions developed into violence in the autumn of 1905 when the partisans of Hawaweeny and Mokarzel sympathizers clashed, resulting in 29 injured.

The sectarian tension in Little Syria reached its zenith in 1906 when John Stefan, brother of the priest Khairallah Stephan, was killed in a restaurant brawl on Washington Street. Mokarzel was apprehended by the police for the assault that was linked to the murder. Mokarzel's calumnious accusation and arrest were overturned as the complainant did not show up to the trial. The charge was dismissed and the police authorities settled on an Orthodox man, Elias Zreik, as the murderer. During Zreik's trial, the prosecution held that Elias and his brother George were sent to kill Mokarzel; when they did not find him in his office they set out to the restaurant where his Maronite sympathizers often met.

=== New Arabic printing era and political involvement ===
In 1910, the Mokarzel brothers decided to adapt the linotype machine to Arabic script to mitigate the expensive cost and tedious task of manual typesetting. Naoum Mokarzel imported Arabic type letters from Egypt and acquired the first such machine for Al-Hoda from the Mergenthaler company. While the linotype machine made printing cheaper, there was significant competition for readership since New York's Arabic-speaking community did not exceed 10,000 before World War II.

Through his writing in Al-Hoda and other American journals, Mokarzel was gaining further prominence as a leading figure of the American Maronite community and was seeking a similarly prominent woman to marry. In 1910 he married for the third and last time; his wife, Rose Abillama hailed from the princely Abillama family and was more than twenty years his minor. Mokarzel did not have any offspring from any of his marriages. In 1911, Mokarzel became the permanent president of the Lebanon League of Progress (Jamʿiyyat al-Nahda al-Lubnaniyya), a Maronite organization established in the US by the journalist Ibrahim Najjar (1882-1957) and dedicated to promoting a French-supported Maronite protectorate in Lebanon.

In June 1913, Mokarzel was the Lebanon League of Progress delegate to the First Arab Congress in Paris where he represented the North American Maronites. Delegates to the congress discussed reforms to grant the Arabs living under the Ottoman Empire autonomy. The congress did not have a lasting effect, due mostly to the beginning of World War I.

In 1917, Mokarzel sought and collected through Al-Hoda more than $30,000 US in donations to relieve his compatriots in Mount Lebanon who were experiencing a great famine due to Entente and Ottoman blockades. The collected donations were to be personally dispensed by Mokarzel, but half of the money was directed to fund a volunteer armed force that was gathering to enter Lebanon instead of toward relief aid. Mokarzel incorrectly surmised that the Entente powers would come to the Maronite force's assistance, but they did not take interest in the armed venture.

Mokarzel represented the Lebanon League of Progress in the Paris Peace Conference of 1919 where he advocated French tutelage over Mount Lebanon. On 28 September 1919, when the prospects of French control began to materialize, Mokarzel dispatched a fervent telegram to his New York office announcing that the French army would replace the British forces in Greater Syria and that Lebanon would come under French guardianship. In 1923, on the occasion of Al-Hoda's Silver Anniversary, Mokarzel was celebrated as a leading figure by the Maronite and the non-Maronite literary community of America, as well as by a number of American friends.

=== Last years and death ===
Mokarzel's last years were marked by bed-confining illnesses. He boarded a boat to France on March 18, 1932 despite his deteriorating health condition to attend a Lebanon-related conference in Paris. Mokarzel succumbed to his illnesses on April 5, 1932. His body was sent from Paris to New York where he received a large public funeral. His body was sent to Lebanon and interred in the family cemetery in his hometown of Freike. After his death, Al-Hoda came under Salloum's management, which passed at the latter's death in 1952 to his daughter Mary. The newspaper closed in 1971.

== Views and activism ==
Mokarzel held an esteemed position in New York's Arabic-speaking community at a young age; his political and social views were expressed in Al-Hoda as well as other non-Arabic American newspapers. According to Suleiman, Mokarzel was an obstinate and passionate individual who fiercely clung to and defended his opinions and the survival of his publication. He sought to convert detractors to his point of view and he repeatedly made contradictory statements and opinions. Mokarzel engaged in many disputes with his detractors and with editors or rival newspapers and responded to criticism with personal attacks and sarcasm.

=== Immigration ===
In 1896 the Ottoman government lifted the ban on the emigration of its subjects, prompting a surge of immigration to the United States from the Levant. The Ottomans saw benefit in the remittances sent by the Ottoman diaspora, which boosted the economy. In 1898, the Ford Committee lobbied for more stringent immigrant admission criteria to the United States and proposed to the US Congress that the undesirable be turned back. These measures aimed to dampen the flow of the non-European immigrants and prompted Mokarzel to call on all the community's newspapers to stop promoting immigration because the immigrants were likely to be turned back upon arrival. Despite the restrictive measures, only a small fraction of Levantine Ottoman immigrants were debarred.

=== Lebanese independence ===
The flag designed by Mokarzel and adopted for Mandatory Lebanon

Mokarzel harbored tacit Lebanese separationist aspirations that he did not openly advocate until the Ottoman defeat in World War I. Before the Ottomans' fall, Mokarzel's rhetoric was more diplomatic; unlike Al-Ayam (The Days), another US-based Arabic newspaper, which was openly hostile toward the Ottoman sultan and authorities, Al-Hoda took a more cautious tone, reminding its Arabic-speaking American readers that they were above all, Ottoman settlers in a foreign land. In 1894, Mokarzel attended an event honoring the Ottoman sultan, giving an address in French to the assembled notables among whom was the Ottoman consul-general of New York. In 1899, Mokarzel criticized the newly established Young Syria Party that aimed to overthrow the Ottoman government and sought to recruit a militia for that purpose. At the turn of the twentieth century, Mokarzel began to openly express his disdain for the Ottoman consul in New York. Mokarzel represented the Lebanon League of Progress in the Arab Congress of 1913 in Paris advocating for the autonomy of Mount Lebanon within the Ottoman Empire.

The mistreatment of the Lebanese during World War I and the ensuing famine were turning points for Mokarzel, who afterward openly called for Lebanon's independence from the Ottomans. In 1917, Mokarzel urged his readers to join a special battalion and fight alongside France to help force the Ottomans out of Lebanon. His call for action was met with distrust and was not successful as there was a growing concern that the recruits would be exploited in occupying Mount Lebanon on behalf of the French, not liberate it from the Turks. Mokarzel then engaged in a campaign among the Lebanese communities in the diaspora, especially in the Americas, to change the name of the community and its organizations from "Syrian" to "Lebanese". Mokarzel participated in the Paris Peace Conference of 1919 and advocated a French Mandate over Mount Lebanon to train the locals in good governance in preparation for independence. Mokarzel designed the flag used of Mandatory Lebanon; his calls for the establishment of a French-supported protectorate in Lebanon caused his detractors to accuse his newspaper of being financially supported by French endowments.

=== Religion and sectarianism ===
Despite being a staunch practicing Maronite, Mokarzel had often criticized and clashed with the Maronite clergy especially al-mursaloon missionaries who collected funds for the purpose of building or renovating churches in Lebanon. The Maronite clergy members were not accustomed to accountability or reproach of their actions, and thus Mokarzel's criticisms and accusations of corruption made them irate. He was subsequently accused by members of the clergy of being a Freemason. Instead of building more places of worship, Mokarzel pressed in a 1904 article for building more public and secular schools in which the clergy and religion had no influence, arguing that the priests were not serving their community. In a 1923 article, Mokarzel reasserted that secular schools were necessary to avoid sectarian antagonism and aversion between the people of the same nation. Mokarzel also criticized the clergy for imposing social and religious barriers on Syrian women which prevented them from receiving a formal education.

Mokarzel also called for freedom of expression and religious tolerance and used the Al-Hoda publishing house to propagate these values. In 1903, Al-Hoda published Ameen Rihani's The Tripartite Alliance in the Animal Kingdom, a book that was critical of religion. Both Rihani and Mokarzel were severely attacked by the Catholic clergy and by the editors of many rival Arabic newspapers in the United States. Notwithstanding his previous calls for secularism, Mokarzel engaged in a sectarian campaign aimed at Lebanon's Muslim population in November 1925; in a New York Times article, he called for French protection of Lebanese Christians from "the ruthless fanaticism of the Mohammedan element".

=== Women's rights and literacy ===
In a 1904 article entitled "You Are What Your Womenfolk Are", Mokarzel adamantly called against gender discrimination against women in education and attributed the Levantine women's lack of education to the backwardness of the clergy and their authority over women, which he argued, was the root cause of the lack of progress of the Arabic-speaking community of the United States. In an attack on the role of the clergy in barring women from education and from becoming teachers, Mokarzel described the women who submit to the clergy's impositions as traitors to God, and to the mothers' purpose of upbringing.

Mokarzel attacked what he called "false modesty" and how the men of the community allowed their women to peddle freely and stay out of town overnight while labeling them as immodest if they became writers or gave public lectures. Mokarzel found an ally in Afifa Karam, a stalwart woman writer whom he appointed as "Director of Women's Issues" in Al-Hoda. She contributed a regular column in the newspaper and continued writing about the community's women issues despite angry attacks and attempts to shame her. Mokarzel further encouraged female education by offering a free Al-Hoda subscription to any literate woman from the Arabic-speaking community of the United States. Mokarzel was, however, against granting women the right to vote and women's involvement in politics.

Mokarzel condemned forced marriages and child marriage that were still a tradition among Arabic-speaking communities of the US.

=== Great Druze Revolt ===
Mokarzel was a vehement opponent of the Great Syrian Revolt of 1925 which pitted Syrian and Lebanese rebels against the French Mandatory authorities. Mokarzel formed the "Committee to help the Lebanese victims and the refugees" and initiated a fundraising campaign supervised by the Lebanon League of Progress for the benefit of Lebanese victims of the uprising from Rashaya, Hasbaya and Marjayoun. He managed to collect more than half a million dollars that were transferred to a committee in Lebanon headed by Moussa Nammour, a member of the Lebanese parliament. Meraat-ul-Gharb (The Mirror of the Occident), a rival newspaper, accused Nammour of socializing with the French and accused Nammour's organization of corruption. Mokarzel was opposed to Emir Shakib Arslan, a leading figure of the Druze revolt, with whom he had fundamental political disagreements. He called on his readers to petition the US government to ask for the deportation of Arslan and of his delegation. Mokarzel managed to get the delegation under surveillance.

=== Arab whiteness and naturalization ===
In 1909 Mokarzel founded the Syrian American Association to defend the eligibility of Syrians to the American citizenship. Mokarzel and the SAA were engaged in the 1914 case Dow v. United States. The plaintiff, George Dow, was an Ottoman Syrian whose application for citizenship had been rejected twice by the lower courts of South Carolina. Mokarzel and Dow's lawyer mounted an elaborate defense of five points arguing why Dow was to be in the "white persons" category.

Mokarzel argued that Syrians are of Arab origins, "the purest type of the Semitic race" and that therefore are "free white persons" falling within the meaning of the naturalization statute. In the final ruling, the judge in Dow's case accepted the Dillingham report which stipulated that Syrians were from the Semitic branch of the Caucasian race, that they were of mixed Syrian, Arabian and Jewish ancestry and were not from the Mongolian race of their Turkish overlords. The judge finally ruled that Syrians were "white persons", and consequently the court granted Dow American citizenship. The Dow case officially settled the issue of race and eligibility for citizenship for the early Arab Americans.

== Legacy ==
By adapting the linotyope machine to the Arabic script, Mokarzel and Al-Hoda paved the way for cheaper and easier publishing for Arabic-speaking communities all throughout the world; subsequently, the New York Arabic-speaking colony became an intellectual epicenter through the preponderance of Arabic printing presses. Al-Hoda grew to be an Arabic daily with the widest circulation in North America. The New York Times wrote in 1948 that this development "made possible and immeasurably stimulated the growth of Arabic journalism in the Middle East".

== See also ==
- Al-Hoda
- Nageeb Arbeely
- 'Afifa Karam

== Bibliography ==
- Bailony, Reem (2013). "Transnationalism and the Syrian Migrant Community: The Case of the 1925 Syrian Revolt". Mashriq & Mahjar. 1 (1): 8–29. doi:10.24847/11i2013.3. ISSN 2169-4435. Archived from the original on 2019-12-15.
- Blum, Edward J. (2012). The color of Christ : the Son of God & the saga of race in America. Oliver Wendell Holmes Library Phillips Academy. Chapel Hill : University of North Carolina Press. ISBN 978-0-8078-3572-2.
- Dunlap, David W. (2010-08-25). "When an Arab Enclave Thrived Downtown". The New York Times. ISSN 0362-4331. Archived from the original on 2017-04-23.
- Fahrenthold, Stacy (2009). "Mother Syria and Syrian Motherhood: Imagining Mahjar Nationality Between Ideal and Real". Zaytoon. 1.
- Fahrenthold, Stacy D. (2014). "The Other Arab Revolt: On Mobilization from | Search Results | World War I in the Middle East and North Africa". World War I in the Middle East and North Africa. Georgetown University. Archived from the original on 2017-07-06.
- GhaneaBassiri, Kambiz (2010-04-19). A History of Islam in America: From the New World to the New World Order. Cambridge University Press. ISBN 978-1-139-78891-5.
- Gualtieri, Sarah (2004). "Strange fruit? Syrian immigrants, extralegal violence and racial formation in the Jim Crow south". Arab Studies Quarterly. 26 (3): 63–85. ISSN 0271-3519. JSTOR 41858491.
- Gualtieri, Sarah (2009). Between Arab and White: Race and Ethnicity in the Early Syrian American Diaspora. University of California Press. ISBN 978-0-520-94346-9.
- Hazam, John George (1932). Arab Nationalism and Anglo-French Imperialism on the Eve of the World War. University of California, Berkeley.
- Hazran, Yusri (2013-08-01). "The Zajal: Popular Poetry and the Struggle over Lebanon's History". Middle Eastern Literatures. 16 (2): 169–188. doi:10.1080/1475262X.2013.843260. ISSN 1475-262X. S2CID 161474728.
- Hourani, Albert H.; Shehadi, Nadim (1992). The Lebanese and the World: A Century of Emigration. I. B. Tauris. ISBN 978-1-85043-303-3.
- Jackson, Simon (2013). "Diaspora politics and developmental empire : the Syro-Lebanese at the League of Nations". Arab Studies Journal. 21 (1): 166–190. ISSN 1083-4753. JSTOR 41968272.
- Jacobs, Linda K. (2015a). Strangers in the West: The Syrian Colony of New York City, 1880-1900 (Kindle ebook). New York: Kalimah Press. ISBN 978-0-9835392-5-4.
- Jacobs, Linda K. (2015b). "Naoum Mokarzel". Kalimah Press.
- Kayyali, Randa A. (2006). The Arab Americans. Westport, Conn.: Greenwood Publishing Group. ISBN 978-0-313-33219-7.
- Khalidi, Rashid (1980). British Policy Towards Syria & Palestine, 1906-1914: A Study of the Antecedents of the Hussein-the [sic] McMahon Correspondence, the Sykes-Picot Agreement, and the Balfour Declaration. London: Middle East Centre, St. Antony's College, Oxford Ithaca Press. ISBN 978-0-903729-57-4.
- Mokarzel, Mary (1968). Al-Hoda, 1898-1968: The Story of Lebanon and Its Emigrants Taken from the Newspaper Al-Hoda. New York: al-Hoda press.
- Mokarzel, Naoum (1904a). "The School and the Church". Al-Hoda.
- Mokarzel, Naoum (1904b). "The Syrian-American marriage". Al-Hoda.
- Mokarzel, Naoum (1905). "It is a Syrian crime". Al-Hoda.
- Mokarzel (1923). "Which is better to have, churches or schools?". Al-Akhlaq.
- Mokarzel, Naoum (1932). Mokarzel, Salloum (ed.). مختارات الخواطر [An anthology of thoughts] (PDF) (in Arabic). New York: al-Hoda press. pp. أ–ع. Archived from the original (PDF) on 2020-12-04.
- "جان داية يكشف عن خمسين مقالة مجهولة لأمين الريحاني في "كشكول الخواطر" – الاسبوع العربي احداث لبنانية عربية سياسية اقتصادية اجتماعية" [Jean Dayeh reveals fifty anonymous articles by Amin al-Rayhani in " Kashkul al-Khawater»] (in Arabic). الاسبوع العربي. Reuters. 2014. Archived from the original on 2021-03-19.
- Suleiman, Michael W. (1999). "The Mokarzels' contributions to the Arabic-speaking community in the United States". Arab Studies Quarterly. 21 (2): 71–88. ISSN 0271-3519. JSTOR 41858285.
- Moses, John G.; Nassar, Paul E.; Rosenblatt, Judith (1994). Annotated Index to the Syrian World, 1926-1932. Saint Paul, Minnesota: Immigration History Research Center, University of Minnesota. hdl:11299/175685. ISBN 0932833136.
