= Mary Ajami =

Syrian feminist writer (1888–1965)

- ماري عجمي
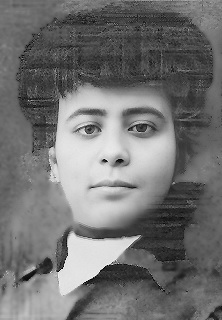
- Ajami in 1910
- Born: 1888; Damascus, Ottoman Syria
- Died: 25 December 1965 (aged 76–77); Damascus, Syria
- Occupations: Journalist, poet
- Movement: Nahda

Mary Ajami (Arabic: ماري عجمي / ALA-LC: Mārī ʻAbduh ʻAjamī; 1888 – 25 December 1965) was a Syrian journalist, poet and social rights activist who launched the first women's periodical in West Asia, titled Al-'Arus (Arabic: العروس, lit. 'The Bride').

A writer devoted to social reform, Ajami was one of pioneers of the Nahda cultural renaissance. She was an Arab nationalist who wrote extensively against Turkish and French colonial rule, arguing for an independent Syrian state with equal rights. She also formed her own literary club in Damascus bringing women and men together to discuss as equals, unique for its time in Syria.

== Early life ==
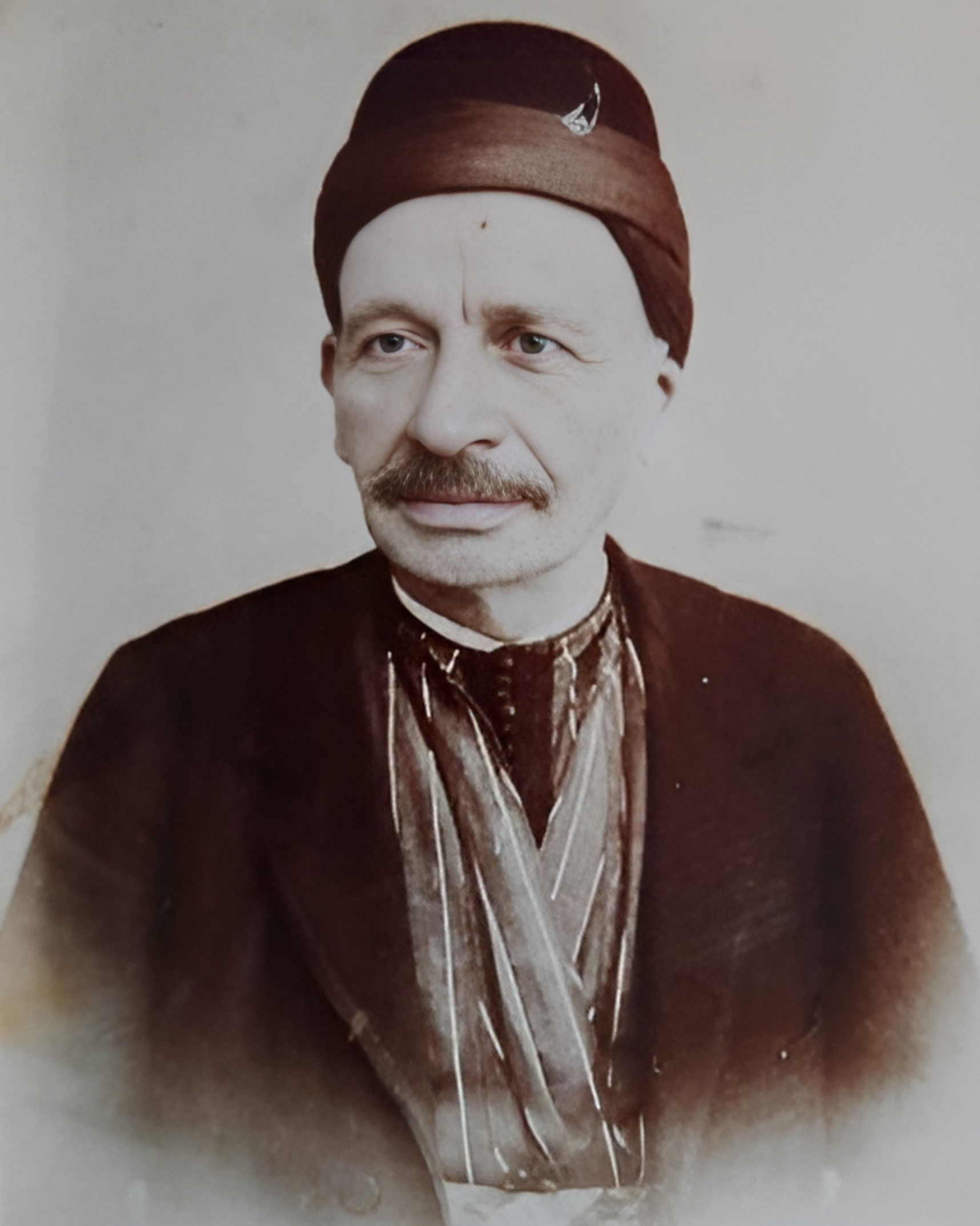
Mary's father, Abdallah al-Ajami

Ajami was born to a large Greek Orthodox family in Damascus, Syria. Ajami spent her formative years in Damascus, where she received an education from Irish and Russian missionary schools, before studying nursing and graduating from the Syrian Protestant College in Beirut in 1906. While she was a student, she began teaching as a visiting teacher in Zahlé, Lebanon. After graduation, she began teaching in Port Said, Egypt. In 1909, Ajami moved to Alexandria and worked as a school principal at the Madrasat al-Banat al-Aqbat (Young Coptic Girls school), before returning to her native Damascus to teach English to students attending the Russian military school.

== Journalism ==
Ajami was a writer, frequently publishing her work under the pseudonym of Layla (her mother's name) for fear of reprisals. Between 1906 and 1910 she worked as a correspondent for newspapers in Syria and Lebanon, including Muhammad Kurd Ali's weekly newspaper al-Muqtabi (Damascus), al-Mathhab (Zahle), al-Akhaa (Hama), al-Hasnaa’ and Lisan al-Hal (Beirut). During World War I, Ajami wrote editorials for the Egyptian newspaper Al-Ahrar (Free Patriots), and for Al-Islah (Reform), an Arabic newspaper based in Buenos Aires, Argentina.

Ajami wrote in a realist tone when discussing politics and ideology, contrasted with a more romantic style when describing nature and her fondness for it.

== The Bride ==
In 1910, Ajami began her own periodical, Al-'Arus (The Bride), which was the first Syrian publication to defend women's rights, and ran for 11 years. As the editor-in-chief, she was able to employ a few educated women to serve on its editorial board, although she had the young women sign their journalist contributions under pseudonyms for anonymity in Syria's male-dominated society. She personally raised the necessary funds to support the journal, which soon became recognized as "one of the highest quality periodicals in the Arab world." While the journal was a success among the country's female educated elite, it was scorned by conservative readers who condemned its messages and sought to abolish it. Notable contributors of Al-'Arus included Kahlil Gibran, Mikhail Naimy, Ahmed Shawqi, Rose Shahfa, Zaynab Fawwaz, Elia Abu Madi, Maruf Al Rusafi, Nazik al-Abid and Abbas Mahmoud Al Aqqad.

Addressing the male component of Syrian society, Ajami opened her periodical:

To those who see in woman's spirit a strength that destroys all seeds of corruption,

In her hands a weapon that crushes oppression, on her tongue words that soothe the deepest despair,

To those extending their hands to save women from misogynistic delusion, I publish this magazine.

— Al-Arous, vol. 1 December 10, p.1

The publication covered a variety of topics segmented by sections, including fine arts, fiction and daily life, but its focus on psychological studies and social reform became the defining aspect of the magazine. She also raised awareness around womanhood, urging mothers to educate their daughters about biological changes during puberty. Simultaneously, she addressed fathers, encouraging them to support their sons through the same transitional stages.

Al-'Arus was circulated in Lebanon, Syria, Iraq, Palestine, Egypt and Jordan. During World War I (from 1914 to 1918), the journal suspended publication, but it resumed in 1919 changing to three publication places: Alexandria, Beirut, and Damascus. In 1920, religious leaders demanded that Ajami be brought to trial for promoting heresy by publishing a story supporting civil marriage. The publication ceased in 1925.

== Literary saloon ==
In 1920, after the Ottoman Empire collapsed, Ajami founded the Damascus Women's Literary Club. The literary salon was well attended by both men and women, who took the opportunity to discuss politics, philosophy and religious affairs. Her salon was groundbreaking at the time, because allowing men and women to engage in discussions together was unheard of in Syria. She described the salon's aim as "reviving female intelligentsia."

Some say women are born to serve their husbands, others say women are born to serve their fathers, I say her rights exist for herself.

— Al-Arous, vol. 6 August 20, p.6

According to Joseph T. Zeidan, the melodic tones of Mary's sister's piano playing was enjoyed by visitors to the salon, as well as the insightful comments of Mary herself, who was "highly praised for her ability to run the intellectual discourse and was acknowledged as a 'skilled talker'".

== Syrian nationalism ==
Ajami is linked to the nationalists who fought against Turkish and later French rule; she personally visited imprisoned leaders and advocated on their behalf. Ajami was resolutely opposed to the Ottoman Empire, especially after 1915, when authorities in Beirut executed her fiancé, Petro Pauli, for criticizing the occupying military regime of Sultan Mohammed Rashad V. From 1918 to 1920 she headed the Christian Women's Club, an organization aimed at promoting Arabism amongst the Christians of Damascus and Beirut, being vocal against the adoption of European attitudes, products and language at the expense of Arab language, culture and produce. After the French victory and subsequent occupation of Syria in 1920, Ajami continued resisting against the colonial [French] mandate just as she resisted against the Ottomans. She faced attacks by the French colonial Government in Damascus and Beirut who had full control over the media in Syria and Lebanon until 1952.

=== Common cause ===
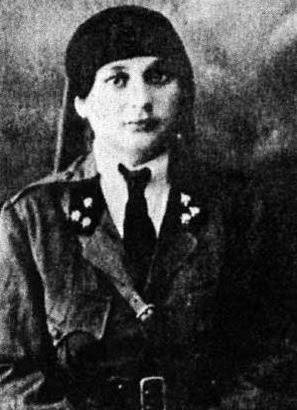
Nazik Al-Abid in military garb before the Battle of Maysalun, 1920

Nazik al-Abid, a women's rights activist, nationalist, and critic of Ottoman and French colonialism, known as the "Joan of Arc of the Arabs", shared a unique friendship with Ajami. In Damascus living at the precipice of societal change, they quickly became popular public figures due to their relentless advocacy for women's rights in society and the wider demand for an independent Syrian state during the Ottoman Empire (and later France), using their own newspapers al-Arus and Nur al-Fayha to reach out and mobilize people in public and private spaces. Ajami and al-Abid were thus instrumental in allowing women in Syria to vote, going directly to King Faisal I, the first post-Ottoman ruler of Syria. They later established the "Martyrs Daughters School" together in 1920 to support the orphans of martyrs following the Battle of Maysalun and the French victory.

== Later years ==
In 1940, she taught in Iraq, with a notable student being the poet Nazik Al-Malaika. In 1947, her poem "The Peasant's Hope" won first prize on BBC radio in London.

Ajami's successful career was tempered by elements of tragedy in her personal life. For many years, she longed to continue her studies abroad, but her father's death and the outbreak of war prevented her from doing so. Ajami was somewhat of an anomaly for her time, and, like her peer May Ziadeh, Ajami never married. She died on 25 December 1965, and was buried in the St. George Greek Orthodox Church in Damascus’ Bab Sharqi neighborhood.

=== Tributes ===
Fares al-Khoury, the two-time prime minister of Syria, was a frequent visitor to Ajami's literary salon and compared her to Ziadeh when he said in verse form,

My friends take it from me,

I can say that Mary Ajami

can match with May Ziadeh

For skill and ingenuity.

Joseph T. Zeidan notes that Ajami "must be assessed in the light of formidable obstacles she encountered while struggling to keep her journal alive, not least of which were her father's attempts to persuade her to quit."

== Selected publications ==
- Al-Majdaliyya al-Hasna' (the Beautiful Magdelene) (1913)
- Mukhtarat min al-Sh'r (Selected Poems) (1944)

== See also ==
- Women's literary salons and societies in the Arab world
- The Arab Human Development Report: Towards the Rise of Women in the Arab World
