= Al-'Arus =

Women's magazine in Syria (1910–1925

- Editor: Mary Ajami
- Categories: Women's magazine
- Frequency: Monthly
- Founder: Mary Ajami
- Founded: 1910
- First issue: December 1910
- Final issue: 1925
- Country: Egypt; Syria
- Based in: Alexandria; Damascus
- Language: Arabic

Al-'Arus (Arabic: العروس / ALA-LC: Al-ʻArūs, lit. 'The Bride') was a women's magazine which was one of the earliest feminist publications in the Middle East. It was also the first Arabic women's magazine in Syria. The magazine appeared between 1910 and 1925 with some interruptions. The founder and editor of the magazine was a Syrian woman, Mary Ajami. It was first based in Alexandria, Egypt, and then in Damascus, Syria.

== History and profile ==
Al-'Arus was established by Mary Ajami, a Syrian Orthodox, in Alexandria in 1910 as a 32-page women's magazine. Its first issue appeared in December that year. Ajami also edited the magazine which featured articles on history, literature, culture and medicine focusing on the problems of women. Shortly after its start, the magazine moved to Damascus, the hometown of Ajami. It was expanded, becoming a 40-page monthly magazine which temporarily ceased publication in 1914 when World War I began.

The magazine resumed publication in Damascus after the war ended in 1918 and had 60 pages. Al-'Arus folded in 1925 due to the Great Syrian Revolt.

== Contributors ==
Notable contributors of Al-'Arus included Kahlil Gibran, Mikhail Naimy, Elia Abu Madi, Maruf Al Rusafi and Abbas Mahmoud Al Aqqad.
