= List of works by Kahlil Gibran =

This is a list of works by Kahlil Gibran, including writings and the visual arts.

== Writings ==
Title	Publisher	Location	Date	Language	Translated title
نبذة في فن الموسيقى	المهاجر	New York	1905	Arabic	A Profile of the Art of Music
عرائس المروج	المهاجر	New York	1906	Arabic	Nymphs of the Valley
الأرواح المتمردة	المهاجر	New York	1908	Arabic	Spirits Rebellious
الأجنحة المتكسرة	مرآة الغرب	New York	1912	Arabic	Broken Wings
دمعة وابتسامة	Atlantic	New York	1914	Arabic	A Tear and a Smile
The Madman	Alfred A. Knopf	New York	1918	English	—
المواكب	مرآة الغرب	New York	1919	Arabic	The Processions
Twenty Drawings	Alfred A. Knopf	New York	1919	English	—
العواصف	الهلال	Cairo	1920	Arabic	The Tempests
The Forerunner	Alfred A. Knopf	New York	1920	English	—
البدائع والطرائف	المطبعة العصرية	Cairo	1923	Arabic	The New and the Marvelous
The Prophet	Alfred A. Knopf	New York	1923	English	—
Sand and Foam	Alfred A. Knopf	New York	1926	English	—
Jesus, the Son of Man	Alfred A. Knopf	New York	1928	English	—
The Earth Gods	Alfred A. Knopf	New York	1931	English	—
The Wanderer	Alfred A. Knopf	New York	1932 (posthumous)	English	—
The Garden of the Prophet (revised by Mary Haskell then Barbara Young)	Alfred A. Knopf	New York	1933 (posthumous)	English	—
Lazarus and his Beloved (play)	New York Graphic Society	Greenwich	1973 (posthumous)	English	—
The Blind (play)	The Westminster Press	Philadelphia	1981 (posthumous)	English	—
الرجل غير المنظور (play)	دار أمواج	Beirut	1993 (posthumous)	Arabic	The Man Unseen
بين الليل والصباح (play)	دار أمواج	Beirut	1993 (posthumous)	Arabic	Between Night and Morning
الوجوه الملونة (play)	دار أمواج	Beirut	1993 (posthumous)	Arabic	The Colored Faces
بدء الثورة (play)	دار أمواج	Beirut	1993 (posthumous)	Arabic	The Beginning of the Revolution
ملك البلاد وراعي الغنم (play)	دار أمواج	Beirut	1993 (posthumous)	Arabic	The King and the Shepherd
The Banshee (unfinished play)	—	—	—	English	—
The Last Unction (unfinished play)	—	—	—	English	—
The Hunchback or the Man Unseen (unfinished play)	—	—	—	English	—
To Albert Pinkham Ryder (printed privately in 1915 at Cosmus & Washburn)	—	—	—	English	—

Writings published in periodicals:

Title	Periodical	Location	Date	Language	Translated title
أيها الليل	Al-Funoon	New York	April 1913	Arabic	O Night
على باب الهيكل	Al-Funoon	New York	June 1913	Arabic	At the Temple's Gate
يا زمان الحب	Al-Funoon	New York	June 1913	Arabic	O Time of Love
قبل الانتحار	Al-Funoon	New York	August 1913	Arabic	Before committing suicide
أبو العلاء المعري	Al-Funoon	New York	September 1913	Arabic	Abu al-Ala' al-Ma'arri
الشاعر	Al-Funoon	New York	November 1913	Arabic	The Poet
إلى المسلمين من شاعر مسيحي	Al-Funoon	New York	November 1913	Arabic	To Muslims from a Christian Poet
أنت وأنا	Al-Funoon	New York	December 1913	Arabic	You and I
رؤيا	Al-Funoon	New York	June 1916	Arabic	Vision
يا نفس	Al-Funoon	New York	June 1916	Arabic	O Soul
الليل والمجنون	Al-Funoon	New York	July 1916	Arabic	Night and the Madman
الفارض	Al-Funoon	New York	July 1916	Arabic	Al-Farid
بالله يا قلبي	Al-Funoon	New York	August 1916	Arabic	By God, O my Heart
ما وراء الرداء	Al-Funoon	New York	September 1916	Arabic	Beyond the Robe
مات أهلي	Al-Funoon	New York	October 1916	Arabic	Dead Are My People
السم في الدسم	Al-Funoon	New York	November 1916	Arabic	Poison in the Fat
Night and the Madman	The Seven Arts	New York	November 1916	English	—
بالأمس	Al-Funoon	New York	December 1916	Arabic	Yesterday
The Greater Sea	The Seven Arts	New York	December 1916	English	—
الفلكي	Al-Funoon	New York	January 1917	Arabic	The Astronomer
The Astronomer	The Seven Arts	New York	January 1917	English	—
On Giving and Taking	The Seven Arts	New York	January 1917	English	—
النملات الثلاث	Al-Funoon	New York	February 1917	Arabic	The Three Ants
الكلب الحكيم	Al-Funoon	New York	February 1917	Arabic	The Wise Dog
The Seven Selves	The Seven Arts	New York	February 1917	English	—
أغنية الليل	Al-Funoon	New York	March 1917	Arabic	Song of the Night
البحر الأعظم	Al-Funoon	New York	March 1917	Arabic	The Great Sea
الله	Al-Funoon	New York	April 1917	Arabic	God
يا صاحبي	Al-Funoon	New York	May 1917	Arabic	My Friend
Poems from the Arabic	The Seven Arts	New York	May 1917	English	—
البنفسجة الطموحة	Al-Funoon	New York	August 1917	Arabic	The Ambitious Violet
الغزالي	Al-Funoon	New York	September 1917	Arabic	Al-Ghazali
العاصفة	Al-Funoon	New York	September 1917	Arabic	The Tempest
بلأمس واليوم وغدا	Al-Funoon	New York	October 1917	Arabic	Yesterday, Today and Tomorrow
موشحات جديدة : البحر ؛ الشرورة ؛ الجبار الرئبال ؛ الشهرة	Al-Funoon	New York	October 1917	Arabic	New verses: The Sea; Blackbird; The Colossus; Fame
ابن سينا وقصيدته	Al-Funoon	New York	October 1917	Arabic	Avicenna and his Poem
الأرض	Al-Funoon	New York	October 1917	Arabic	The Earth
الحكيمان	Al-Funoon	New York	November 1917	Arabic	The Wise Man
بين الفصل والفصل	Al-Funoon	New York	November 1917	Arabic	Between chapter and chapter
[Untitled]	Al-Funoon	New York	June 1918	Arabic	—
الأمم وذواتها	Al-Funoon	New York	August 1918	Arabic	The World and Itself
[Untitled]	Al-Funoon	New York	August 1918	Arabic	—
War and the Small Nations	The Borzoi	New York	1920	English	—
Seven Sayings	The Dial	New York	January 1921	English	—
Lullaby	The New Orient	New York	July 1925	English	—
The Blind Poet	The New Orient	New York	July 1926	English	—
To Young Americans of Syrian Origin	The Syrian World	New York	July 1926	English	—
Youth and Age	The Syrian World	New York	December 1926	English	—
(Syrian Folk Songs:) O Mother Mine (Moulaya) (translation)	The Syrian World	New York	March 1927	English	—
(Syrian Folk Songs:) I wandered among the Mountains (translation)	The Syrian World	New York	May 1927	English	—
(Syrian Folk Songs:) Three Maiden Lovers (translation)	The Syrian World	New York	September 1927	English	—
The Two Hermits	The Syrian World	New York	October 1927	English	—
When My Sorrow Was Born	The Syrian World	New York	December 1927	English	—
War	The Syrian World	New York	January 1928	English	—
Said a Blade of Grass	The Syrian World	New York	March 1928	English	—
Critics	The Syrian World	New York	April 1928	English	—
War and the Small Nations	The Syrian World	New York	May 1928	English	—
Love	The Syrian World	New York	June 1928	English	—
The King of Aradus	The Syrian World	New York	September 1928	English	—
The Plutocrat	The Syrian World	New York	October 1928	English	—
A Man from Lebanon Nineteen Centuries Afterward	The Syrian World	New York	November 1928	English	—
The Great Recurrence	New York Herald Tribune Magazine	New York	December 23, 1928	English	—
Night	The Syrian World	New York	December 1928	English	—
Defeat	The Syrian World	New York	January 1929	English	—
The Great Longing	The Syrian World	New York	February 1929	English	—
The Saint	The Syrian World	New York	March 1929	English	—
Fame	The Syrian World	New York	April 1929	English	—
Out of My Deeper Heart	The Syrian World	New York	May 1929	English	—
Snow	New York Herald Tribune Magazine	New York	December 22, 1929	English	—
The Two Learned Men	The Syrian World	New York	January 1930	English	—
On Giving and Taking	The Syrian World	New York	March 1930	English	—
Helpfulness	The Syrian World	New York	April 1930	English	—
On the Art of Writing	The Syrian World	New York	May 1930	English	—
On Hatred	The Syrian World	New York	June 1930	English	—
Greatness	The Syrian World	New York	September 1930	English	—
The Tragic Love of a Caliph	The Syrian World	New York	October 1930	English	—
On Giving and Taking	The Syrian World	New York	October 1930	English	—
Song	The Syrian World	New York	December 1930	English	—
A Marvel and a Riddle	The Syrian World	New York	January 1931	English	—
Past and Future	The Syrian World	New York	February 1931	English	—
Speech and Silence	The Syrian World	New York	March 1931	English	—

=== Correspondence ===
- A Self-Portrait (edited and translated by Anthony R. Ferris, 1959, New York)
- Beloved Prophet, The love letters of Khalil Gibran and Mary Haskell, and her private journal (edited by Virginia Hilu, 1972, New York)
- Blue Flame: The Love Letters of Kahlil Gibran to May Ziadah (edited and translated by Suheil Bushrui and Salma Kuzbari, 1983, London)

=== Other collections ===
- Prose Poems (1934)
- Secrets of the Heart (1947)
- A Treasury of Kahlil Gibran (1951)
- Thoughts and Meditations (1960)
- A Second Treasury of Kahlil Gibran (1962)
- Spiritual Sayings (1962)
- Voice of the Master (1963)
- Mirrors of the Soul (1965)
- Between Night & Morn (1972)
- A Third Treasury of Kahlil Gibran (1975)
- The Wisdom of Kahlil Gibran: The Prophet, the Soul, and the Song of Love (1993)
- The Storm (1994)
- The Beloved (1994)
- The Vision (1994)
- The Eye of the Prophet (1995)
- The Treasured Writings of Kahlil Gibran (1995)

== Visual art ==
Picture	Title	Year	Collection
	Untitled	c. 1900–1931	Museo Soumaya
	Untitled	1903	Telfair Museums
	Comforting Angel	c. 1904	
	The Vision of Adam and Eve	c. 1904	Telfair Museums
	Medusa	c. 1905–1908	Telfair Museums
	Untitled	1905	Telfair Museums
	Untitled	1905	Telfair Museums
	Untitled (Self-Portrait)	1905	
	Untitled	1907	Telfair Museums
	Charlotte Teller	1908	Telfair Museums
	Charlotte Teller	1908	Telfair Museums
	Charlotte Teller	1908	Telfair Museums
	Evocation of Sultana Tabet (?)	1908	
	Head of Emily Michel	1908	Telfair Museums
	Head of Micheline and Line Drawing of Sultana's Head	1908	Telfair Museums
	The Head of Orpheus Floating Down the River Hebrus to the Sea	c. 1908–1914	Telfair Museums
	Head of Sultana Tabit	1908	Telfair Museums
	Portrait of Amin Rihani	c. 1908–1912	Barjeel Art Foundation
	Portrait of the Artist's Mother	c. 1908–1914	Telfair Museums
	Portrait of Charlotte Teller	c. 1908–1910	
	Portrait of Yamile	c. 1908–1910	
	Untitled	1908	Telfair Museums
	Untitled	1908	Telfair Museums
	Untitled	1908	Telfair Museums
	Untitled	1908	Telfair Museums
	Untitled (Marianna Gibran)	c. 1908–1914	Telfair Museums
	Portrait of Emilie Michel (Micheline)	1909	Museo Soumaya
	Ages of Women	1910	Museo Soumaya
	Ameen Rihani	c. 1910–1915	Telfair Museums
	Francis Mar[r]ash	c. 1910	
	Mary Haskell	1910	Telfair Museums
	Micheline	c. 1910–1912	Telfair Museums
	Portrait of Charles William Eliot	1910	
	Portrait of Mary Haskell	1910	Telfair Museums
	Self-Sketch	1910	Telfair Museums
	Untitled	1910	Telfair Museums
	Untitled	1910	Telfair Museums
	Untitled	1910	Telfair Museums
	Untitled	1910	Telfair Museums
	Untitled	1910	Telfair Museums
	Untitled	c. 1910–1913	Telfair Museums
	Untitled	c. 1910–1914	Telfair Museums
	Untitled	c. 1910–1915	Telfair Museums
	Portrait of Charlotte Teller	c. 1911	
	Self Portrait	c. 1911	
	Self Portrait and Muse	1911	Museo Soumaya
	Untitled	1911	Telfair Museums
	Untitled	1911	Telfair Museums
	Untitled	c. 1911–1915	Telfair Museums
	Untitled (Rose Sleeves)	1911	Telfair Museums
	Unfinished Portrait of a Lady	c. 1912	
	Untitled	1912	Telfair Museums
	Untitled	1912	Telfair Museums
	Untitled	1912	Telfair Museums
	Untitled	c. 1912–1915	Telfair Museums
	Untitled	c. 1912–1916	Telfair Museums
	Untitled	c. 1912–1918	Telfair Museums
	The Gift	c. 1913–1917	Telfair Museums
	Spirit of the Centaurs	1913	Museo Soumaya
	Untitled	1913–1917	Telfair Museums
	Portrait of Mrs. Alexander Morten	1914	
	Albert Pinkham Ryder	1915	Metropolitan Museum of Art
	The Blind	1915	
	Portrait of the American painter Albert Ryder	1915	
	Untitled	c. 1915–1918	Telfair Museums
	Untitled	c. 1915–1918	Telfair Museums
	Uplifted Figure	1915	Telfair Museums
	The Great Longing	1916	Telfair Museums
	John Masefield	1916	Metropolitan Museum of Art
	Towards the Infinite	1916	Metropolitan Museum of Art
	Design for Converse Honor	1917	Telfair Museums
	The Greater Self	1917	Telfair Museums
	Study of a Face	1917	Telfair Museums
	Untitled	1917	Telfair Museums
	Untitled	c. 1917–1920	Telfair Museums
	The Three are One	1918	Telfair Museums
	The Triangle	1918	
	Hands, Female, Nude, Baby	1919	Brooklyn Museum
	And The Lamb Prayed In His Heart	1920	Harvard Art Museums
	The Dying Man and the Vulture	1920	Telfair Museums
	Head of Christ	1920	Telfair Museums
	The Heavenly Mother	1920	Telfair Museums
	Man in search of existence	c. 1920	
	Johan Bojer	1920	Metropolitan Museum of Art
	Mother and Child	1920	Telfair Museums
	The Slave	1920	Harvard Art Museums
	Untitled	1920	Telfair Museums
	Spirit of Light or Spiritual Communion	1921	Telfair Museums
	Untitled	1921	Telfair Museums
	Profile of Mary Haskell	1922	Telfair Museums
	Dr. John F. Erdmann	1923	Metropolitan Museum of Art
	Face of Almustafa	1923	
	The Triad-Being descending towards the Mother-Sea	1923	
	Mrs. Whitney	1924	Metropolitan Museum of Art
	The Summit	c. 1925	Telfair Museums
	Untitled	c. 1925	Telfair Museums
	The Blessed Mountain	c. 1926	Telfair Museums
	Mrs. Erdmann, Mrs. Whitney and Mrs. Kusar	1926	Metropolitan Museum of Art
	Jesus, Son of Man	c. 1928	Telfair Museums
	Human figures spread out below a dark landscape	1930	
	The Outstretched Hand	1930	Telfair Museums
	Untitled	1930	Telfair Museums
	Untitled	1930	Telfair Museums
	Untitled	1930	Telfair Museums
	Crossed Open Embrace	c. 1931	Telfair Museums
	Life	c. 1931	Telfair Museums
	Head of Micheline	undated	Telfair Museums
	I Have Come Down the Ages		Metropolitan Museum of Art
	Three standing figures	undated	Barjeel Art Foundation
	Standing figure and child	undated	Barjeel Art Foundation
	Mother Earth	undated	Telfair Museums
	Untitled	undated	Telfair Museums
	Untitled	undated	Telfair Museums
	Untitled	undated	Telfair Museums
	Untitled	undated	Telfair Museums
	Untitled	undated	Telfair Museums
	Untitled	undated	Telfair Museums
	Untitled	undated	Telfair Museums
	Untitled	undated	Telfair Museums
	Untitled	undated	Telfair Museums
	Untitled	undated	Telfair Museums
	Untitled	undated	Telfair Museums

== Sources ==
- Daoudi, M.S. (1982). The Meaning of Kahlil Gibran. Citadel Press.
- Hawi, Khalil S. (1982). Kahlil Gibran: his Background, Character, and Works. Third World Centre for Research and Publishing. ISBN 978-0-86199-011-5.
- Popp, Richard A. (2000). Al-Funun: the Making of an Arab-American Literary Journal.
