= Muhammad Jamil =

Muhammad Jamil may refer to:

- Muhammad Jamil Al-Mayahi
- Muhammad Jamil Bayham, Lebanese author and politician
- Muhammad Jamil Jambek, Indonesian Islamic scholar
- Muhammad Jamil Malik, Pakistani politician
