= Labiba Sawaya =

Lebanese novelist and poet (1876 – 1916)

- لبيبة صوايا
- Born: 1876; Tripoli
- Died: 1916 (aged 39–40); Homs
- Occupation: Poet, novelist

Labiba Mikha'il Sawaya (1876 – 1916) was a Lebanese novelist and poet.

Labiba Sawaya was born in 1876 in Tripoli, Lebanon. In 1892, she graduated from the Higher American School for Girls, a missionary school, and was a teacher there. She also worked in Syria as a teacher and principal of a school in Homs. She wrote for the publications al-Mabahith al-Tarabulusiya, al-Mawrid al-safi, and Lisan al-ittihad.

Her Hasna' Salunik (The Beauty of Salonika, 1909) was one of the earliest Arabic language novels. Set before and during the Young Turk Revolution, the family of the heroine Wasimah flees from Istanbul to Salonika, Greece. Wasimah continues her studies in Europe while her beloved Zaki joins the struggle against the despotism of Abdul Hamid II. Zaki is killed so Wasimah becomes a nurse for the revolutionaries, but her grief becomes too much and she commits suicide. The novel is overtly political, and even includes the list of demands issued by the Committee of Union and Progress. The novel was serialized in the American Arabic language newspaper Al-Hoda.

Labiba Sawaya died in 1916 in Homs.

== Bibliography ==
- Hasna' Salunik (The Beauty of Salonika, novel). Damascus: Orthodox Patriarch Press, 1909.
