= Al-Hoda =

Newspaper in New York City, New York

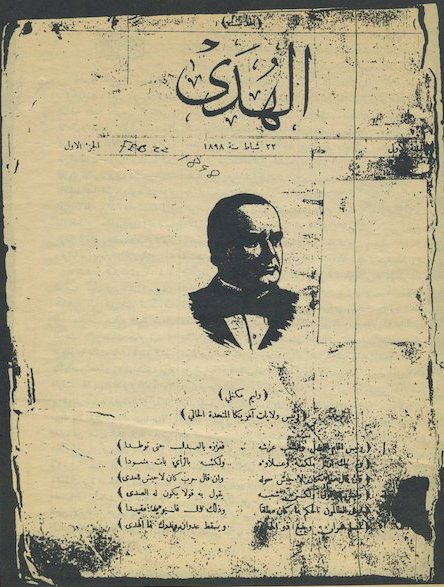
Copy of the cover page of the first issue of "Al-Hoda"

Al-Hoda (Arabic: الهدى, romanized: al-hudā, lit. 'The Guidance') was a daily Arabic-language newspaper in New York City. It was founded in Philadelphia as a bi-weekly by Naoum Anthony Mokarzel, a young Maronite Lebanese man with an interest in journalism. Its first issue came out on February 22, 1898. The paper's offices moved to New York City in 1902, where it became a daily, beginning on August 25.

This was one of the first Arabic language newspapers in the United States. It was the first Arabic language newspaper to use Arabic character linotype rather than hand-setting. Mokarzel remained the paper's owner and chief editor until his death in 1932. The editorship was then assumed by Naoum's brother Salloum, who held it until 1952. Salloum Mokarzel also founded The Syrian World—a journal that published articles on the history and culture of Syria.

The newspaper closed in September 1972.

== See also ==
- Afifa Karam, Al-Hoda journalist
