= Blind River =

There are several places known as Blind River:

- Blind River, Ontario, town in Canada
- Blind River in Algoma District, Ontario, Canada
- Blind River in New Zealand
- Blind River in Louisiana, United States

== See also ==
- Blind (disambiguation)
