= Najeeb Diab =

Syrian nationalist (1870–1936)

- Portrait of Najeeb Diab c. 1913
- Born: Najeeb Moussa Diab; August 6, 1870; Roumieh, Mount Lebanon, Ottoman Syria
- Died: July 11, 1936 (aged 65); Brooklyn, New York, U.S
- Occupation: writer
- Known for: Syrian nationalist, writer, and journalist
- Spouse: Katherine Saba

Najeeb Diab full name Najeeb Moussa Diab (Arabic: نجيب موسى دياب; August 6, 1870 – July 11, 1936) was an early Syrian nationalist, founding owner of major Arabic language newspaper, publisher of Khalil Gibran and major force behind development of Arab-American Al Mahjar literary movement.

== Life and career ==
Najeeb Diab was born in the village of Roumieh, Mount Lebanon (now Lebanon), on August 6, 1870. Following his early education in Lebanon, he attended college in Assiut, Egypt. In 1891 he married Katherine Saba, and they immigrated to the United States from Alexandria, Egypt in 1893. While residing temporarily in Philadelphia, Pennsylvania, with his wife's brother's family, Diab wrote for Kawkab America, the United States' first Arabic language newspaper. The Diab family moved to New York City, the center of early Arab-American journalism, in 1894.

By 1898 Diab was Managing Editor of Kawkab America, and in 1899 he founded and became Managing Editor and Publisher of the newspaper Meraat-ul-Gharb (Mirror of the West), dedicating the paper "to speak for Arabism." The newspaper gained a wide national and international readership and by 1911 was considered "the best Arabic Newspaper" published in the United States. In 1902 the Ottoman Government issued a warrant for his arrest, confiscated his property in Lebanon and sentenced him to death in absentia citing his editorials as encouraging revolution in the Empire. In 1908 Meraat-ul-Gharb was reported as "one of the instruments which incited the Turkish military to its recent revolt" against the Sultan's Government.

Diab was an early activist for Arab independence, first supporting a confederation of Arab States within the Ottoman Empire, and, after World War I, secular republican Arab governments. In June 1913 he was a delegate from America's United Syrian Society, of which he was President and a founding member, to the Arab Congress of 1913, in Paris. In his speech to the Congress, "The Aspirations of the Syrian Emigrants," Diab called for semiautonomous status for Greater Syria within the Ottoman Empire, a strategy that has been called "using the Ottoman Empire as a shield from European ambitions" in the Arab region. Following the dissolution of the Ottoman Empire, Diab, in 1919, opposed a French Mandate for Syria and the Lebanon, and was strongly against France's perceived role as speaking on behalf of the region at the post World War I Paris Peace Conference.

In the early 1920s Diab's editorials in Meraat-ul-Gharb focused on encouragement of an increased Arab nationalist identity based on non-sectarian divisions, and non-intervention by the European nations.

By 1925, Diab supported the Arab revolt against French political rule, writing in Meraat-ul-Gharb: "Today the whole world listens to the voice of Syria…even France listens, which has met their every plea with contempt and disdain." He called for a republic in Syria, encompassing modern-day Lebanon, Jordan and Palestine, writing in 1928, "…the nations of the East, which have tasted the bitterness of individual (divided) rule in the past need no proof of its harmfulness."

Diab advocated immigrant rights in America, and Meraat-ul-Gharb took a strong stand in support of the 1912 Lawrence Textile Strike, during which two Syrian-Americans were killed. He encouraged Arab-American political participation in the United States, supporting perhaps the first Arab-American candidate for public office, Anton Simon, a 1910 GOP candidate for the New York State Senate. He rallied public support, with other notable Arab-Americans in the victory for Arab-American rights to citizenship culminating in the Dow v. United States 1915 Fourth Circuit Court decision affirming these rights.

Throughout his life in the United States, Diab encouraged the mahjar (émigré) literary movement. Meraat-ul-Gharb, through its associated printing house, Meraat Press, published the first Arabic novel in the United States, Salim Sarkis' al-Qulub al-Muttahida fi'l-Wilayat al-Muttahida (United Hearts in the United States) in 1904, and was the primary publisher of the Arabic work of major Lebanese-Syrian émigré writers, including Mikhail Naimy, Kahlil Gibran, and the poet Iliya Abu Madi (Elia D.Madey). In 1918, Abu Madi became Chief Editor of the paper, and married Diab's eldest daughter, Dorothy.

Najeeb Diab had five daughters and a son, and died in Brooklyn, New York on July 11, 1936.
