= Nazik al-Abid =

Syrian activist (1887–1959)

Nazik al-Abid نازك العابد
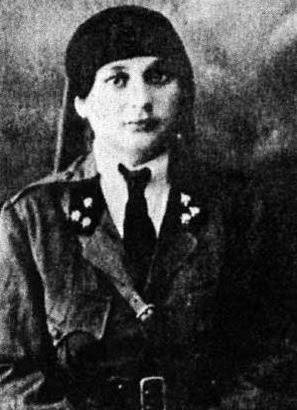
- Al-Abid in military garb before the Battle of Maysalun, 1920
- Born: Nazik Khatim Al ʿAbid Bayhum; 1887; Damascus, Ottoman Syria
- Died: 1959 (aged 71–72); Damascus, Syria
- Other names: Joan of Arc of the Arabs
- Education: BA in agriculture from Women's College in Istanbul
- Occupations: women's rights activist, nationalist, and critic of Ottoman and French colonialism in Syria

Nazik Al Abid (Arabic: نازك العابد; 1887–1959) known as the "Joan of Arc of the Arabs" was a Syrian women's rights activist, nationalist, and critic of Ottoman and French colonialism in Syria. She was the first woman to earn rank in the Syrian Army for her role in forming the Red Star Society, a precursor to the International Red Cross and Red Crescent Movement, during the battle of Maysalun. She was a revolutionary for national independence and women's right to work and vote in Syria.

== Activism ==
=== Against Ottoman Empire ===
Abid was an activist for women's suffrage and resistance to the Ottoman occupation of Syria, often writing under a male pseudonym for Damascus newspapers during the 1919 Syrian women's movement. She established a group to advocate for women's rights in 1914, and was exiled to Cairo by Ottoman leadership, where she stayed until the collapse of the Ottoman Empire in 1918. In 1919, Abid founded Nur al-Fayha' (Light of Damascus) society and magazine, and later, in 1922, a school of the same name which offered English and sewing courses for young girl orphans of the war dead.

=== Against French occupation of Syria ===
As the head of a women's delegation to the King-Crane Commission, Abid spoke to American diplomats without a veil to signal her intention for a secular rule of Syria, and to testify against the French mandate for occupation.

In 1920, Abid founded the Red Star Association, an early form of the Red Crescent Society, and was awarded the rank of "honorary president" of the Syrian Army by Prince Faysal. Abid led Red Star nurses in the Syrian Army's battle against French forces during the Battle of Maysalun in July 1920. Despite being exiled by the French government after the defeat of the Syrian Army, Abid was hailed domestically as the Joan of Arc of Syria. As the first woman general in Syria, she was photographed in military uniform and without a hijab, but returned to wearing a veil after outcry from conservatives.

The French government granted her amnesty in 1921, and Abid returned to Syria on the condition that she avoid politics. After founding the Light of Damascus school that year - viewed as competition for resources with French humanitarian agencies and programs—the French authorities threatened to arrest her, and she fled Syria for Lebanon.

=== Women's rights ===
Nazik al-Abid founded the "Shami Women’s Club" in 1920 alongside fellow Syrian feminist Mary Ajami.

In 1933 she founded Niqâbat al-Mar'a al-'Amila (The Working Women's Society), which worked on labor issues on behalf of women in Syria, advocating economic liberation as a means to political liberation for women.

== Personal life ==
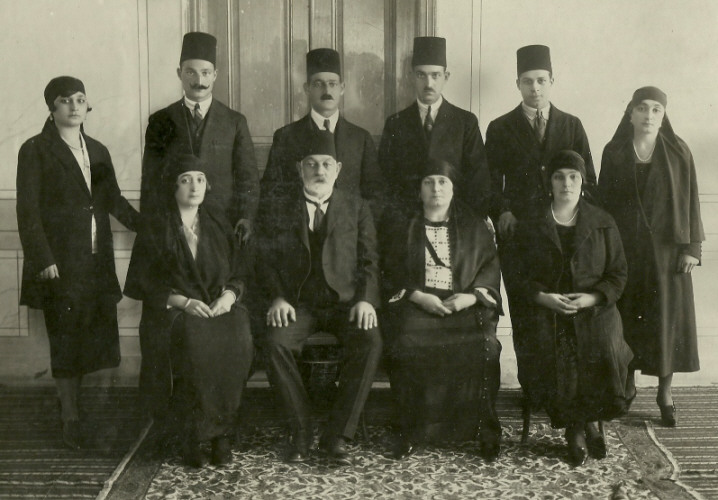
A family photo with Nazik standing on the left. Her sister, Soraya Al-Abed, standing on the right, her brothers in the back row are Hulu, Mazhar, Nihad and Adel, and the seated sisters are Aisha and Rafia.

Abid was born into an influential Damascene family. Her father, Mustafa al-Abid, was an aristocrat charged with administrative affairs in Kirk and later as an envoy to Mosul under Ottoman Sultan Abdulhamid II; she was the niece of Ahmad Izza al-Abid, a judge and advisor to the sultan. While living in Turkey, she was educated in several languages in Turkish, American and French schools. She graduated with a BA in agriculture from the Women's College in Istanbul. Her family was exiled to Egypt for ten years after the CUP 1908 revolution.

In 1922, after her exile to Lebanon, she met and married Lebanese intellectual and politician, Muhammad Jamil Bayhum.
