= Blind (surname) =

Blind is a Dutch, English, and German surname. Notable people with the surname include:

- Daley Blind (born 1990), Dutch footballer
- Danny Blind (born 1961), Dutch footballer and coach
- Karl Blind (1826–1907), German revolutionist and writer
- Knut Blind (born 1965), German economist
- Mathilde Blind (1841–1896, born as Mathilda Cohen), German-English writer
- Roswitha Blind, German mathematician
