= Blinds (disambiguation) =

Blinds or window blinds are a window covering composed of long strips of fabric or rigid material.

Blinds may also refer to:

- Blinds (poker), forced bets posted by players in poker
- Blinds.com, an e-commerce retailer of window coverings
- WindowBlinds, a computer program that allows users to skin the Windows graphical user interface

== See also ==
- Blind (disambiguation)
