= Blinded =

Blinded may refer to:

- Blinded (1997 film), a French romantic thriller by Daniel Calparsoro
- Blinded (2004 film), a British film by Eleanor Yule
- Blinded (2006 film), a Grenadian film by Anderson Quarless
- Blinded (TV series), a Swedish television drama series
- "Blinded" (song), a song by Third Eye Blind
- The Blinded, a Swedish melodic death metal band
- Blindness, the physiological condition of lacking visual perception

== See also ==
- Blind (disambiguation)
