= Salloum Mokarzel =

- Born: 1881; Freike, Mount Lebanon Mutasarrifate, Ottoman Syria
- Died: January 2, 1952 (aged 70–71); Brooklyn, N.Y
- Occupations: journalist, writer
- Relatives: Antoun Mokarzel (father); Barbara Akl (mother); Naoum Mokarzel (brother); Catherine Mokarzel (sister); Elizabeth Mokarzel (sister)
- Writing career
- Movements: Mahjar, New York Pen League

Salloum Antoun Mokarzel (Arabic: سلوم مكرزل1881–1952) was an influential Lebanese American intellectual and publisher. He was the younger brother of Naoum Mokarzel who was the founder of Al-Hoda, one of the first Arabic language newspapers published in the United States. Between December 1918 and June 1926, he published and edited "The Syrian-American Commercial Magazine" ("المجلة التجارية السورية الأمريكية"), also known as "The New World" ("العالم الجديد"). In 1926, he founded and published The Syrian World, a magazine that published articles on the history and culture of the region of Syria, which at the time consisted of and referred to the modern day states and territories of Syria, Lebanon, Jordan, and Palestine. After The Syrian World ceased publication as a magazine in 1932, Salloum converted the publication to a weekly newspaper. After Naoum's death in 1932, Salloum took over Al-Hoda, which passed at his death in 1952 to his daughter Mary. The newspaper closed in 1971.
