= Al-Funoon =

Arabic-language magazine

- Founder: Nasib Arida
- First issue: 1913
- Final issue: 1918
- Country: United States
- Based in: New York City
- Language: Arabic

Al-Funoon (Arabic: الفنون, romanized: al-funūn, lit. 'The Arts') was an Arabic-language magazine founded in New York City by Nasib Arida in 1913 and co-edited by Mikhail Naimy, "so that he might display his knowledge of international literature." As worded by Suheil Bushrui, it was "the first attempt at an exclusively literary and artistic magazine by the Arab immigrant community in New York." Khalil Gibran had contributed to the magazine.

According to author Suheil B. Bushrui, "Although moderately successful to begin with, publication became intermittent before the magazine folded in 1918." According to historian Hani J. Bawardi, "Al-Funūn is still considered one of the most influential magazines in Arab literary history despite its constant financial troubles during its short life. The magazine's nationalism accounted for much of its influence."

== Bibliography ==
- Bawardi, Hani J. (2015). The Making of Arab Americans: From Syrian Nationalism to U.S. Citizenship (1st ed.). Texas: University of Texas Press. ISBN 978-1-47730-752-6.
