= Nur al-Fayha =

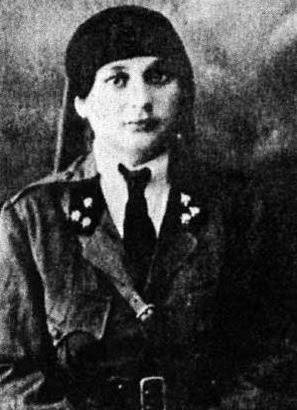
Naziq al-Abid, 1920

Nur al-Fayha ("Light of Damascus"), was a women's rights organization in Syria, active during the Faisal government, between January 1919 and July 1920.

The organization was composed of a group of elite women married to male modernist politicians and loyalists of the Faisal government. They spoke in favor of women's liberation for the benefit of the nation in line with the nationalist modernist view and founded a girls' school and a magazine where they favored this idea. While the organization did not last long, it played a significant pioneer role in the Syrian women's movement and has been referred to as the first women's organization in Damascus (and Syria).

== History ==
The Nur al-Fayha was founded in January 1919 by a group of elite women in Damascus under the leadership of Nazik al-Abid. This was during an intense period of political nationalism during the establishment of the Faisal government, before it was defeated by the French in July in 1920.

The purpose of the organization was the mobilise the women of the nation in work for the independence of the country and support of the government, and in line with the modernist nationalist perspective of the time, this mobilization included women's liberation, and supported "women's awakening, literary societies, and philanthropic works". In line with modernist principles, the Nur al-Fayha wished to benefit the building of a strong nation by women's participation and liberation: it wished to lessen the difference between Muslim and Western women in "knowledge (ilm) and progress (ruqiy)", and praised the "modern ideas" (afkar haditha), which was supported by the elite of educated male modernist reformists "enlightened ones" (mutanawwirun), to whom most of the members where related and married.

While the Nur al-Fayha considered unveiling of the hijab in Syria as too sensitive an issue to campaign in favor of it, it indirectly supported it; the leader, Nazik al-Abid, her mother and many other members appeared unveiled in public in gender-mixed company in 1919, such as at the visit by Gertrude Bell as well as during the meeting with the King-Crane Commission. During the visit of the King–Crane Commission in Damascus in 1919, women's rights activists (of the Nur al-Fayha) attended unveiled to demonstrate the progressive modernist ambitions of the Faisal Government.

Women's rights activists in the modernist Interwar period viewed the veil as a hindrance to women's participation in society as productive citizens, preventing them from benefiting a successful independent nation, and combined their criticism against hijab with their criticism against colonialism. During a nationalist demonstration in Damascus during a visit of Lord Balfour the women demanded the abolition of the veil, which created tension with their male counterparts. When a petition on women's suffrage was discussed in the Syrian Congress in 1920, Shaykh Abd al-Qadir al-Kaylani stated that to given women the right to vote would be the same thing as abolish sex segregation and allow women to appear unveiled. The Government stated that women would be allowed to remove their veil when conditions allowed for it, but criticism from male conservatives caused the government to warn women from dressing provocatively in April 1920.

In June 1920, the Red Star Society was founded by the Nur al-Fayha, in order to nurse the soldiers of the government, and several of the members of the Nur al-Fayha became members of the Red Star Society. Since the government was defeated by the French the same year, however, the Nur al-Fayha was not revived. It was replaced as the leading force of the Syrian women's movement by the Syrian-Lebanese Women's Union.

=== School ===
The Nur al-Fayha founded a girls' school, School for the Daughters of the Martyrs, where girls related to soldiers were allowed to study in accordance with the modernist ideals.

== Magazine ==
The Nur al-Fayha also published a magazine with the same name in order to propagate its ideals, published from February 1920. It was also published abroad; however, due to the majority of Muslim women being illiterate, its circulation was limited.
