= Nageeb Arbeely =

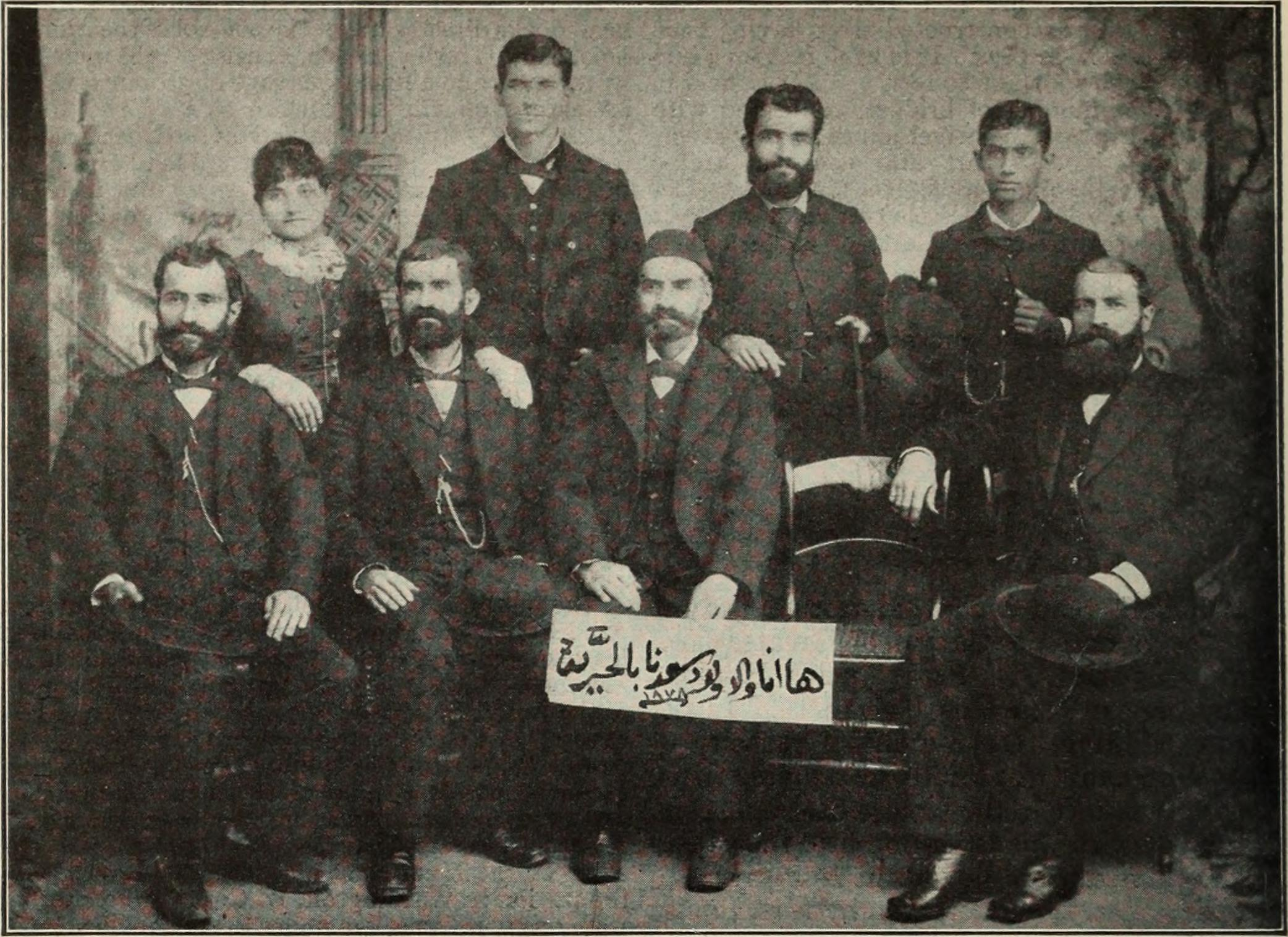
- Portrait of the Arbeely family, Nageeb is seated first to the left
- Born: Nageeb Arbeely; July , 1863; Damascus, Ottoman Syria
- Died: January 28, 1904 (aged 40); Brooklyn, New York, U.S
- Occupations: lawyer and newspaper publisher
- Known for: American consul
- Spouse: Marie N. Dilopoulo

Nageeb Arbeely (July 1863 – January 28, 1904) was a naturalized-American of Syrian descent, appointed by President Grover Cleveland to the post of Consul in Jerusalem in 1885.

Though Arbeely was popular among the American Colony, he was deemed unacceptable by the Ottoman Empire and within a year was recalled from his position in Jerusalem.

== Biography ==
Born in Damascus, Ottoman Syria, to Professor Joseph A. Arbeely, Nageeb immigrated with his parents and siblings to the United States in 1878. The Arbeelys were the first Syrian family to seek refuge in the U.S., and as Christians they had been persecuted in the Ottoman Empire. They settled in Tennessee and after completing his studies at Maryville College, Arbeely was appointed there as a professor of French, where he also gave illustrated lectures on the Holy Land.

At the age of 24 Arbeely was appointed by President Grover Cleveland as consul to Jerusalem. Though the American Colonists were enthusiastic about his appointment, the Ottoman Empire deemed him unacceptable as a consul, claiming that as Arbeely had been born in Syria, then part of the Ottoman Empire, he could not also serve there as a representative of the United States. It was rumored corruption and bribery, stemming from Selah Merrill whom Arbeely had replaced as consul, were employed in removing Arbeely from his appointment. Arbeely was recalled within a year of his being appointed.

Upon his return to the United States, Arbeely was a business promoter for the "Streets of Cairo" exhibit at the Chicago World's Fair in 1893; the 1901 Buffalo World's Fair and the 1904 St. Louis World's Fair. He served as an interpreter in the New York City barge office, and later as an inspector in the Bureau of Immigration at the Port of New York. Working with his brother, Dr. Abraham J. Arbeely, they established the first Arabic newspaper published in the United States, the Kawkab America (Star of America).

Arbeely later pursued a career in law and was admitted to the New York bar. He was also one of the founders of, and President of, the Syrian Society of New York.

He married Marie N. Dilopoulo on September 3, 1892, in Manhattan.

In 1904, Arbeely died while in his law office. He was mourned at large among the Syrian community of New York. The funeral was held in the Greek Orthodox Church of Brooklyn.
