= Knut Blind =

German economist (born 1965)

- Born: 1965 (age 60–61)
- Education: University of Freiburg (1995, PhD)
- Scientific career
- Fields: Innovation economics
- Workplaces: Technische Universität Berlin; Erasmus University Rotterdam; Fraunhofer FOKUS; Fraunhofer ISI

Knut Blind (born 1965) is a German economist. He is active in the fields of innovation economics focusing on regulation and standardization.

== Career ==
Knut Blind studied economics, political science and psychology at the University of Freiburg in Germany and Brock University in Canada. He worked as a research assistant in the department of public finance at the University of Freiburg, where he was awarded his doctorate. Blind was promoted to professor at the University of Kassel, Germany. Since 2006, he has worked as a professor at Technische Universität Berlin, Chair for Innovation Economics. Between 2008 and 2016 he has also been awarded the Endowed Chair in Standardisation at the Rotterdam School of Management by the Erasmus University Rotterdam. Between 2010 and 2019 Knut Blind moved to the Fraunhofer Institute for Open Communications Systems FOKUS in Berlin. Since October 2019 Knut Blind is Head of the Business Unit Regulation and Innovation at the Fraunhofer Institute for Systems and Innovation Research ISI in Karlsruhe.

In 2012, he initiated the Berlin Innovation Panel. It is conducted annually by the Leibniz Centre for European Economic Research (ZEW) in parallel to the Innovation Panel surveyed for the Federal Republic of Germany and collects empirical data on innovation activity in the Berlin economy.

In 2012, Knut Blind initiated the German Standardisation Panel (DNP), which, with the support of the German Institute for Standardisation (DIN e. V.) and the German Commission for Electrical, Electronic & Information Technologies (DKE) in DIN and VDE, conducts an annual survey among organisations on the subject of standardisation under the auspices of the Federal Ministry of Economics and Climate Action. In April 2023, he was commissioned by the European Commission's Directorate-General for Research and Innovation to conduct the European Standardisation Panel.. The second edition of this survey was launched in December 2025.

== Publications ==
Blind has published his work in several high-ranking international journals, including Research Policy, Industrial and Corporate Change, IEEE Transactions on Engineering Management, Journal of Technology Transfer, Telecommunications Policy and Journal of Productivity Analysis. For his lifetime achievement, he has been credited as one of the leading German economists and has been listed in the Handelsblatt-Management-Ranking since 2009, which was adopted by Wirtschaftswoche in 2018. In the ranking of Research.com from February 2022, he was listed under the Top 10 of the German managements scholar on basis of the Hirsch-Index. Furthermore, in 2013, he was listed as one of the most influential German economist by the F.A.Z. Economic Rating. In January 2017, Makronom lists Blind on position 78 of the most influential German-speaking economists on Twitter. Blind was awarded with the F.A. v. Hayek-Prize by the Department of Economics at the University of Freiburg for his dissertation.

== Honors and awards ==
- 2026: Honorary Doctoral Degree in Technology from the Lappeenranta–Lahti University of Technology LUT
- 2026: Industry and Innovation Best Paper Prize for "The impact of the EU General data protection regulation on product innovation" co-authored with Crispin Niebel and Christian Rammer
- 2017: Member of the German Academy of Science and Engineering (acatech)
- 2016: ISPIM Knut Holt Best Paper Award for "To Standardize or to Patent? Development of a Decision Making Tool and Recommendations for Young Companies" co-authored with Nizar Abdelkafi, Sergiy Makhotin, Marina Thuns and Anna Pohle from Fraunhofer Center for International Management and Knowledge Economy
- 2015: Second best paper award for the paper "Regulation and Standardization of Data Protection in Cloud Computing" coauthored by Martin Löhe (Technische Universität Berlin, Germany) at the ITU Kaleidoscope 2015 Conference "Trust in the Information Society"
- 2013: WISU Prof-Homepage of the month October 2013
- 2012: IEC-IEEE 2nd Prize awarded for the paper "The benefits of standards and standardization in the German electric and electronic industry" together with Dr. Axel Mangelsdorf
