= Kawkab America =

Arabic-language newspaper

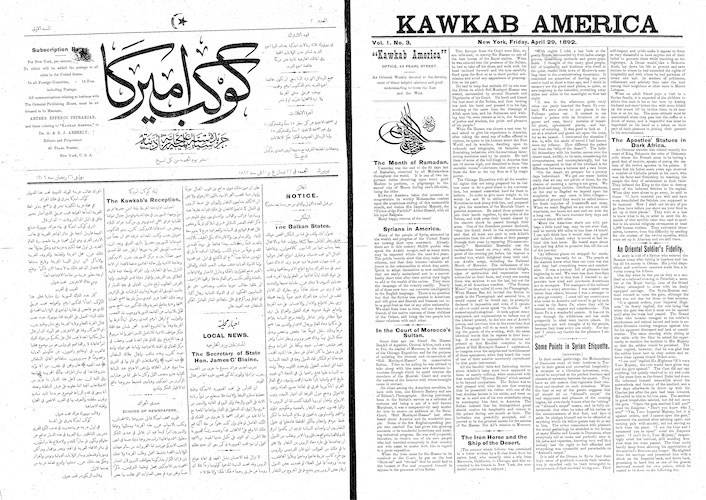
- English and Arabic covers of "Kawkab America"
- Type: weekly (later Daily newspaper)
- Format: Broadsheet
- Owner(s): Najeeb and Ibrahim Arbeely
- Publisher: Nageeb and Ibrahim Arbeely
- Staff writers: 5
- Founded: April 15, 1892; 134 years ago
- Ceased publication: 1907
- Headquarters: New York City
- Country: United States

Kawkab America (Arabic: كوكب أميركا, 'Star of America' or literal translation 'Planet of America') was an Arabic-language weekly (later daily) newspaper published in New York City, United States. Kawkab America was the first Arabic-language newspaper in North America; it was published by Syrian Orthodox Christians, and its readership was almost exclusively Christian. Typeset by hand, Kawkab America was published between 1892 and 1908. It became a daily in 1898.

Politically, Kawkab America was highly supportive of Ottoman rule (at least during its early years). Initially, the launching of the newspaper had been scheduled for the birthday of the Ottoman Sultan. However, it was delayed as the Arabic printing press had not arrived on time. The first issue came out on April 15, 1892, carrying a major article of praise of the Sultan. However, according to an 1898 article in The New York Times, Kawkab America represented the Young Turks Party in the United States and condemned repression against Armenians in the Ottoman Empire.

There are different claims about who was the founder of the newspaper. Some historians claim the newspaper was founded by the brothers Najeeb and Ibrahim Arbeely (who belonged to a prominent Syrian family), and that the founding editor was Najeeb Diab. Lilian George Shoucair claims that her father, Saed Shoucair, was the founding editor of Kawkab America and that the Arbeelys financed its publishing. She also stated that Saed Shoucair later bought the newspaper from the Arbeelys and that he had left it when he moved out of the city in 1907.

Kawkab America was the transliteration used at the time of publishing. However, the Library of Congress used the more direct transliteration Kawkab Amirka. Only the issues of the first four years have been preserved.

== See also ==
- List of Arab American writers
