= Meraat-ul-Gharb =

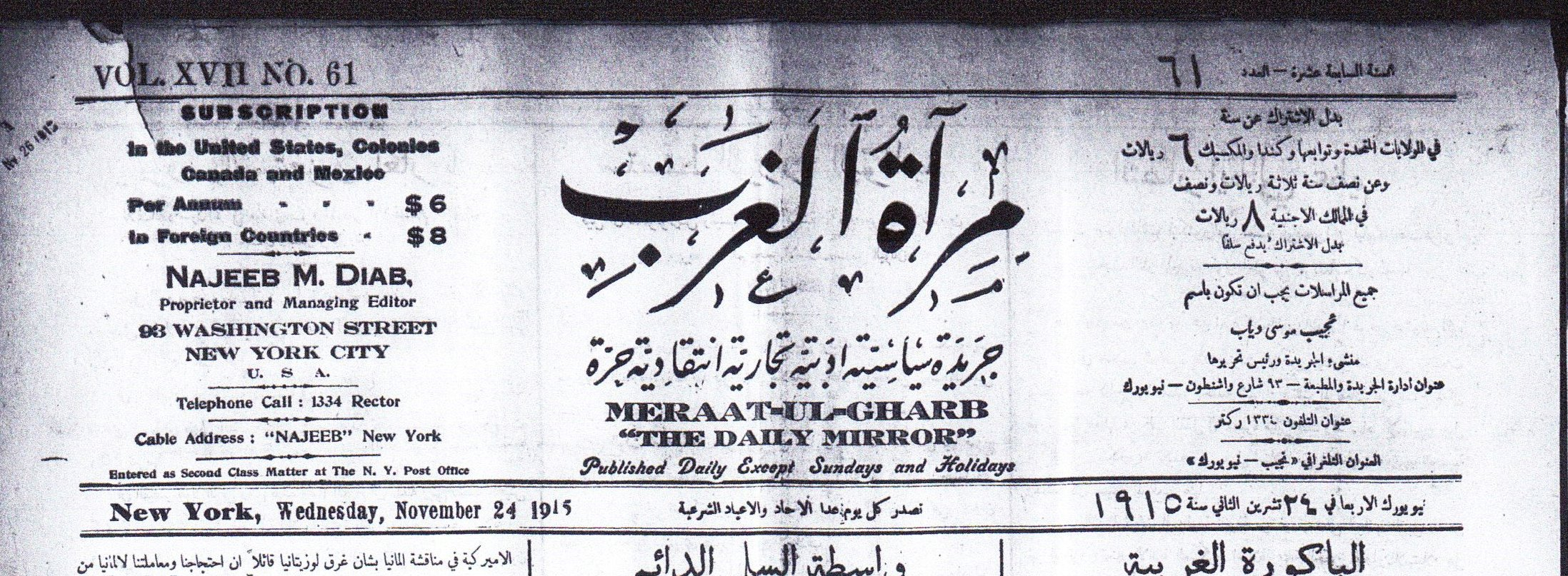
- Meraat-ul-Gharb Masthead
- Founder: Najeeb Diab
- Founded: 1899
- Ceased publication: 1961-2013
- Language: Arabic
- Headquarters: New York City
- Country: United States

Meraat-ul-Gharb (Arabic: مرآة الغرب, romanized: mirʾāt al-ġarb, lit. 'Mirror of the West') is an Arabic-language newspaper founded and published in New York City by Najeeb Diab in 1899. By 1911, it was considered "the best Arabic newspaper" published in the United States. In 1908, Meraat-ul-Gharb was reported to be "one of the instruments […] which incited the Turkish military to its recent revolt" against the Ottoman Sultan's Government.

The newspaper published many of the Mahjar (emigree) writers in its columns, and was an early vehicle for the writing of Kahlil Gibran (1910), Mikhail Naimy (1915), Ameen Rihani (1916), and Ilya Abu Madi (1918). The paper's political views and editorials were, in its earliest issues, anti-Ottoman and then anti-Turk. Later it supported a federal Middle East, to include Syria, Palestine, and Lebanon. It was strongly against French colonialism in the region.

Its printing house published such works as Kahlil Gibran's novel Broken Wings in 1912.

The magazine initially ceased publication in 1961, but has since been revived in New York City in 2013 with the same Arabic name as an apolitical online and physical Arabic language literature, poetry, culture, and medicine magazine.

Editors: 1899-1916: Najeeb Diab; 1916-1918: William Catzeflis; 1918-1928: Iliya Abu Madi; 1928-1936: Najeeb Diab; 1937-1946: Nasib Arida; 1946-1961: Farid Ghosn

Post-Revival:

2013–present: Kamal Taoube, M.D.
