= Muhammad Jamil Bayham =

Lebanese author and politician

- محمد جميل بيهم
- Born: 1887; Beirut
- Died: 1978 (aged 90–91)
- Citizenship: Lebanon
- Notable work: The Arabs and the Turks in the Conflict between East and West and The Philosophy of Ottoman History
- Spouse: Nazik al-Abid

Muhammad Jamil Bayham (Arabic: محمد جميل بيهم; 1887–1978) was an Arab-Lebanese historian, politician, writer and reformer who wrote dozens of books and articles.

Hailing from an influential Sunni Muslim family in Beirut, Bayham advocated for Arab unity, emphasizing Arab pride, and asserting the preeminent position of Arabs in Islam. He was a staunch opponent of French rule and expressed disagreement with Lebanese people, particularly Christians, who asserted a Phoenician identity.

Bayham worked for the independence of Syria and Lebanon, defended the Arabism of Palestine, and called for the liberation of women. He is considered a pioneer of the political, social and intellectual renaissance in Lebanon and the Arab world.

== Family ==
Muhammad Jamil bin Muhammad Mustafa bin Hussein Bayhum Al-Itan was born and died in Beirut. He was descended from the Itani family. The Beyham family was active in political, social and economic activities. Ibrahim Beyhem Pasha was an amir (prince), and Sultan Suleiman the Magnificent appointed him to command the Ottoman fleet; he became grand vizier in 1522 AD. Najib Beyhem Al-Itani had close ties with Pope Lewn. Hussein Beyhum was known for his charitable deeds in Beirut and elsewhere in Lebanon, and the family was associated with Prince Bashir Al-Shihabi. Omar Bey Beyhem was the head of the Shura Council during the era of Egyptian rule from 1831 to 1840. When Sheikh Saeed Jumblatt was imprisoned in Beirut in the wake of the 1860 civil conflict, Mustafa Effendi Beyhem cared for him in prison.

== Cultural and intellectual activity ==
Bayham held a number of political and scientific positions. In 1905, he became a member of the Makassed Islamic Charitable Association in Beirut. Bayham became a member of the Islamic Charitable Society in Istanbul in 1908. In 1910, he was appointed to the Ottoman fleet management board. Bayham was appointed to the Beirut Municipal Council in 1915. The following year, he became honorary head of the Agricultural Bank branch in Beirut vilayet. Bayham was appointed as a deputy in the Arab government in 1919, and received a doctoral degree on the mandate over Syria and Iraq from the University of Paris in 1928. He was a member of the Syrian Reform Party, defending Arabic language and literature, and became a member of the Lebanese Scientific Academy in 1929 and the Iraqi Scientific Academy a decade later. Bayham headed the Union of Parties Lebanese Anti-Zionist movement in 1944. He defended the political and social rights of women. Bayham and his wife Nazik al-Abid founded an association to combat prostitution in 1933, defying French Mandate officials who encouraged Lebanese prostitution with legislation.

=== Works ===
- Women in Modern Civilization (1927)
- Women in History and Laws
- Women in Arab Civilization
- Palestine: Andalusia of the East (1946)
- The Philosophy of Ottoman History in Two Parts (1925–1954)
- The Girl of the East in the Civilization of the West
- The Veteran Era in Syria and Lebanon
- The Arabness of Lebanon
- Lebanon Between East and West
- Political Tendencies in Lebanon
- The Two Mandates in Iraq and Syria
- Arab Convoys and Processions Through the Ages (two parts)
- The Missing Link in the History of the Arabs
- Arabism and Modern Populism
- A Modern Free World
- Arab Unity Between the Tides
- The First Sultans of Turkey
- Arabs and Turks in the Conflict Between East and West
- The Philosophy of the History of Muhammad
- Study and Analysis of the Original Arab Era
- Women in Islam and Western Civilization
