= Blind (band) =

Australian Christian rock band from Wollongong

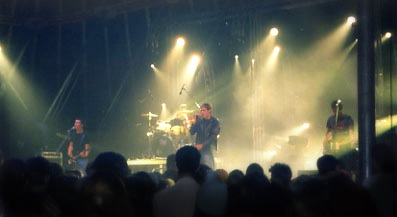

Background information
- Origin: Wollongong, Australia
- Genres: Rock
- Years active: 1999–2005
- Labels: Down Under Christian Music Group; Three:16 Records; Toupee Records
- Past members: Greg Bell; Michael Molkentin; Adrian Deck; Chris Stewart (1999–2000); Andrew Nicholls (2001–2004)

Blind was an Australian Christian rock band formed in Wollongong, Australia in 1999 and consisted of Greg Bell (guitar), Adrian Deck (drums/vocals), Andrew Nicholls (vocals 2001–2005), Michael Molkentin (bass) and Chris Stewart (vocals 1999–2000).

== Blind, 1999–2005 ==
The band, formed by former members of Wollongong rock and funk bands '"Apartment"' (Deck) and '"Funkin' Unreal"' (Bell, Molkentin) in 1999, released their first self-recorded EP early the following year. Their music, consisting of a pop/funk feel, was not outwardly overtly Christian in nature, but instead focused more on themes of their faith that often touched on secular ideas. After building up a loyal fan base in Sydney and Illawarra areas, Chris announced his leaving the band.

With Andrew Nicholls taking over vocal duties in 2001, Blind recorded their first full-length album, Long Walk Home. This album was released under the Down Under Christian Music Group labels and saw the band gain radio play on local commercial stations. In late 2001, the song "Divinely Beautiful" was featured on the compilation Down Under 2002: Australasia's 35 Hottest Christian Artists, and the band began intensive summer touring that would see them regular visitors to towns and cities along Australia's eastern coast.

In 2002, with the album Echoes, the band signed with Three:16 Records and worked with noted producer Caleb James, gaining limited airplay on Australian national youth-oriented radio station Triple J. Blind's work with James continued with the critically acclaimed 2003 album October Observations. The band, now a major Christian act within Australia, made major billing for a number of music festivals throughout 2003 and 2004 in Sydney, Melbourne and Brisbane, including the Black Stump Music and Arts Festival on the outskirts of Sydney. The band broke up in 2005 to allow band members to pursue other projects. Bell started another band 'The Dawn Collective', which Molkentin played bass in until late 2006. Nicholls, Molkentin and Deck are currently members of the experimental group Spurs.

== Releases ==
=== EPs ===
- Blind (2000)
- Blind Date (2000)

=== Albums ===
- Long Walk Home (Produced by Andy Sorenson, 2001)
- Echoes (Produced by Caleb James, 2002)
- October Observations (Produced by Caleb James, 2003)
- A Song Before We Sleep (2004)

== Members ==
- Greg Bell – guitars/vocals
- Andrew Nicholls – vocals (2001–2005)
- Michael Molkentin – bass
- Adrian Deck – drums/vocals
- Chris Stewart – vocals (1999–2000)
