= Elia Abu Madi =

Lebanese-American poet (1890–1957)

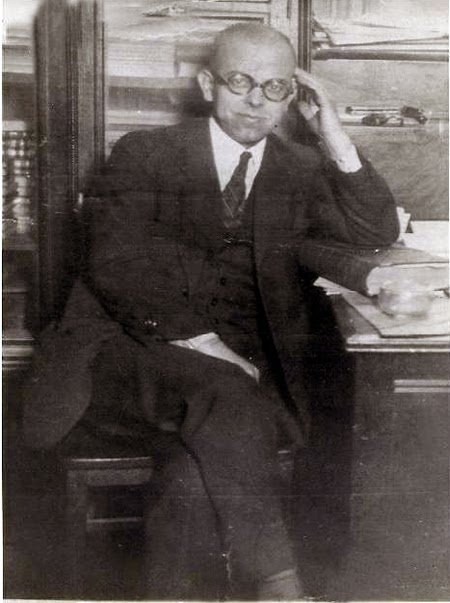
- Born: إيليا أبو ماضي (Īlyā Abū Māḍī ) May 15, 1890; Mount Lebanon Mutasarrifate, Ottoman Syria
- Died: November 23, 1957 (aged 67); New York, United States
- Occupations: Poet; journalist; publisher
- Relatives
- Writing career
- Genre: poetry
- Literary movement: Mahjar (The Pen League), New York City

Elia Abu Madi (also known as Elia D. Madey; Arabic: إيليا أبو ماضي Īlyā Abū Māḍī (Note: Lebanese Arabic Transliteration: Īlya Abu Māḍi, pronounced [ˈʔiːlja (ʔa)buˈmɑːdi].)) (May 15, 1890 – November 23, 1957) was a Lebanese-born American poet.

== Early life ==
Abu Madi was born in the village of Al-Muhaydithah, now part of Bikfaya, Lebanon, on May 15, 1890, to a Greek Orthodox Christian family. At the age of 11 he moved to (Alexandria, Egypt) where he worked with his uncle.

== Career and works ==
In 1911, Elia Abu Madi published his first collection of poems, Tazkar al-Madi. Shortly after, he was exiled by the Ottoman authorities and he left Egypt for the United States, where he settled in Cincinnati, Ohio. In 1916, he moved to New York City and began a career in journalism. In New York, Abu Madi met and worked with a number of Arab-American poets including Gibran Khalil Gibran. He married the daughter of Najeeb Diab, editor of the Arabic-language magazine Meraat-ul-Gharb, and became its chief editor in 1918. His second poetry collection, Diwan Iliya Abu Madi, was published in New York in 1919; his third and most important collection, Al-Jadawil ("The Streams"), appeared in 1927. His other books were Al-Khama'il ("The Thickets") (1940) and Tibr wa Turab (posthumous, 1960).

In 1929, Abu Madi founded his own periodical, As-Samir, in Brooklyn. It began as a monthly but after a few years it was published five times a week.

His poems are very well known among Arabs; poet, author, and journalist Gregory Orfalea wrote that "his poetry is as commonplace and memorized in the Arab world as that of Robert Frost is in ours." (Note: In A Community of Many Worlds: Arab Americans in New York City, ed. Kathleen Benson, Syracuse University Press, 2002, page 62.)

== See also ==
- New York Pen League

== Sources ==
- Salma Khadra Jayyusi, Trends and Movements in Modern Arabic Poetry, Brill, 1977.
- Encyclopedia of Islam, Brill, 1980.
- The New Anthology of American Poetry, eds. Steven Gould Axelrod, Camille Roman, Thomas J. Travisano, Rutgers University Press, 2005.
- Orfalea, Gregory; Elmusa, Sharif, eds. (1999). Grape Leaves: A Century of Arab-American Poetry. New York: Interlink. pp. 65–82. ISBN 1566563380.
- Poeti arabi a New York. Il circolo di Gibran, introduzione e traduzione di F. Medici, prefazione di A. Salem, Palomar, Bari 2009. ISBN 88-7600-340-1. ISBN 978-88-7600-340-0.

== Scholarly criticism ==
- Ahmad, Imtyaz. "Abu Madi: A Voice of Modernity in Contemporary Arabic Poetry" (PDF). Archived from the original (PDF) on August 15, 2016.
- Alawi, Nabil. "Arab American Poets: The Politics of Exclusion and Assimilation" (PDF). Archived from the original (PDF) on August 18, 2016.
- Boullata, Issa J. "Iliya Abu Madi and the Riddle of Life in His Poetry" Journal of Arabic Literature, 1986; 17: 69–81. (journal article)
- Nijland, Cornelis. "Religious Motifs and Themes in North American Mahjar Poetry" pp. 161–81 IN: Borg, Gert (ed. and introd.); De Moor, Ed (ed.); Representations of the Divine in Arabic Poetry. Amsterdam, Netherlands: Rodopi; 2001. 239 pp. (book article)
- Romy, Cynthia Johnson. Diwan Al-Jadawil of Iliya Abu Madi (Masterʻs thesis, University of Arizona). Retrieved from http://hdl.handle.net/10150/291551
