= The Syrian World =

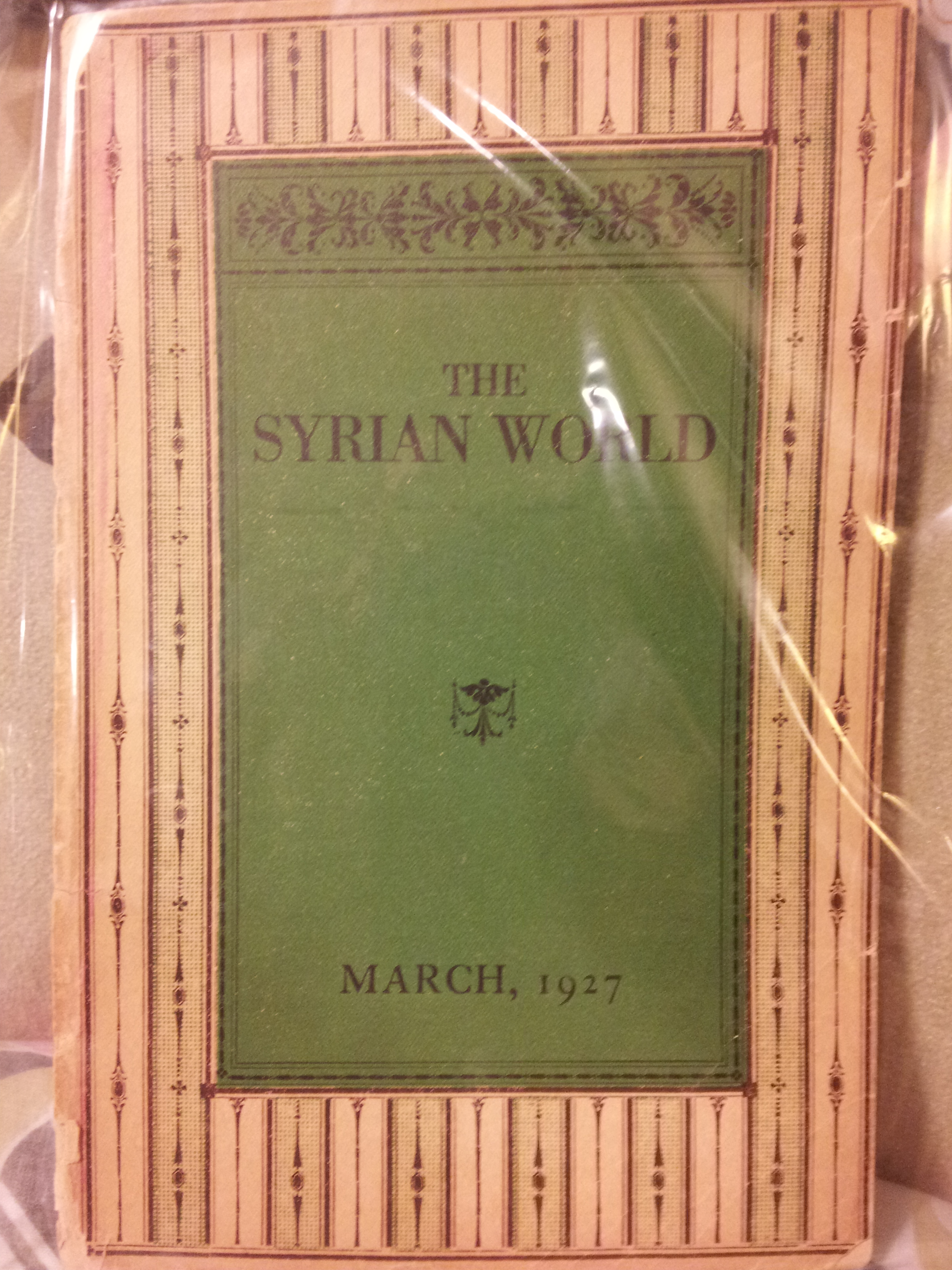
- 1927 magazine cover of the Syrian world
- Editor: Salloum A. Mokarzel
- Categories: Culture; Literature
- Publisher: Syrian-American Press
- Founded: 1926
- Final issue: 1932
- Country: United States
- Based in: New York City
- Language: English

The Syrian World was a short-lived magazine devoted to the celebration and cultural diffusion of Syria, which at the time consisted and referred to the modern day states and territories of Syria, Lebanon, Jordan, and Palestine. It was the first English-language magazine in the USA, which was established by a Syrian immigrant. The magazine was headquartered in New York City.

== History ==
The Syrian World was founded in 1926 by the Lebanese American journalist and intellectual, Salloum Mokarzel. The magazine was printed entirely in English and was pitched to the first generation Syrians; who were born in the United States. Salloum founded the magazine as a non-sectarian and non-partisan publication that would seek, to educate the first generation of Syrian-Americans of their illustrious and ancient cultural heritage, and to strengthen their ties to their culture. In the second year of its publication, 1927, a single issue cost 50 cents, and a yearly subscription set back the reader 5 dollars. Although very popular when it was founded, it proved difficult to keep afloat during the Great Depression, and it ceased publication in 1932. However, after 1932 The Syrian World was turned into a weekly newspaper.

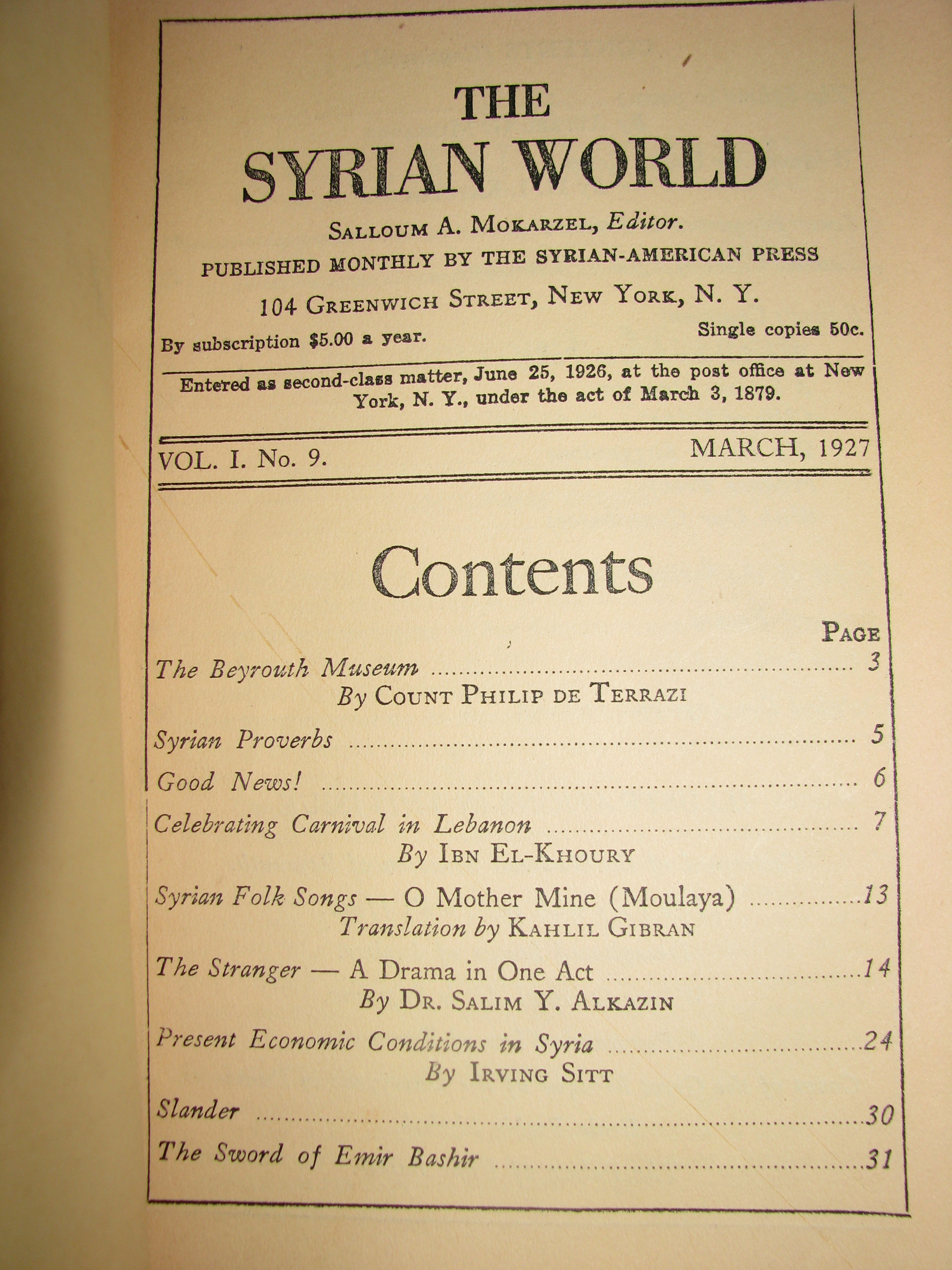
Table of Contents, March 1927 issue
