= List of magazines in Egypt =

The history of magazines in Egypt is long, dating back to the 1890s. The earliest magazines included women's magazines as well as those published in Turkish from 1828 to 1947. In 1919 there were nearly more than thirty women's magazines in the country. The first children's magazine was published in 1893. The number of the magazines in the period 1828–1929 was 481.

In 2014 the magazine market in the country was described as one of the lower-growth, smaller-scale markets.

The following is an incomplete list of current and defunct magazines published in Egypt. They may be published in Arabic or in other languages.

== A ==
- Abu Naddara
- Adab wa Naqd
- Ad-Diya
- Al-Ahali
- Al Ahram Al Arabi
- Al Ahram Al Iktisadi
- Al Ahram Al Riyadi
- Al-Ahram Weekly
- Akhbar Al-Adab
- Akher Saa
- Al Alam
- Al Arghul
- Anis al-Jalis
- Apollo
- Arab Observer
- Arek Monthly
- Arev Monthly
- Ar-Rawi
- Arrissalah
- Artemis
- Al-'Arus
- Al-'Arusa
- L'Aurore
- Az-Zuhur

== B ==
- Baba Sadiq
- Al-Balagh al-Usbuʿi
- Al Bayan
- Bint Al Nil
- Business Today Egypt

== C ==
- Cairo 360
- Cairo Times
- Cairo West Magazine

== D ==
- Al Dawa
- Don Quichotte

== E ==
- Egypt Today
- Elle Egypt
- L'Égyptienne
- El-Shai.com

== F ==
- Al Fajr
- Al Fajr Al Jadid
- Al-Fatat
- Fatat al-Sharq
- Al Fath
- La Femme Nouvelle
- Al Fukaha

== G ==
- Galerie 68

== H ==
- Hawaa
- Al Hilal
- HR Revolution Middle East

== I ==
- Ibdaa
- İctihat
- Israël

== J ==
- Al-Jamia
- Al Jamila

== K ==
- Kanun-i Esasi
- Al Kashkul
- Al-Katib al-misri
- Al Kawakib
- Kull shay

== L ==
- Al Lataif
- Lotus
- Lounge

== M ==
- Magazette
- Al Majalla
- Majallat Al Azhar
- Al Majalla Al Jadida
- Al Manar
- Al-Maʿrifa
- Al-Muqtataf
- Al-Musawar

== N ==
- Al Nadhir
- Nesf El Donya

== O ==
- October
- Omdurman

== R ==
- Rawdat Al Madaris
- Ar-Rawi
- Rose al-Yūsuf

== S ==
- Sahifat Dar al-Ulum
- Al Siyassa Al Dawliya
- Al Siyassa Al Musawwara
- Al Siyasa Al Usbuiya
- As-Sufūr

== T ==
- Al Tali'a
- Al Tatawwur
- Al Thaqafa
- At-Tahdhib
- Tok Tok
- Türk

== U ==
- Al Ustadh

== W ==
- Weghat Nazar

== Z ==
- Zamalek SC magazine

== See also ==
- Media of Egypt
- List of newspapers in Egypt
- List of radio stations in Egypt
- Television in Egypt
