= Arev =

Arev or AREV may refer to:

== Publications ==
- Arev (daily), an Armenian newspaper in Cairo, Egypt
- Arev Monthly, a monthly in Arabic published by Arev in Cairo, Egypt

== Given name ==
- Arev Petrosyan (born 1972), Armenian artist
- Arev, god of the sun in Armenian mythology
- Arev, an alias of the fictional character Syrran in Star Trek: Enterprise

== Other uses ==
- Assembly of European Wine-producing Regions (Assemblée des Régions Européennes Viticoles in French)
- Atmospheric Reentry Experimental Vehicle, an ESA study to develop a re-entry vehicle
- Alternative Rouge et Verte, defunct far left French party
