= Wahid Al Naqqash =

Wahid al-Naqqash
- وحيد النقاش
- Born: May 6, 1937; Minayt Samanoud, Dakahlia, Dakahlia Governorate, Egypt
- Died: October 20, 1971 (aged 34); Paris, France
- Education: Cairo University
- Occupations: Writer, translator, literary critic, editor
- Relatives: Rajaa al-Naqqash (brother); Fikri al-Naqqash (brother); Farida al-Naqqash (sister)

Wahid al Naqqash (Arabic: وحيد النقاش; May 6, 1937 – October 20, 1971) was an Egyptian writer, translator, and literary figure.

== Early life and career ==
Wahid al Naqqash was born on May 6, 1937, in the village of Minayt Samanoud in the Aga district of Egypt's Dakahlia Governorate. He chose to study the French language at the Faculty of Arts at Cairo University, a notable decision at a time when French was often associated with the country's upper class.

After graduating, he worked for a brief period at the Center for Folk Arts. In 1962, he joined the Al-Ahram newspaper, where he worked as a literary editor in the cultural section under the supervision of Louis Awad.

In June 1976, al Naqqash traveled to Paris to pursue a doctorate. His dissertation topic was "The Evolution of Social Reality in Egypt Through the Art of Theatre". During his time in France, he remained a correspondent for Al-Ahram.

== Family ==
Al Naqqash belonged to a family of prominent intellectuals. His brother, Rajaa al Naqqash, was a translator and critic, and his brother, Fikri al Naqqash, was a playwright. His sister, Farida al Naqqash, served as the editor-in-chief of the literary magazine Adab wa Naqd for two decades. In late 2006, she became the editor-in-chief of Al-Ahali, the newspaper representing the leftist Tagammu Party.

== Writing career ==
After completing his secondary education, al Naqqash published his first literary study in the July 1954 issue of the Lebanese magazine Al-Adab, in which he analyzed ten world short stories. He went on to contribute to various literary, poetry, and theatre magazines.

His most significant platform was the Al-Ahram newspaper, where he published the majority of his articles. His work there spanned from his piece "Foreigners and Our Folk Heritage" on November 2, 1962, to "King Ionesco in the Academy's Cemetery" on April 9, 1971.

While living in Paris to pursue his doctoral studies, al Naqqash continued to serve as a correspondent, sending literary and theatrical articles and letters back to Al-Ahram. During this period, he focused his energy on completing his dissertation while simultaneously supplying Egyptian newspapers and magazines with important articles, translations, and studies.
