= Fatima Naoot =

Egyptian poet and translator

- فاطمة ناعوت
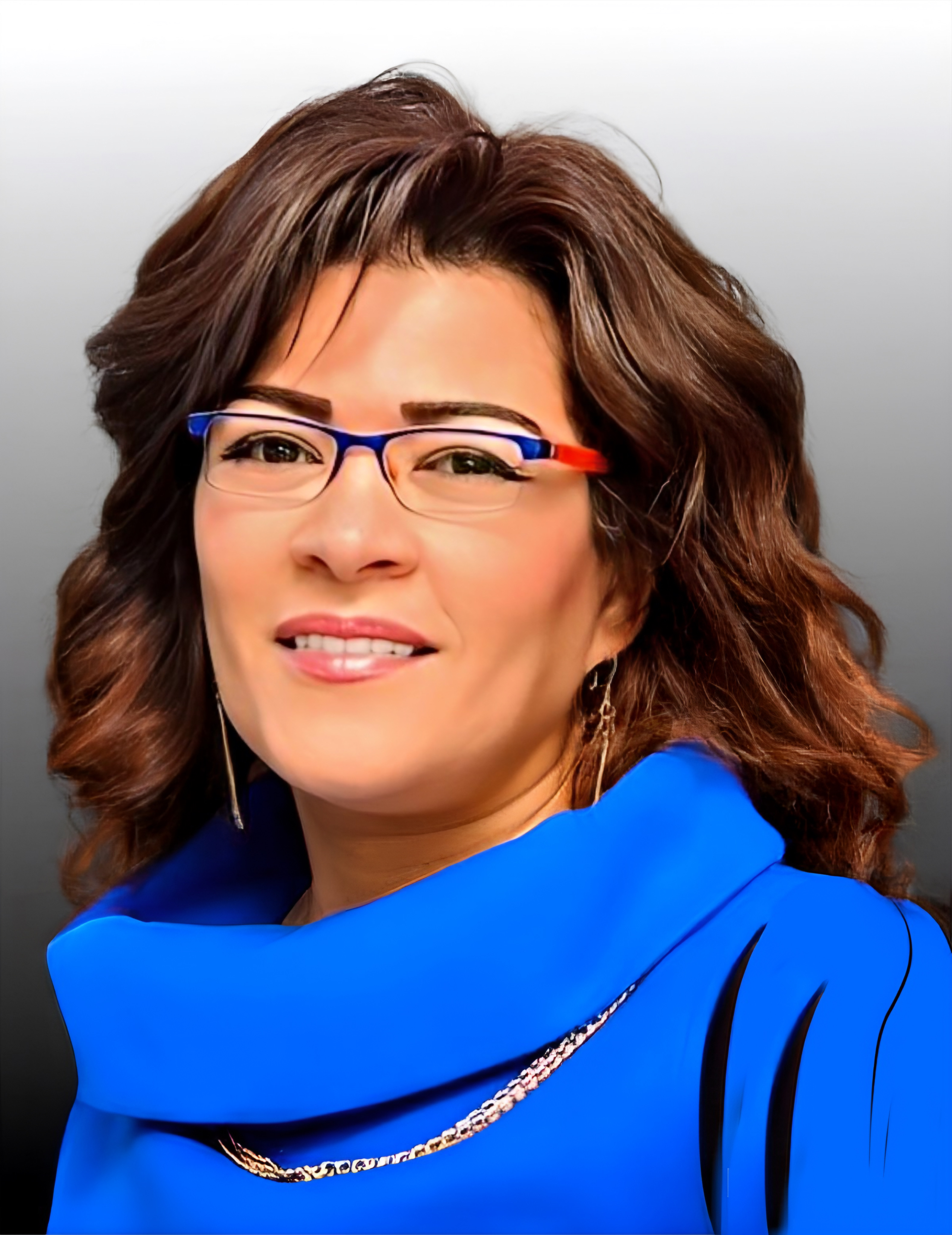
- Naoot in 2022
- Born: Fatima Hasan Naoot; 18 September 1964 (age 62); Cairo, Egypt
- Education: Ain Shams University
- Occupations: Poet, translator, architect, and journalist at AlMasry Alyoum newspaper
- Partner: Nabil Shehata
- Children: Mazen, Omar
- Writing career
- Language: Egyptian Arabic
- Genres: Poetry,Novel,Journalism, Thinking, Translation
- Notable work: A Bottle of Glue

Fatima Naoot (Egyptian Arabic: فاطمة ناعوت; born 18 September 1964) is an Egyptian poet, translator and journalist. She has written 40 books, including 10 collections of poetry, and a novel, and is the chief editor of the literary magazine Qaws Qazah (The Rainbow). She has translated many novels and anthologies from English into Arabic. She is also a columnist and has written articles for Nesf El Donya, Al-Masry Al-Youm, and Youm7.

Prior to her literary career, Naoot worked as an architect for 10 years as she was a graduate of Faculty of Engineering, Ain Shams University. In 2016, Naoot was sentenced to three years in prison for posting a message on Facebook critical of the ritual slaughter of sheep during the Islamic feast Eid al-Adha. On appeal, her sentence was reduced to six months.

== Early life and education ==
Fatima Sayyid Muhammad Hasan Naoot was born on 18 September 1964 in Cairo, Egypt. She earned a degree in architecture from the Faculty of Engineering of Ain Shams University in Cairo in 1987. Following her graduation, she worked as an architect for Sabbour Consultants for 10 years.

== Literary career ==
Naoot left her architecture career in the late 1990s and started writing poetry, translating, and working as a journalist. She is the chief editor of the literary magazine Qaws Qazah (The Rainbow) and writes articles and weekly columns for Egyptian and Arab magazines and newspapers, including Nesf El Donya, Al-Masry Al-Youm, Youm7, Al-Youm Al-Sabaa, and the UAE news website.

Naoot has written 18 books, including seven collections of poetry. She has also written essays and literary criticism and translated many novels and anthologies from English into Arabic. In the 2000s, Naoot wrote multiple volumes of poetry. Her fifth volume, A Bottle of Glue, won first prize for Arabic literature at the 2006 Hong Kong Literary Festival and was later translated into English and Chinese. She has also translated the short stories of Virginia Woolf and John Ravenscroft, works by Philip Roth, Chimamanda Ngozi Adichie, Chinua Achebe, and a volume of American and English poetry.

Naoot has attended numerous poetry festivals, including the Edinburgh International Book Festival, the Moutanabbi International Poetry Festival in Zurich, and in 2007, the Poetry International Festival in Rotterdam.

== Criticism of Eid al-Adha ==
In October 2014, Naoot posted a message to Facebook critical of the ritual slaughter of sheep for the Islamic feast Eid al-Adha ("Feast of Sacrifice"). She referenced the dream of Abraham, writing "Millions of innocent creatures will be driven to the most horrible massacre committed by humans for ten-and-a-half centuries. A massacre which is repeated every year because of the nightmare of a righteous man about his good son." Following her post, social media trended with outrage towards what was described as her blasphemy. A lawsuit was filed against her in December 2014 by three lawyers. Prosecutors took the case and she was charged with contempt of Islam, disturbing public peace, and spreading sectarian strife. In an article, she denied that her intention was to insult religion. The case was brought to trial in January 2015. In January 2016, Naoot was sentenced Naoot to three years imprisonment and given a EGP 20,000 fine. She appealed the ruling and, in November 2016, an appeals court reduced her sentence to a six-month suspended sentence.

Naoot was a candidate for the Egyptian parliament.

In 2023, Naoot appeared in television interviews alongside a Coptic Christian couple whose adopted child was taken away from them.

== Selected publications ==
Poetry

- Finger's Pat, 2001
- One Centimeter Away From the Ground, 2002
- A Longitudinal Section in the Memory, 2003
- Upon a Woman's Palm, 2004
- A Head Split with an Ax, 2005
- Pockets Weighed with Stones, 2005
- The Temple of Roses, 2007
- A Bottle of Glue, 2008

Translations

- A Head Split with an Ax, Egypt, 2004 (American and Britain collection of poetry translated into Arabic)
- Pockets Weighed with Stones, Egypt, 2005 (A book on Virginia Woolf including an Arabic translation of her 1920 novella An Unwritten Novel)
- Killing Rabbits (translated into Arabic), Egypt, 2005 (A collection of short stories by John Ravenscroft translated into Arabic)

Cultural criticism

- Writing with Chalk (Essays about subjects including language, translation, liberty, arts and architecture)

Anthology

- Hammurabi's Sorrows, Egypt, 2003
