= Ahmed Mekky (disambiguation) =

Ahmed Mekky is an Egyptian actor.

Ahmed Mekky or Ahmed Mekki may also refer to:

- Ahmed Mekky (CEO) (born 1971), Egyptian businessman
- Ahmed Mekki (politician) (born 1941), former minister of justice of Egypt
- Ahmed Hassan Mekky (born 1987), Egyptian footballer
