= Amani Farid =

Egyptian writer and political activist (1922–2005)

- أماني فريد
- Born: 1922; Cairo, Egypt
- Died: 2005 (aged 82–83)
- Occupations: Journalist; feminist; poet; political activist
- Spouse: Hassan Ramzi

Amani Farid (Arabic: أماني فريد, romanized: Amānī Farīd; 1922–2005) was an Egyptian journalist, feminist, poet, and political activist. Through her work in journalism and political activism, she participated in several demonstrations, most notably the 1954 hunger strike at the Journalists' Syndicate for women's access to political representation.

== Biography ==
Farid was born in the Sayyeda Zaynab neighborhood of Cairo in 1922 to a father who worked at the Ministry of Education. Her mother died shortly after her birth. Farid described her early childhood as one in which a love of learning was cultivated in her by her father. Farid composed a poem in praise of King Farouk and received a thank-you-letter in response to the poem. Farid learnt Arabic, English, and Turkish as a child and began he political activism whilst at high school, when she participated in several protests against the British occupation of Egypt.

She matriculated from high school in 1937, and graduated in 1940 from the Higher Institute for Education in Zamalek. Farid worked as a teacher at several schools while working as a journalist, and founded Bint al-Sharq in the 1950s.

Farid worked with various figures in 20th-century Egyptian literary and political history such Huda Sharaawi, whom she considered a mentor, and Doria Shafiq. She married Hassan Ramzi and, until her death in Cairo in 2005, and continued working as a journalist – a stipulation of her marriage.

== Selected works ==
- Thought and Soul (فكر وروح), poetry, Anglo-Egyptian Library, Cairo, n.d
- A Heart that Speaks (قلب يتحدث), poetry, n.p., Cairo, 1985
- Memories (ذكريات), memoir, n.p., 1952
- Sunset Tales (أقاصيص الغروب), short stories, n.p., n.d.
- Angels, Waves, and Men (ملائكة وأمواج ورجال), short stories, n.p., n.d.
- Whispers and Gestures (همسات ولفتات), articles/essays, Egyptian Renaissance Library, Cairo 1947/1948
- Around the World (حول العالم), travel literature, 2 volumes, n.p., n.d.
- An Egyptian Woman in America (مصرية في أمريكا), travel literature, Anglo-Egyptian Library, Cairo, 1997.
- The German Woman as I Knew Her (المرأة الألمانية كما عرفتها), travel literature, n.p, n.d.
- An Egyptian Woman in the Levant (مصرية في ربوع الشام), travel literature, n.p., n.d.
- Europe Between Seriousness and Play (أوربا بين الجد واللهو), travel literature, n.p., n.d.
- Egyptian Women and Parliament (المرأة المصرية والبرلمان), prose, Egyptian Renaissance Library, Cairo, 1947.
- Days and Memories (أيام وذكريات), prose, Anglo‑Egyptian Library, Cairo, 1999.
- ايام وذكريات / بقلم اماني فريد. [Ayyām wa-dhikrayāt / bi-qalam Amānī Farīd] (in Arabic). al-Qāhirah: Maktabat al-Anjlū al-Miṣrīyah. 1999. ISBN 977051733X. LCCN 00285973. OCLC 44042408.

== See also ==
- List of Egyptian writers
