= Jean-François Bazin =

French journalist and politician (1942–2020)

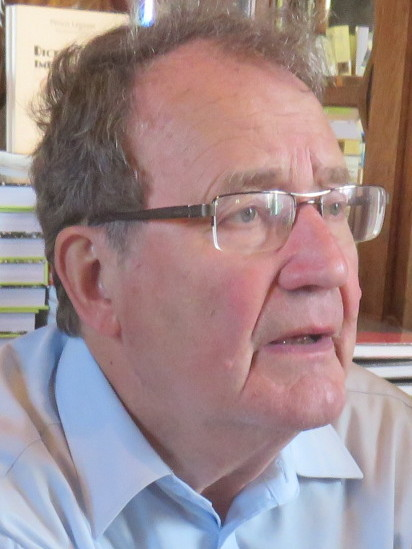
- Bazin in 2015

Municipal Councillor for Dijon
- In office 19 June 1995 – 25 March 2001
- Succeeded by: Alain Millot

Regional Councillor for Burgundy
- In office 1 April 1998 – 2 April 2004
- President: Jean-Pierre Soission
- Succeeded by: Christian Paul

President of the Regional Council of Burgundy
- In office 17 April 1993 – 1 April 1998
- Preceded by: Jean-Pierre Soisson
- Succeeded by: Jean-Pierre Soisson

Personal details
- Born: 26 July 1942 Dijon, France
- Died: 17 April 2020 (aged 77) Dijon, France
- Party: RPR
- Occupation: Politician; Journalist

Jean-François Bazin (French pronunciation: [ʒɑ̃ fʁɑ̃swa bazɛ̃]; 26 July 1942 – 17 April 2020) was a French politician, journalist, and writer.

== Biography ==
Bazin became a journalist in 1966 based in Dijon for the newspaper Les Dépêches. He served as editor-in-chief for the weekly La Lettre de Bourgogne from 1973 to 2003. He collaborated with Les Echos, Le Moniteur Universel, Le Nouvel Économiste, and Le Spectacle du Monde, in addition to the radio station France 3.

He worked for the University of Burgundy from 1968 to 1989. He was also an associate professor at the seminar of French professor at Stanford University from 1995 to 1999.

Bazin founded the Musée des arts et traditions des Hautes-Côtes in Reulle-Vergy, and served as curator from 1974 to 1992. He contributed to the creation of the SNCF TGV Sud-Est and the LGV Rhin-Rhône with the works Les Défis du TGV (1981) and Le TGV Atlantique (1988).

Holding a doctorate from the University of Burgundy and a master's and bachelor's from Sciences Po, Bazin was a member of the Regional Council of Burgundy from 1978 to 2004. He was a Municipal Councillor for Dijon from 1971 to 2008, Deputy Mayor of Dijon from 1995 to 2001, a member of the European Committee of the Regions from 1994 to 2002, Vice-President of the Assembly of European Wine-producing Regions from 1993 to 1998, and President of the Estates General of French Gastronomy from 1993 to 1996. He was a member of the Rally for the Republic.

=== Personal life ===
Bazin lived in Gevrey-Chambertin and Dijon. He married Irene de Vernisy in 1965, with whom he had three children. On 17 April 2020, Jean-François Bazin died in Dijon at the age of 77.

== Works ==
=== Biographies ===
- Le Chanoine Kir a-t-il existé ? (1969)
- Paul Masson - le Français qui mit en bouteilles l'or de la Californie (2002)
- Pour le meilleur et pour le kir, le roman d'un mot-culte (2002)
- Le Chanoine Kir : la vie fantasque d'un homme politique en soutane (2018)

=== Burgundy Culture ===
- La Bourgogne durant la IIème Guerre mondiale (1986)
- Histoire du vin de Bourgogne (2002)
- Le Tout Dijon (2003)
- Dictionnaire universel du Vin de Bourgogne (2010)
- Le Vin de Bourgogne (2013)
- L'Almanach bourguignon (2013)
- Le Crémant de Bourgogne (2015)

=== Novels ===
- La Bible de Chambertin (1959)
- L'Abbaye des effrayes (1977)
- L'Enfant du puits (2002)
- L'Affaire Josef-K (2007)
- Le Treizième Testament de Mme Winchester (2009)
- Les Raisins bleus (2010)
- Le Clos des Monts-Luisants (2011)
- Le Vin de Bonne-Espérance (2012)
- Les Compagnons du grand flot (2013)
- Le Maître de la Lumière (2018)

=== Other publications ===
- La Création du Ministère de la protection de la nature et de l'environnement - Essai sur l'adaptation de la structure gouvernementale à une mission nouvelle (1973)
- Les Défis du TGV (1981)
- Le Vin de Californie (1983)
- Les Affiches de Villemot (1985)
- Le TGV Atlantique (1988)

== Distinctions ==
- Knight of the Legion of Honour (1994)
- Knight of the Ordre des Arts et des Lettres
- Commander of the Order of Merit of the Republic of Poland
- Medaile Jana Amose Komenského
- Confrérie des Chevaliers du Tastevin Prize (1982)
- Prix Montesquieu at the Biennale Internationale des Livres du Vin (2014)
