= Khudair Abdul Amir =

Iraqi writer

- خضير عبد الأمير
- Born: 1934 (87-88 years old)
- Occupations: Author & Novelist
- Writing career
- Notable work: Rumuzun ʿAṣriya (Modern Symbols) (1977)

Khudair Abdul Amir (Arabic: خضير عبد الأمير) (born 1934) is an Iraqi writer and novelist. His novel Rumuzun ʿAṣriya (Modern Symbols) was chosen by the Arab Writers Union in the 20th century among the best 100 Arabic novels.

== About the author ==
Khudair Abdul Amir continued his secondary school studies in Baghdad. He published his first story in Al-Shaab newspaper in 1956. Also, he was employed in the department of imports, before moving to the ministry of communications. He also was a secretary for Al-Ṭaliʿa Magazine editorial from 1979 to 1984. He also was the magazine's editorial board director in 1984–1990. In 1993, he was a proofreader in the department of general cultural affairs in Al-Aqlam magazine. Finally, he is a member of the Author and Writers Union in Iraq.

== Works ==
=== Novels ===
- Laisa Thimmatu Amalin Li Gilgamesh (There is No Hope for Gilgamesh) (1971)
- Rumuzun ʿAṣriya (Modern Symbols) (1977)
- Hatha Aj-Janibu Minal Madina (The Side of The city) (1984)
- At-Ṭuruqul Muwḥesha (Savage Ways) (1999)
- Ḥob Wa Ḥarb (Love and War) (2000)

=== Other writings ===
- Ḥamamu Al-Saʿada (Pigeon of Happiness) (Short story collection), 1964
- Ar-Raḥil (The Leaving) (Short story collection), 1968
- ʿAwdatul Rajulil Mahzuz (Return of The Shaken Man) (Short story collection), 1970
- Kanat Hunaka Ḥikayatun (There Was A Tale) (Short story collection), 1974
- Khayma Lil ʿAam Ḥasan (Uncle Hasan's Tent) (Short story collection), 1974
- Al-Farrara (The Runaway) (Stories), 1979
- Al-Layla Al-Oula Fi Bayti Nasr (The First Night at Nasr's House) (Fictional narratives), 1988
- Nujumun Fi Samaa’il Nahar (Stars in The Morning Sky) (Stories), 1985
- ʿĀshiqāni Min Baghdad (Two Lovers From Baghdad) (Stories), 1987
- Al-Aswad Wal Abyad (Black and White) (Stories), 1990
- Aṣ-Ṣilṣal (The Clay) (Short story collection), 1996
- Al-Ashbaḥ (Ghosts) (Short story collection), 2001

== Prizes and awards ==
Arab Journalism Award from in the United Arab Emirates in 2015.
