= Jehane Ragai =

Egyptian chemist

- Born: Cairo, Egypt
- Spouse: John Meurig Thomas (m. 2010)
- Parent(s): Doria Shafik, Nour eldin Ragai
- Relatives: Ratiba Nassif, Ahmad Chafik (grandparents)

Academic background
- Education: American University in Cairo, Brunel University London

Academic work
- Discipline: Surface chemistry, archaeological chemistry
- Institutions: American University in Cairo

Jehane Noureldin Ragai (Arabic: جيهان نور الدين رجائي) (born in Cairo, Egypt) is an Emeritus Professor of Chemistry at the American University in Cairo (AUC). She is the author of the two editions of The Scientist and the Forger. The first edition, published in 2015 by Imperial College Press, was translated into Korean. The second edition, published in 2018 by World Scientific Publishing, was translated into Chinese. Her recent Textbook Technical Art History, published in 2021 by World Scientific Publishing, which she co-authored with Tamer Shoeib has won the "Most Promising New Textbook Award " by the Textbook and Academic Authors Association in the US.

== Early life and education ==
Jehane Ragai was born in Cairo, Egypt and is the daughter of Doria Shafik (1908–1975), the suffragette and leader of the Egyptian feminist movement from the mid 1940s to the mid 1950s and of the lawyer Nour eldin Ragai (1914–1980).

Ragai obtained the French Baccalaureate from the French Lycee in Cairo, a B.Sc. in Chemistry in 1966 (magna cum laude) and an M.Sc. in Solid State Science (1968) both from the American University in Cairo. In 1976 she received her doctoral degree from Brunel, the University of West London in the UK.

== Career ==
Ragai was a faculty member in the Chemistry Department of the American University in Cairo (AUC) from 1970 until her retirement as an Emeritus Professor in 2015.

Ragai's research interest is mainly in surface chemistry and her published work deals with the gas/solid and liquid/solid interfaces. She also has a keen interest in archaeological chemistry and has published several articles that deal with the interaction of the humanities and the science.

She has chaired the AUC University Senate (1998–2000), the AUC Chemistry Department (2000–2006) and was a principal investigator, leading the surface chemistry research group at the Youssef Jameel Science and Technology Research Center (STRC) at AUC. She was the director of the AUC Chemistry Graduate program (2010-Fall 2014). Ragai is the recipient of several AUC Trustees merit awards as well as the School of Sciences and Engineering award for her role as chair of the chemistry department. In 2013 she received the university-wide best teacher award.

Given her additional interest in archaeological chemistry she was a consultant to the American Research Center in Egypt (ARCE) Sphinx project, has served on the National Committee for the Study of the Sphinx, and for seven years (2001–2008) was member of the Board of Governors of the ARCE. As part of this project she studied the properties of ancient Egyptian mortars from the Sphinx and the Kephren Valley Temple.

Ragai was for several years (2008–2020) a member of the International Awards Jury in the Physical Sciences for the L'Oréal-UNESCO Awards for Women in Science founded by Nobel laureates Christian de Duve and Pierre Gilles de Gennes.

She was an invited lecturer at the following universities: Cambridge (UK), Cornell, Exeter, North Carolina at Raleigh, Princeton, Rutgers, Lund, Gothenburg, and Cardiff; also at the American Philosophical Society, the Mahmoud Khalil museum in Cairo, the American University in Paris, the Fitzwilliam Museum in Cambridge (UK), and the CNRS in Marseille. She has recently been elected as a foreign member of the Royal Swedish Academy of Arts and Sciences in Gothenburg.

== Family ==
She has two daughters from her marriage to Ali Tosson Islam (1945–1999). In April 2010, she married Sir John Meurig Thomas (1932–2020).
