= Algiers International Comics Festival =

Thematic festival organized in Algiers, Algeria

- Genre: Comics
- Locations: Algiers, Algeria
- Years active: 2008-present
- Website: Official website

The Algiers International Comics Festival (Festival International de la Bande Dessinée d’Alger, FIBDA) is a thematic festival organized in Algiers, Algeria, which was launched in 2008.

== History and profile ==
The FIBDA was established in Algiers, Algeria, in 2008. It takes place in October annually under the aegis of the Ministry of Culture. In 2011, French cartoonist Hervé Barulea became the president of the FIBDA.

The focus of the FIBDA is the comic book industry. It has annual themes - for instance, it was "Algiers, Balloons Bay" in 2009 and “Algiers, Bubbles Without Borders” in 2011. Artists from different countries in addition to local artists participate in the events organized under the FIBDA. Therefore, it is the major event in its category in pan Africa and Arab world with its huge number of international guests and its activities. In the festival several bodies and publications focusing on comics from Africa are awarded. One of the publications awarded is the Egyptian magazine Tok Tok.
