= Ahmed Mekky (CEO) =

Egyptian entrepreneur

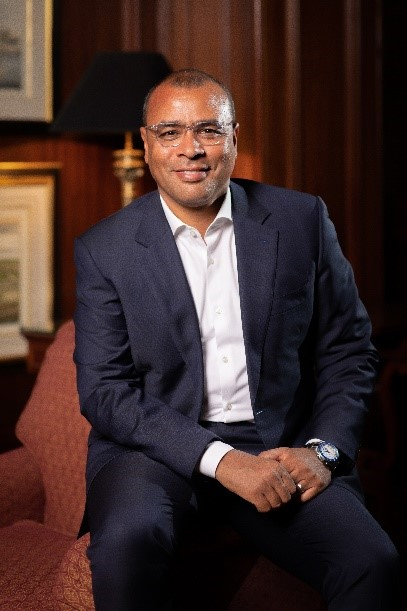
Ahmed Mekky Chairman and CEO "Benya" Group And President of Fiber Connect Council MENA

Ahmed Mekky (Arabic: أحمد مكي, (born in 1972), is an Egyptian entrepreneur, Chairman, and CEO of Benya Group, a digital solutions and ICT infrastructure provider in Egypt, Middle East and Africa regions.

== Early life and education ==
Ahmed Mekky was born on Thursday October 19th, 1972 in Egypt, He received a bachelor's degree in telecommunications engineering from Cairo University, He completed a pre-master's degree in computer engineering from Faculty of Engineering, Cairo University. After that, he joined the Information Technology Institute (ITI) and graduated from the University of Nottingham with a master's degree in information technology. He has 2 daughters.

== Career (GBI and Benya Group) ==
Mekky founded ‘Gulf Bridge International (GBI)- in 2008, to construct and operate a submarine cable network connecting 25 countries, from the Middle East, Africa, Europe and Asia, through Egypt. Based on Mekky’s plan, the project was later extended to 40,000 km following the support and request of the Gulf Cooperation Council (GCC).

Following the initiation of the company ‘Equinox’ in 2005, the company was rebranded to (Fiber Misr ICT) and eventually, Mekky founded the company to become Benya Group in 2017. Benya Group concentrates on verticals of information and communication technology. The Group, through its six subsidiaries, focusing on verticals of information and communication technology, three of these established subsidiaries and three incubated subsidiaries creating a diverse set of disciplines, provides a portfolio of advanced digital solutions across a set of industry segments, including smart cities, healthcare, education, and transportation.

== Appointments ==
In 2011, Mekky was chosen as a Group Chair of SAMENA's Telecoms Council, a group in South Asian and MENA telecoms services. One year later, he was selected for the Pacific Telecommunications Council (PTC) Board of Governors, making him the first Middle Eastern leader to hold this post.

In 2013, he was a member of the NTRA's Industry Committee, a Board Member of the Information Technology Industry Development Agency (ITIDA). Mekky also took over the membership of the Industry Committee of the Telecommunications Regulatory Agency “NTRA”, in addition to membership in the Board of Directors of the Information Technology Industry Authority “ITIDA”, from 2013 to 2016.

Meanwhile, he was a member of the Egyptian Kuwaiti Cooperation Council in 2015, which was involved in increasing Egypt-Kuwait economic cooperation. In 2021, Mekky became a board Member of Science and Technology Parks for Electronics and Research Industries in 2022 and was the first Egyptian to be appointed to the president of the Fiber Connect Council MENA.

== Honors and awards ==
- October 2012 - Global Telecoms Business listed Mekky among ‘Global Telecoms Business Power 100 list’ (4)(5)
- 2014 – Mekky received the ITP Group Award for ‘Industry CEO of the year’ in the telecommunications sector in the Middle East (6)
- January 2021 – Telecom Review honored Mekky with the award “MERIT Leader Award” (8)(9)(10)
- March 2021 –Mekky awarded the "Excellence Award in Digital Transformation” award from Business Today Magazine (BT100 Awards ) (11)(12)
- November 2021 - “Fakhr Al Arab 2021” award for his contributions to the advancement of the industry in the region.
