= Arek Monthly =

Arek Monthly أريك
- Type: Monthly magazine
- Editor: Mohammed Refaat el Immam
- Founded: 2010; 15 years ago
- Language: Arabic
- Headquarters: Cairo, Egypt
- Website: None

Arek Monthly (أريك in Arabic meaning sun in Armenian) is a monthly magazine published in Cairo, Egypt by Armenian General Benevolent Union (AGBU) in Arabic covering Armenian subjects and concentrating on Arab-Armenian relations.

The first issue of Arek was in April 2010, one year after the suspension of publication of Arev Monthly in April 2009. The editor-in-chief was Mohammed Refaat el Immam.

== See also ==
- List of magazines in Egypt
