= Egypt Today =

Egyptian English language monthly magazine

- Editor in Chief: Mohamed Abd El-Baky
- Photographer: Mohsen Allam (editor)
- Categories: News magazine
- Frequency: Monthly
- Circulation: 14,500 (2013)
- Publisher: United Media Services (UMS)
- Founder: William Harrison
- Founded: 1979; 47 years ago
- Company: Egyptian Media Group
- Country: Egypt
- Based in: Cairo
- Language: English
- Website: Egypt Today
- OCLC: 30789988

Egypt Today is an Egyptian English-language monthly news magazine owned by United Media Services (UMS), a company owned by the Egyptian General Intelligence Service (Mukhabarat).

== History and profile ==
Egypt Today was first published in 1979. It covers Egyptian current affairs and some international news. The magazine is published by IBA media, which also publishes Business Today Egypt, another monthly magazine. Both magazines are based in Cairo.

In March 2005, the magazine was banned in the country due to its article on the 2005 presidential election. The 2013 circulation of the magazine was about 14,500 copies.

== See also ==
- List of magazines in Egypt
