= Tok Tok =

Comic magazine in Egypt (2011–2020)

- Categories: Comic magazine
- Frequency: Quarterly
- Founded: 2011
- First issue: 10 January 2011
- Final issue Number: October 2020; 16
- Country: Egypt
- Based in: Cairo
- Language: Arabic
- Website: Tok Tok

Tok Tok was a quarterly Arabic comic magazine published in Cairo, Egypt. It was the first independent self-published comic magazine in the country and was in circulation between 10 January 2011 and 2020.

== History and profile ==
Tok Tok was first published on 10 January 2011. The founders of the magazine were five Egyptian graphic artists, namely Shennawy, Makhlouf, Hisham Rahma, Andil, and Tawfeek. They were also contributors of the magazine which funded itself. However, later the magazine was financially supported by the European Union. The goal of the magazine was to offer a forum for Egypt's comic scene and for informing people about their predecessors using comics and graphics.

The title of the magazine, Tok Tok, is a three-wheeled covered scooter used as a main method of motorized transportation in areas and roads in Egyptian cities where cars cannot be used. The magazine’s tagline was “the stop for graphic stories” and the cover page also contains the statement, “to be kept out of the reach of children”.

The target audience of Tok Tok were adults. Based in Cairo, the magazine contained graphic short stories and satirical comics. The stories published were mostly about love, joblessness, the attitudes of the elders and the authorities or the chaos of Cairo. The characters featured in the magazine were from the local heritage and experiences.

Tok Tok was supported by various European cultural institutes during its lifetime. In 2011, the magazine won the second prize in the best independent comic magazine section at the Algiers International Comics Festival in Algeria (FIBDA). The last issue of Tok Tok, #16, was published in October 2020.

== See also ==
- List of magazines in Egypt
- Tuktuk
