= Asma Tubi =

Palestinian writer (1905–1983)

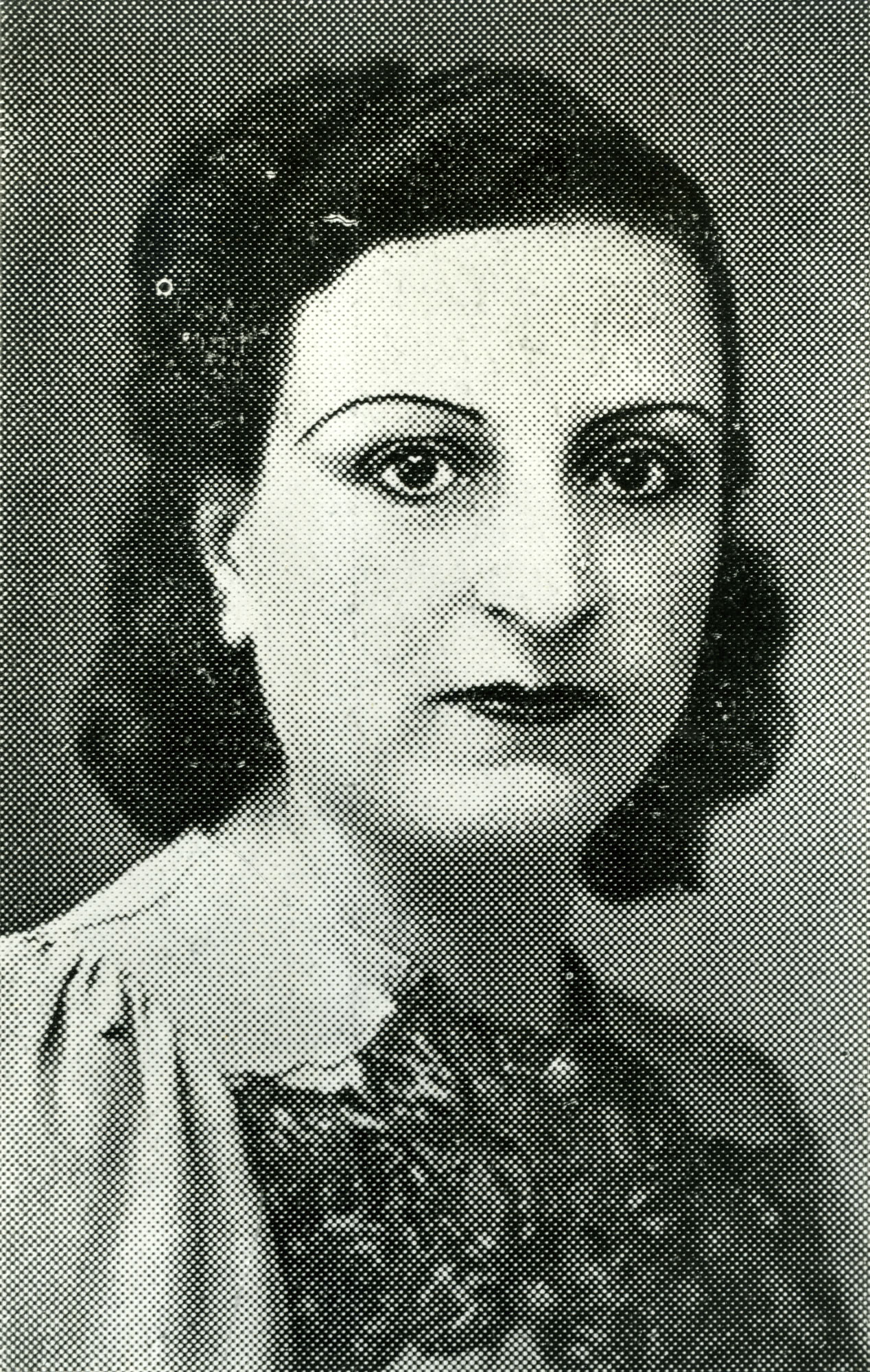
Asma Tubi

Asma Rizq Tubi (1905–1983) was a Palestinian poet and writer.

== Early life and education ==
She was born into a Palestinian Christian family in Nazareth and was educated at the English school there. She studied Greek and then the Quran, to improve her writing skills in Arabic.

== Career ==
Tubi moved to Acre after being married. She was a founding member of the Women's Union there. She was also a member of the YWCA and the Young Orthodox Women's Association and served as president of the Arab Women's Union. Tubi appeared on local radio stations, including Huna al-Quds ("Jerusalem here") and Sharq Al-Adna ("Near East") in Jaffa. She also appeared on a radio show in Beirut in 1948. She was editor of the women's page for the newspaper Falastin and for the magazines Al Ahad and Kull shay' magazine.

She published poetry, plays and fiction, including a number of works in English. At age 20 in 1925, Tubi wrote her first play, The Execution of the Russian Tsar and His Family. When she was forced to leave Palestine in 1948, she left behind a book manuscript called The Arab Palestinian Woman. In 1955, she published a collection of stories titled: Aḥādīth min al-qalb (“Stories from the heart"). Tubi was considered one of few the Palestinian women writing before 1948, but it was not until after 1948 that Palestinian women's fiction was consolidated artistically.

Amid her writing, Tubi was also an engaged activist. In 1937, amid the Arab Revolt, and in response to further attempts to partition Palestinian land to the British and Zionist settlers, Tubi organized and led protests against those colonizing forces.

In the 1960s, Tubi gathered and recorded oral histories from Palestinian women across the diaspora, which would appear in her 1966 Abir wa majd. For this work, she is sometimes recognized as the first Arab woman to document oral histories.

== Death ==
Tubi died in Beirut in 1983.

== Awards ==
She was awarded the Lebanese Constantine the Great Award in 1973 and the Jerusalem Medal for Culture and Arts (posthumously) in 1990.

== Selected works ==
- The Execution of the Russian Tsar and His Family (1925)
- The Young Girl and How I Would Like Her to Be (1943)
- On the Altar of Sacrifice (1946)
- Conversations from the Heart (1955)
- Fragrance and Glory (1966)
- My Great Love (1972)
- Wafts of Fragrance (1975)
