= Arab Observer =

The Arab Observer was an English-language weekly news magazine published in Cairo, Egypt, between 1960 and 1966.

== History and profile ==
The Arab Observer was founded by Zain Nagati in 1960. At the time, it was one of the only English-language publications from the Middle East. Although not officially a state organ, it generally followed the political orthodoxy of the time and supported the Nasser's government.

Its most famous contributor was Maya Angelou, who worked as an editor while she was in Cairo. Mahmoud Amr is the former editor-in-chief of the magazine.

== See also ==
- List of magazines in Egypt
