= Fekry Al-Naqqash =

- فكري النقاش
- Born: June 3, 1945; Menyet Samanoud, Aga Center, Dakahlia Governorate, Egypt
- Died: November 3, 2016 (aged 71); Cairo, Egypt
- Occupations: Writer, theater critic
- Relatives: Rajāʼ Naqqāsh (brother), Waheed El-Nakash (brother), Farida El-Nakash (sister), Amina El-Nakash (sister)

Fekry Al-Naqqash (Arabic: فكري النقاش; June 3, 1945 - November 3, 2016) was an Egyptian writer and theater critic.

== Life ==
Fikry Abdel-Momen El-Nakash was born on June 3, 1945, in the village of Menyet Samanoud, Aga Center, Dakahlia Governorate. He was born into a prominent literary and artistic family. His father was the poet Abdel-Momen El-Nakash, and his siblings included the late journalist and critic Rajāʼ Naqqāsh, the late journalist, translator, and short story writer Waheed El-Nakash, and journalists Farida El-Nakash and Amina El-Nakash. El-Nakash died in a Cairo hospital.
