= Business Today Egypt =

Business magazine in Cairo, Egypt

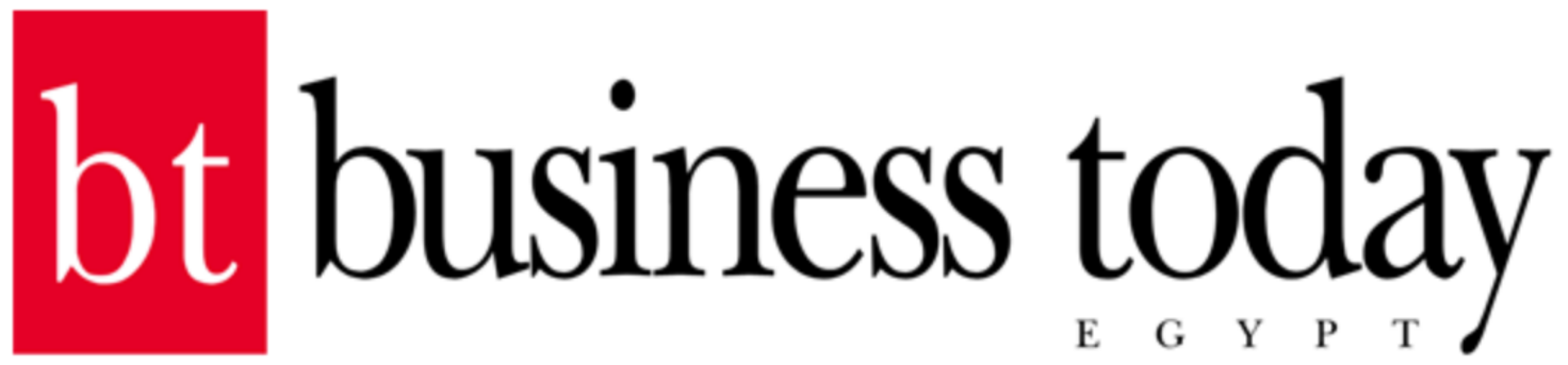
- Categories: Business magazine
- Frequency: Monthly
- Publisher: Egyptian Media Group
- Founded: 1995; 31 years ago
- Company: Egyptian Media Group
- Country: Egypt
- Based in: Cairo
- Language: English
- Website: www.businesstodayegypt.com

Business Today Egypt (also known as BT) is an English business magazine which is published monthly in Cairo, Egypt by Egyptian Media Group. It is the only independent business magazine in the country. The magazine models Fortune and Business Week magazines.

== History and profile ==
BT was launched in 1995. It is being published by IBA Media which also publishes Egypt Today magazine. The magazine is based in Cairo.

The magazine provides political, economical and business news. It publishes annual BT 100 rankings of companies. Each month BT offers special supplements, for instance, in January digital boom, in April real estate and in October technology.

In 2013 BT sold nearly 12,000 copies.

== Incidents ==
In October 2013 deputy managing editor Campbell MacDiarmid was arrested while covering the Islamist protests in Egypt. He was released after being detained for several hours, and said police told him to delete photographs he had taken of the protests.

== See also ==
- List of magazines in Egypt
