= Nesf El Donya =

Arabic-language weekly women's magazine published in Egypt

Nesf El Dunia
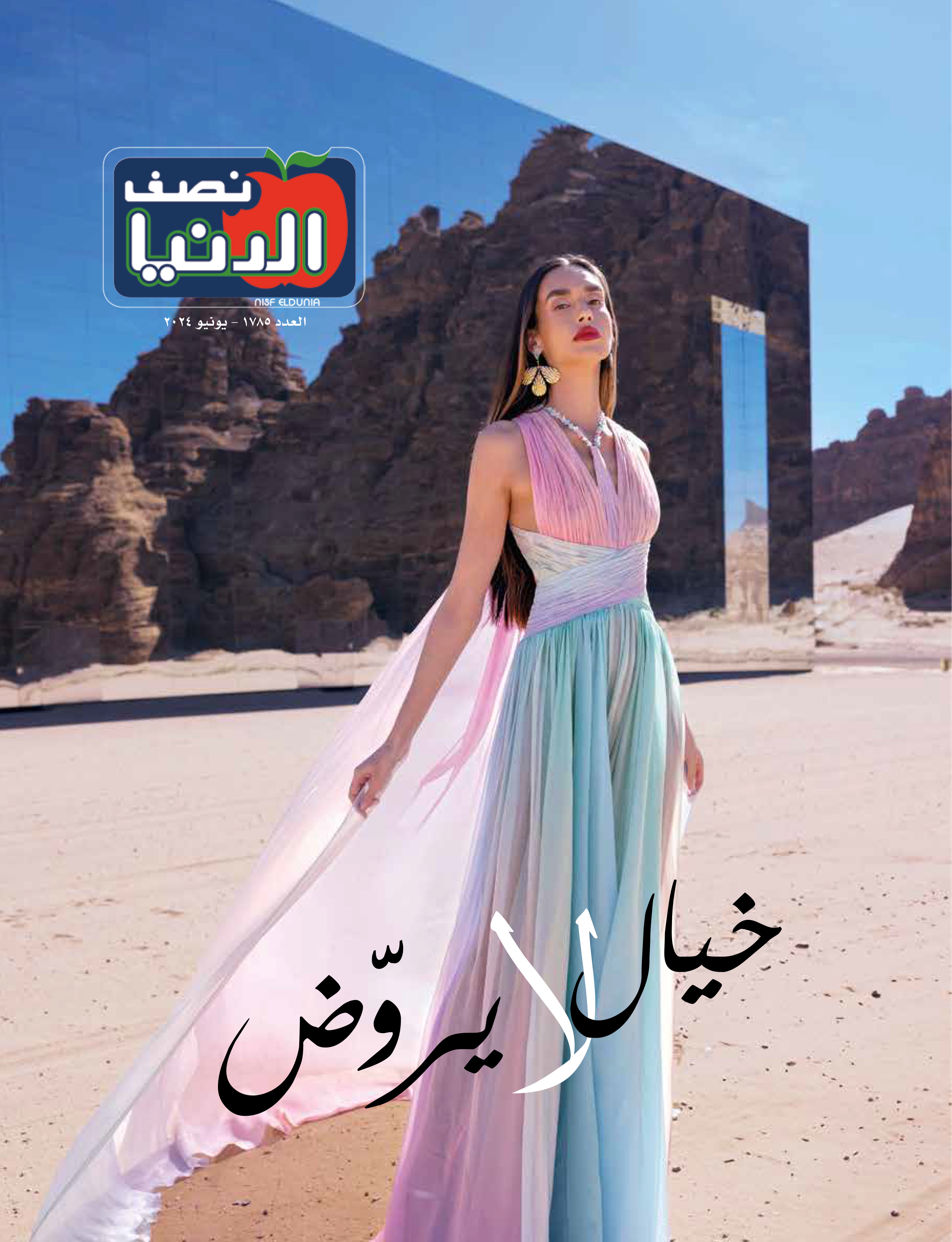
- Nesf El Dunia Cover
- Editor-in-Chief: Sawsan Mourad Ezzelarab
- Categories: Women's magazine Political magazine
- Frequency: Monthly
- Publisher: Al Ahram
- Founded: 1989; 36 years ago
- First issue: 1989; 36 years ago
- Company: Al Ahram Publishing Group
- Country: Egypt
- Based in: Cairo
- Language: Arabic
- Website: https://nisfeldunia.ahram.org.eg/Index.aspx

Nesf El Dunia (Arabic: نصف الدنيا, lit. 'Half of the World'), also known as Nisf El Dunia, is a monthly women's and political magazine. It was published in Cairo, Egypt, and has been in circulation since 1989.

== History and profile ==
Nesf El Dunia was first published in 1989. It is published by Al Ahram publication group, and its editors-in-chief are appointed by the Supreme Press Council which is a state-run body. The weekly is based in Cairo.

The magazine targets the working Egyptian women. It offers political news, and covers also articles about legal, religious, social affairs, focusing on their relation to women. The magazine includes a special section on female genital mutilation which features articles about its negative aspects. In addition, the weekly publishes interviews with significant female figures one of which was with Naglaa Ali Mahmoud, wife of Egypt's former President Mohamed Morsi.

Afkar El Kharadly and Ali Al Sayed are former editors-in-chief of the weekly. In June 2014, Amal Fawzi was appointed to the post. In September 2020 Marwa Mamdouh Anis Al Tobji was named as the editor-in-chief of the magazine. In April 2024, the magazine "Nifs El Dunia" was merged with "El Beit Magazine," transforming it into a monthly publication. Sawsan Mourad Ezzelarab took over as the editor-in-chief.

The circulation of Nesf El Dunia in 2000 was 350,000 copies.

== See also ==
- List of magazines in Egypt
