= Arev Petrosyan =

Armenian artist

Arev Petrosyan Արև Պետրոսյան
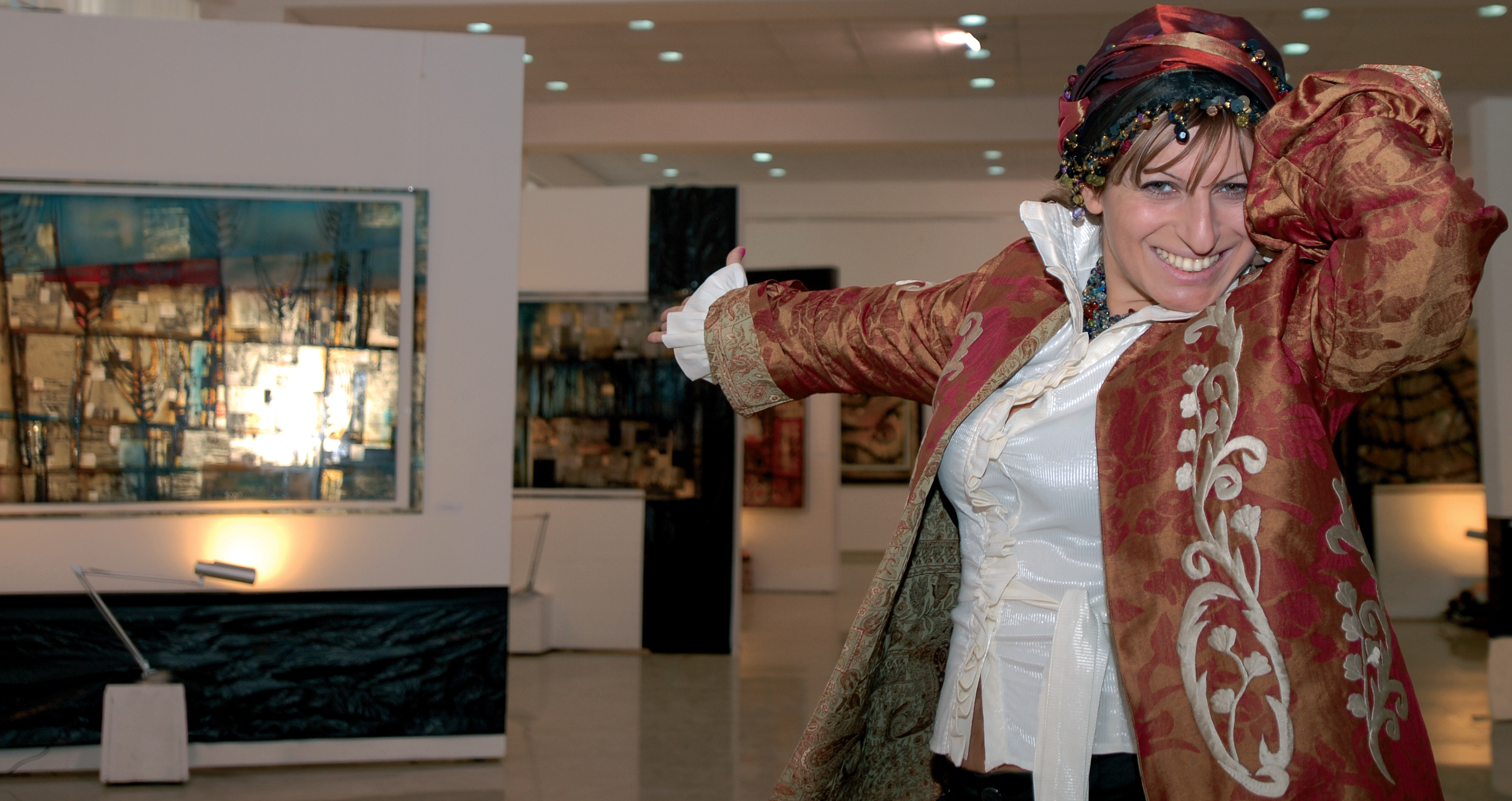
- Born: Arevik Petrosyan; May 6, 1972 (age 54); Yerevan, Armenia
- Known for: Painter, professor

Arev Petrosyan (Armenian: Արև Պետրոսյան; born May 6, 1972, in Yerevan), is an Armenian artist, awarded the title of Honored Artist of the Republic of Armenia in 2015.

== Biography ==
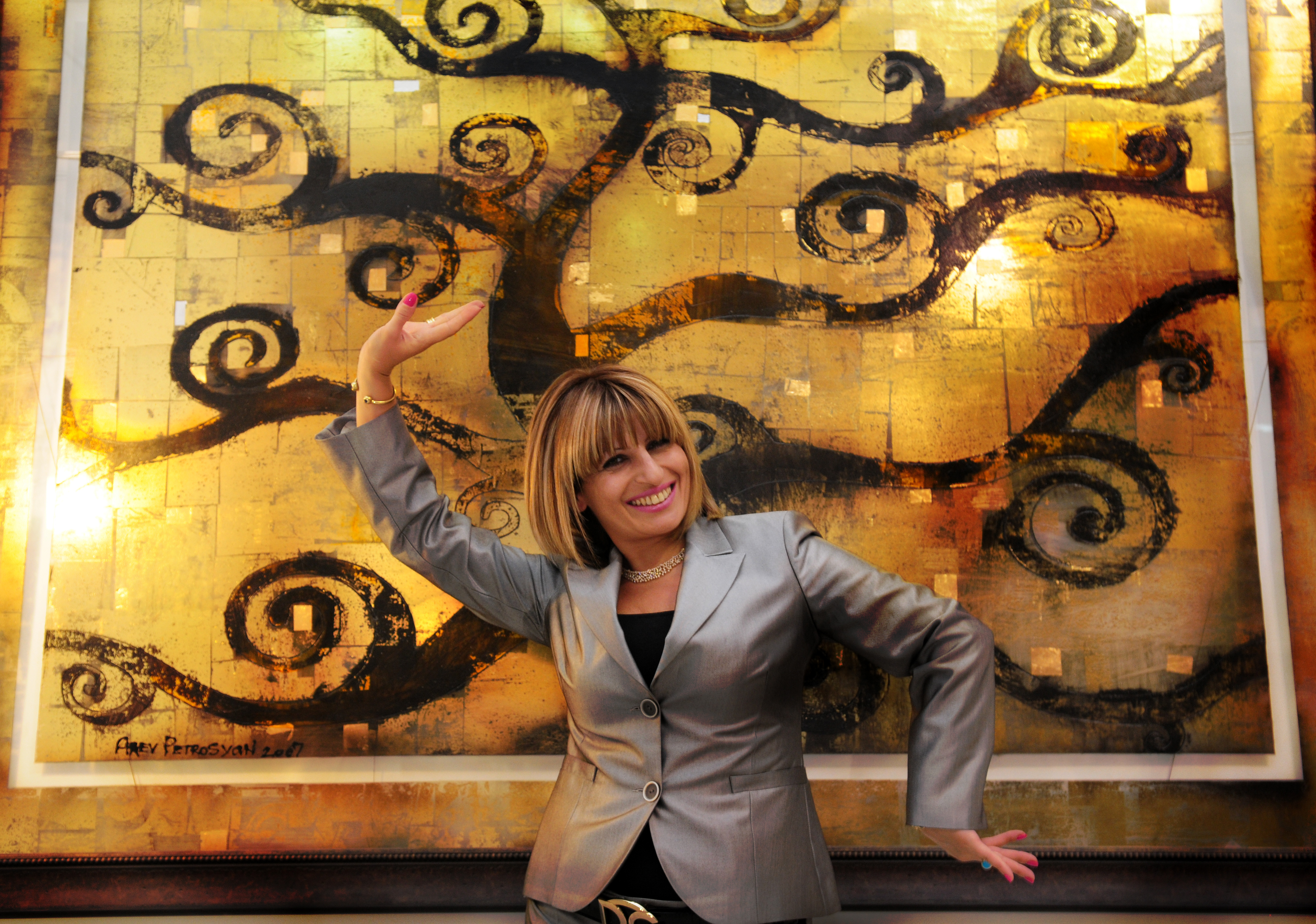

Arevik Petrosyan was born on May 6, 1972, in Yerevan, Armenia, in the family of the sculptor Benik Petrosyan and violinist and pedagogue Alice Adamyan.

Between 1987 and 1991 Arev studied at Panos Terlemezyan College of Fine Arts in the faculty of design. From 1991 to 1995 she studied Computer Graphics and Management and administration, and in 1991-1998 she was enrolled in the Yerevan State Academy of Arts (faculty of ceramics, art).

In 1999 Arev became a member of the Artists' Union of Armenia. In 2014 she donated her artwork "LOVE" to the AIWA organization in San Francisco.

In 2013, Arev was included in the "Women in Art" volume 1 series of book From Middle Ages to the Modern Art Era. In 2014 Arev Petrosyan's 8,40 x 2,40 meters art work was presented and donated to Holy Trinity Church in Fresno for 100 Year Anniversary of the first Armenian church in the United States. In 2015 Arev opened the AREV ART GALLERY in the center of Yerevan. That same year she was awarded the title of Honored Artist of the Republic of Armenia.

Between 1995 and 2007, Arev has designed number of television studios upon order of the Armenian National Television Company as well as other agencies and television companies such as Kaym, Paradise, Yerkir Media, Sharm, Shant, Shoghakat, Internews, A1+ and AR. She designed the information pavilions of the Government of Armenia, Ministry of Jurisdiction, and the City FM radio station. She also worked with famous companies such as iCon Communication, Schwarzkopf and Coca-Cola. She contributed to the aesthetic design of the television movie “New Year”, and she was the art director in the film “Path” (co-production between the United States and Armenia, directed by Ruben Qochar). She has done stage design for concerts, staging, interior and exterior design of cottages, offices, restaurants and apartments.

She is a Member of the Artists’ Union of the Republic of Armenia. She is also the CEO of the “Benik Petrosyan” cultural fund since 1997.

She is also the founder of Noosh Arevi, an Armenian brand of clothing specialised in bags, scarfs and assessors, home decoration and furniture production based on national heritage.

Between 2007 and 2017 she donated artworks for the Orran charity organization.

== Arev Art Gallery ==
In 2015 she opened the Arev Art Gallery in the center of Yerevan. Along with Arev's work, on display are her brother Areg Petrosyan's sculptures, as well as her late father Benik Petrosyan's works.

== Exhibitions ==
- Exhibition at American University of Armenia (AUA) within "Empowerment of Girls and Women in Armenia" conference, 2017
- Exhibition at German Embassy in Armenia dedicated to women, 2017
- “Armenian culture week” in Tokyo, 2016
- “Women's role in sustainable development” in Paris in UNESCO house, 2016
- Arev Petrosyan for American University of Armenia (AUA), 2015
- Beirut Art Fair 2014. GALA ART GALLERY's booth, 2014
- Monaco Art Fair 2014 SHEDEVR Art GALLERY's booth, 2014
- Holy Trinity Armenian Church in Fresno, Exhibition and donation of two paintings to the church, 2013
- Council of Europe, Strasbourg - stained glass picture “Power of Unity” which was put on display at the Assembly Hall, 2013
- Exhibition of triptych “Power of Unity” at the hall of the Ministerial Committee, 2013
- Exhibition in Belarus, Armenian days in Minsk, 2013
- Exhibition of triptych in National Gallery of Armenia “BOOK 500”, 2012
- “Woman in Art” exhibition in Artists' Union of Armenia, 2012
- Woman Business Forum, 2012
- Exhibition in Beirut, 2012
- Exhibition in Armenian Consulate, Los Angeles, US, 2012
- Project “Genocide 100”. Pray (AXOTQ), 2011
- Opening of “Arev Art Show Room” in Moscow, 2011
- “Colors from Armenia”, Beirut, 2011
- Exhibition at the National Assembly of the Republic of Armenia, Yerevan, 2010
- Armenian days in Georgia, Tbilisi, 2010
- American University of Armenia (AUA), 2010
- Exhibition in American Embassy, Yerevan, 2010
- Exhibition & Presentation of Catalogue and DVD “Reflection and Looking, 2009
- “My golden city” dedicated to the 2790th anniversary of Yerevan, Artists' Union of Armenia, 2008
- “Dedication” to the memory of Arev Petrosyan's father sculptor Benik Petrosyan, National Gallery of Armenia (family exhibition)Yerevan, 2008
- The Third Beijing International Art Biennale, China, 2008
- 75th Anniversary of the Union of Painters of Armenia, Artists' Union of Armenia, Yerevan, 2008
- III forum of artistic and scientific clerisy of CIS countries, Tajikistan, Dushanbe, 2008
- “March 8th - International Women's day” by the patronage of the First Lady of the Republic of Armenia, Yerevan, 2007
- Exhibitions National Assembly of the Republic of Armenia, Yerevan, 2006
- “Woman Painters of Armenia”, Hamazgayin, Yerevan, 2006
- “Women's Art” The Ministry of Foreign Affairs of the Republic of Armenia, 2005
- AOKS, Yerevan, Armenia, 2005
- “My Flowers to the Martyrs” dedicated to the 90th anniversary of the Armenian, 2005
- “Women for peace” UNIFEM, Yerevan (was awarded a prize), 2002
- United Nations office, Yerevan, 2001
- UNESCO student camps, Yerevan, 1999
- Number of exhibitions in the Republic of Armenian, also foreign exhibitions, 1991-1995

== Gallery ==
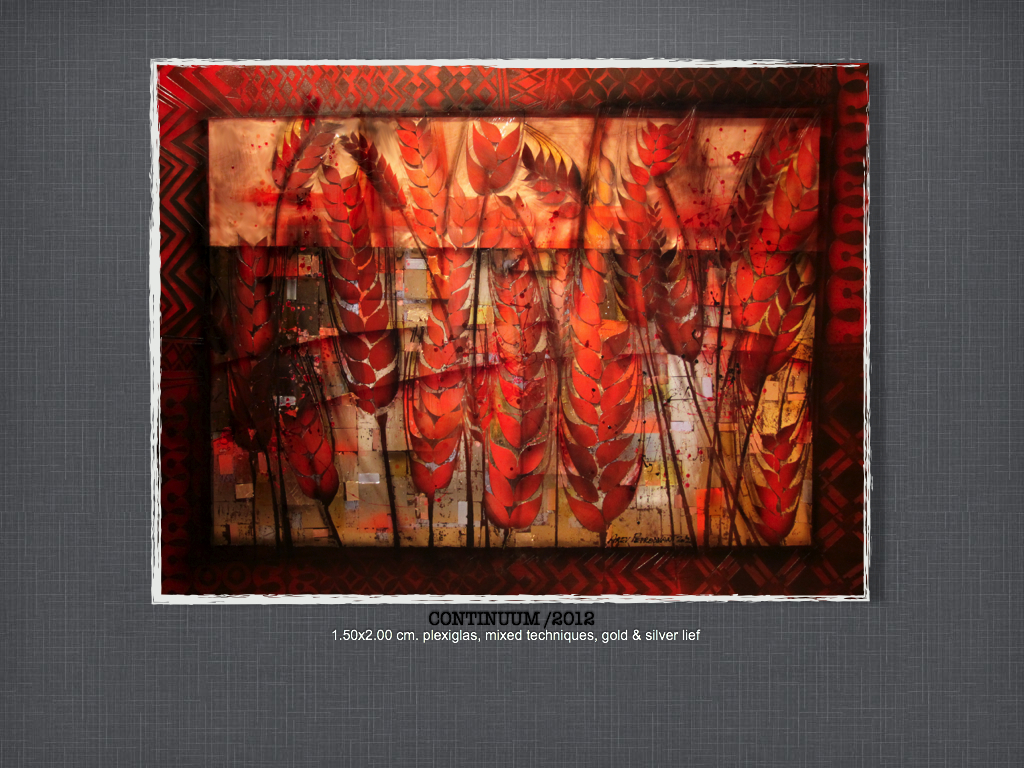

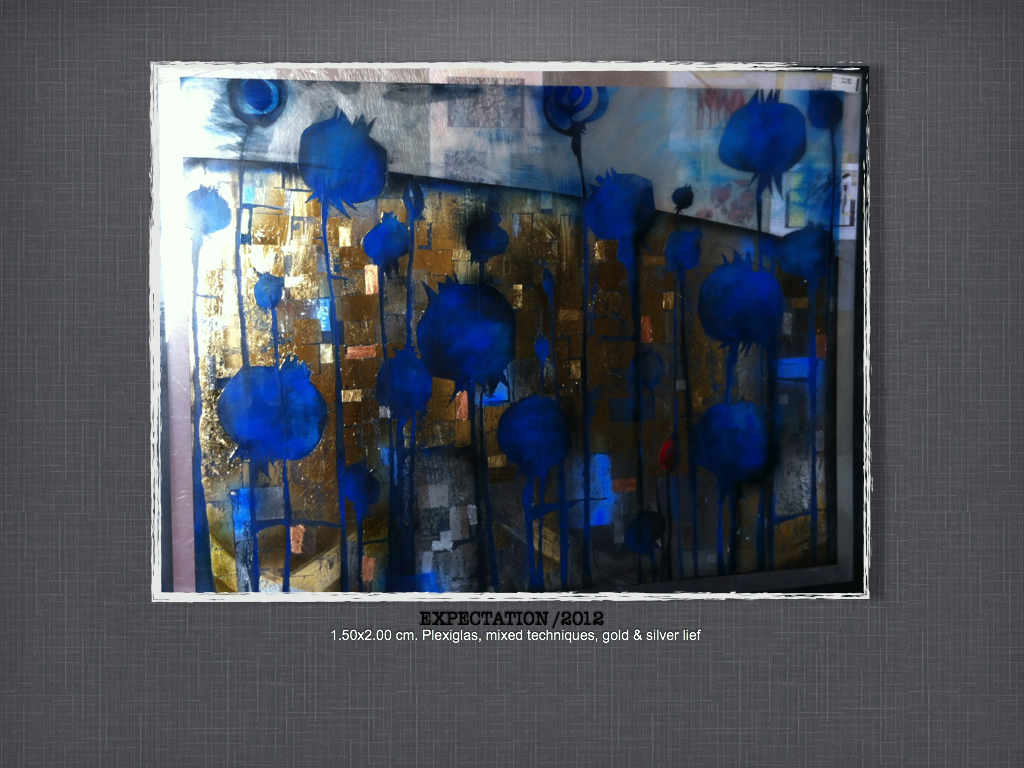

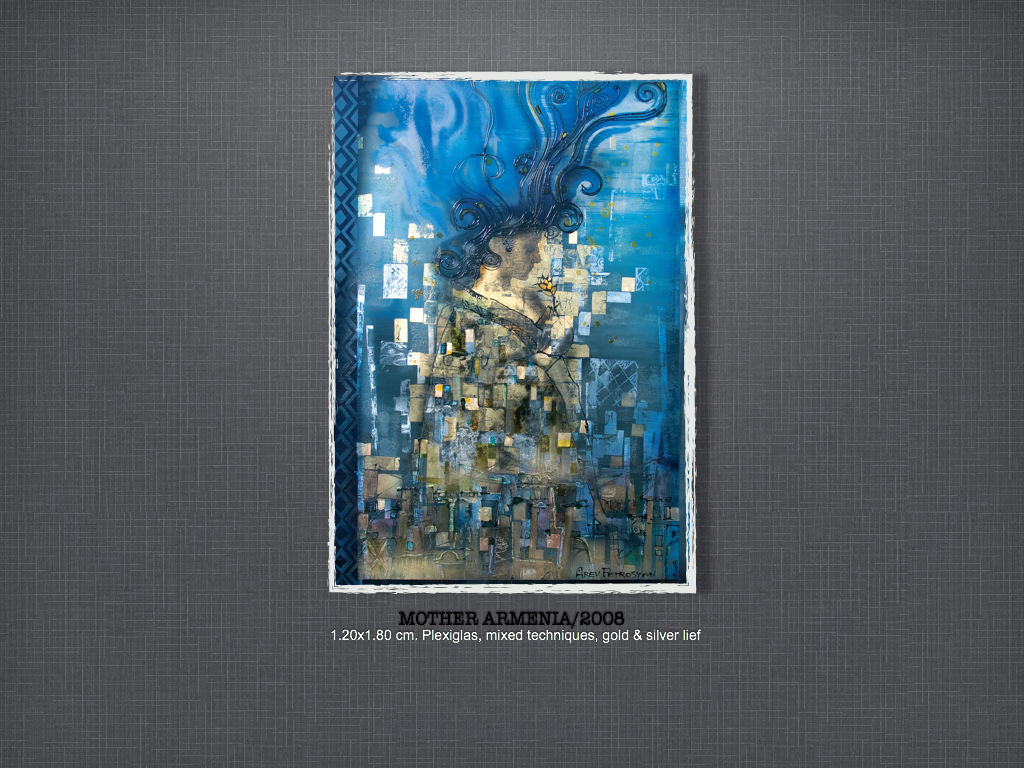

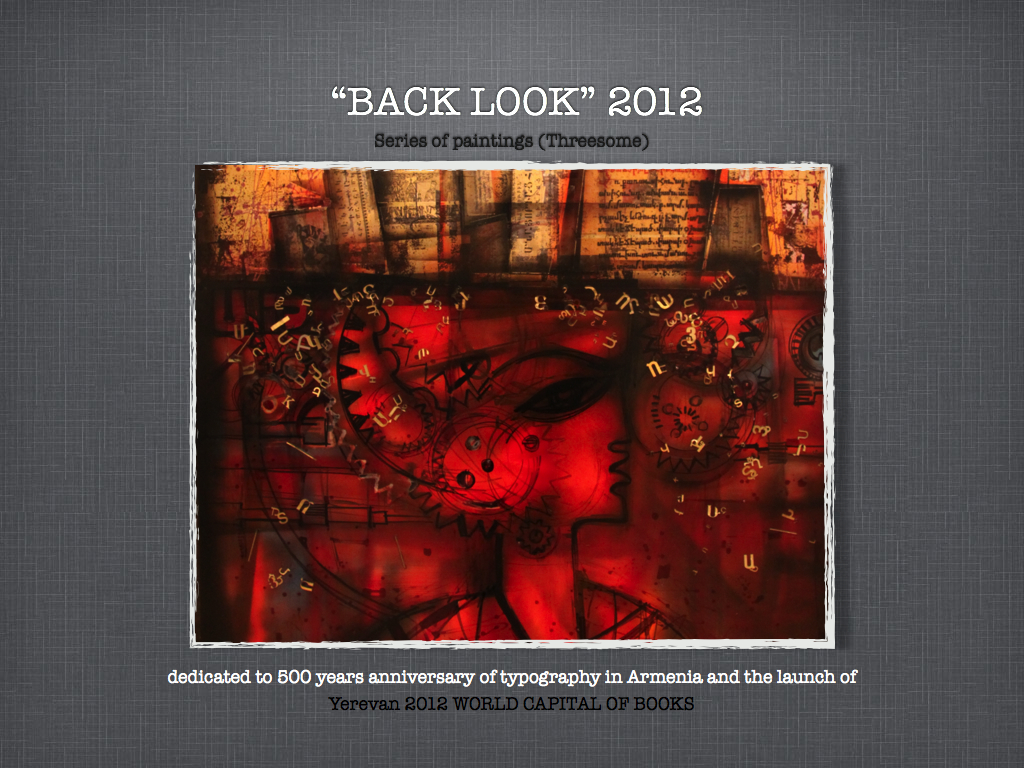

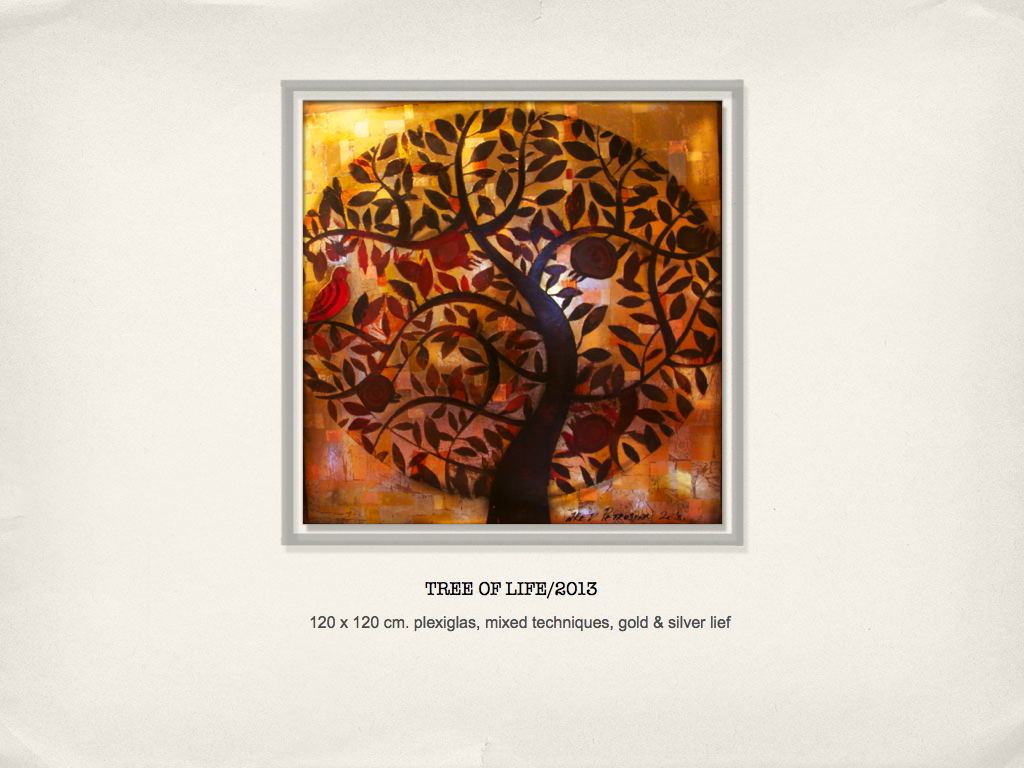

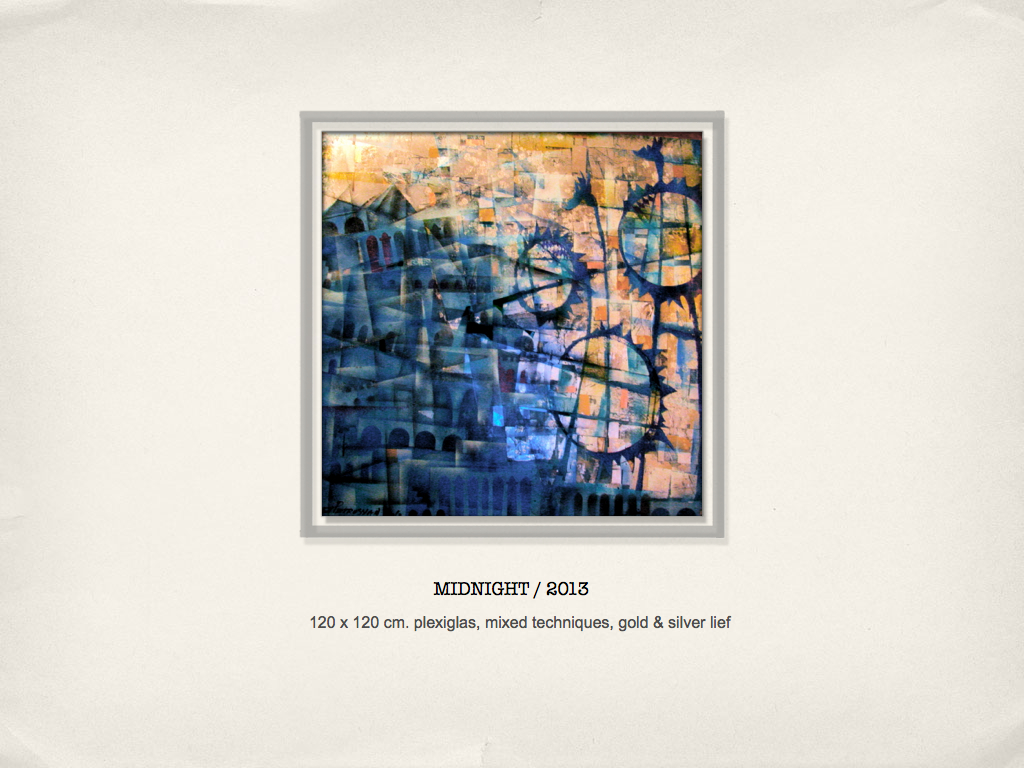

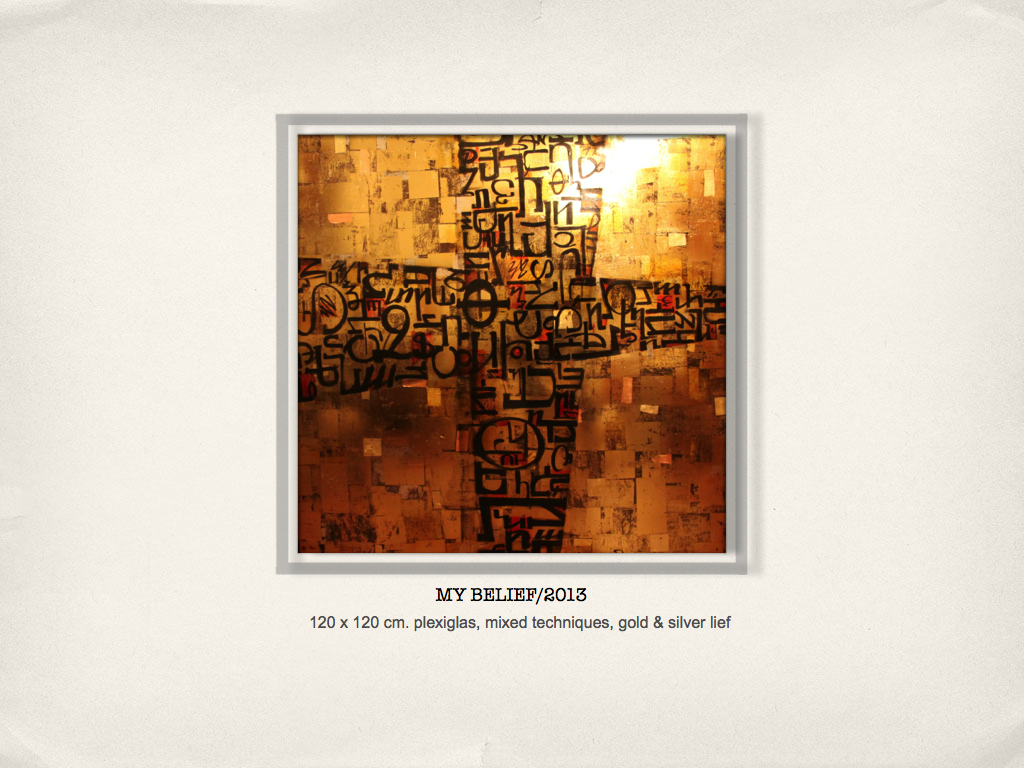

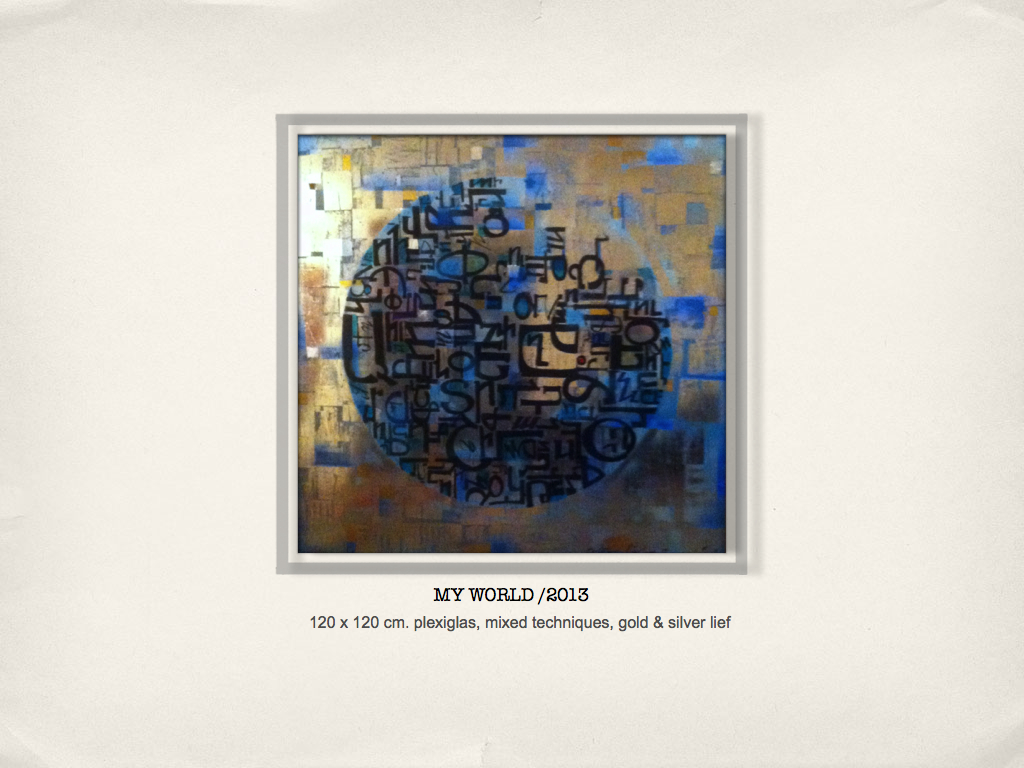

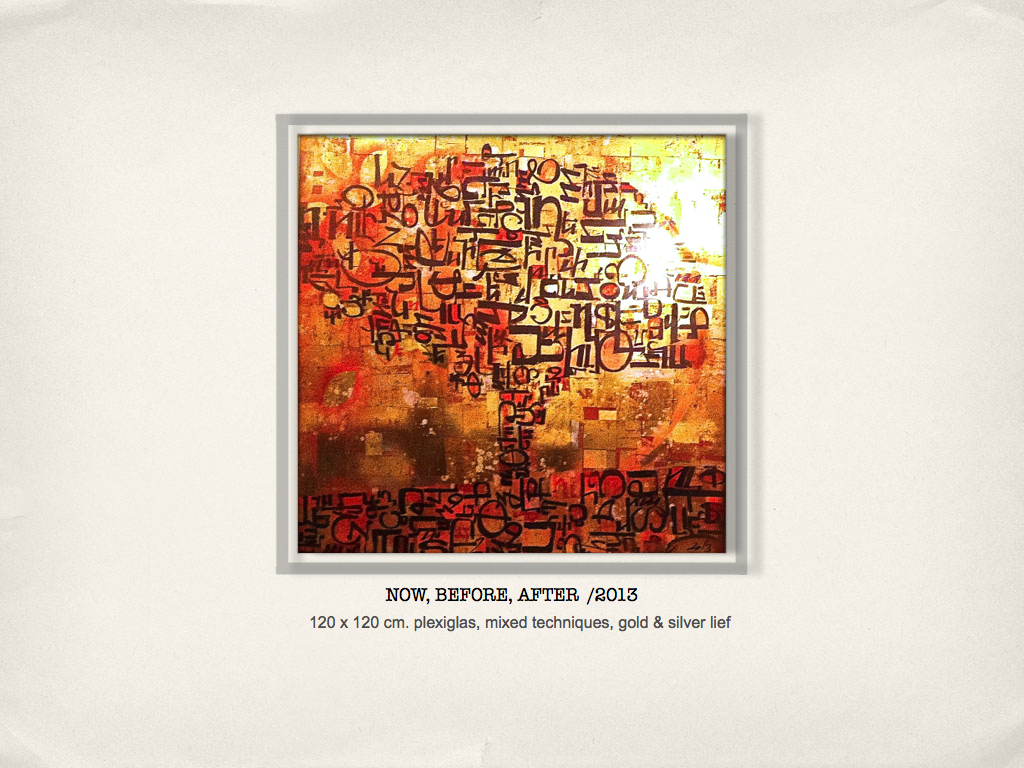

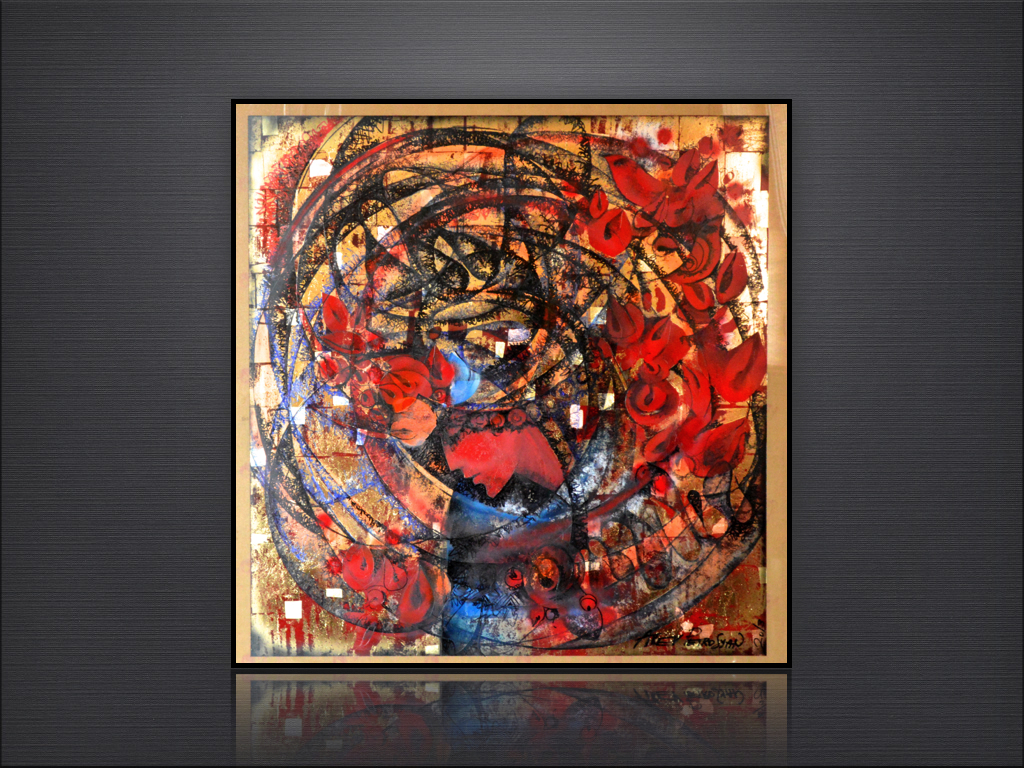

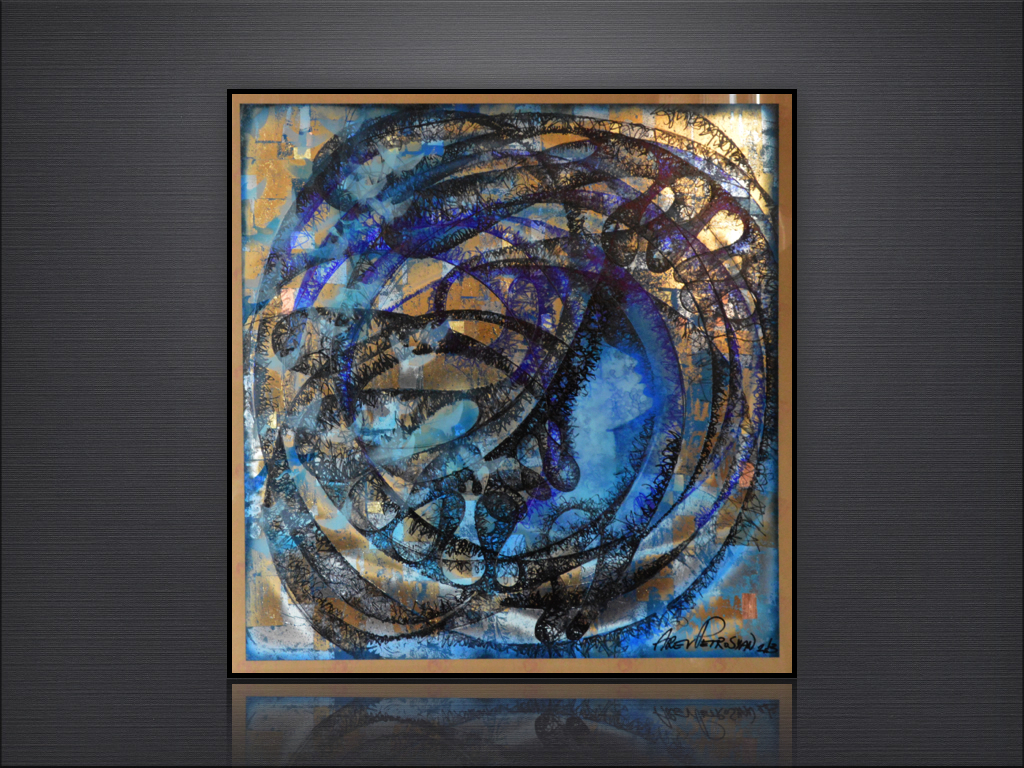

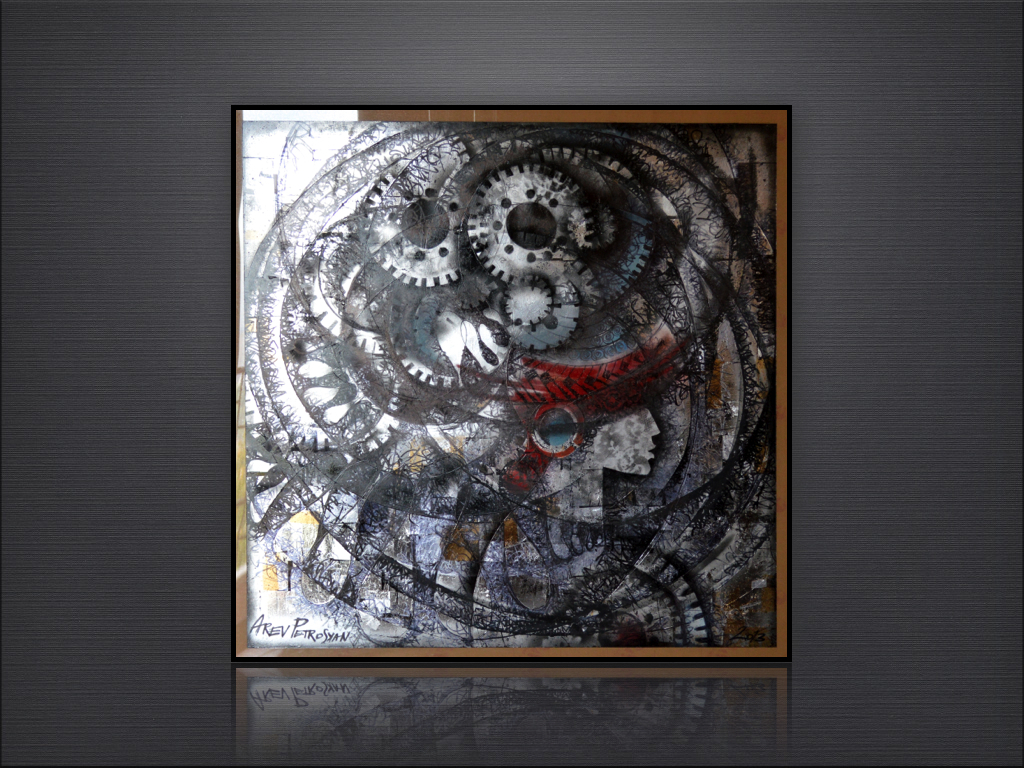

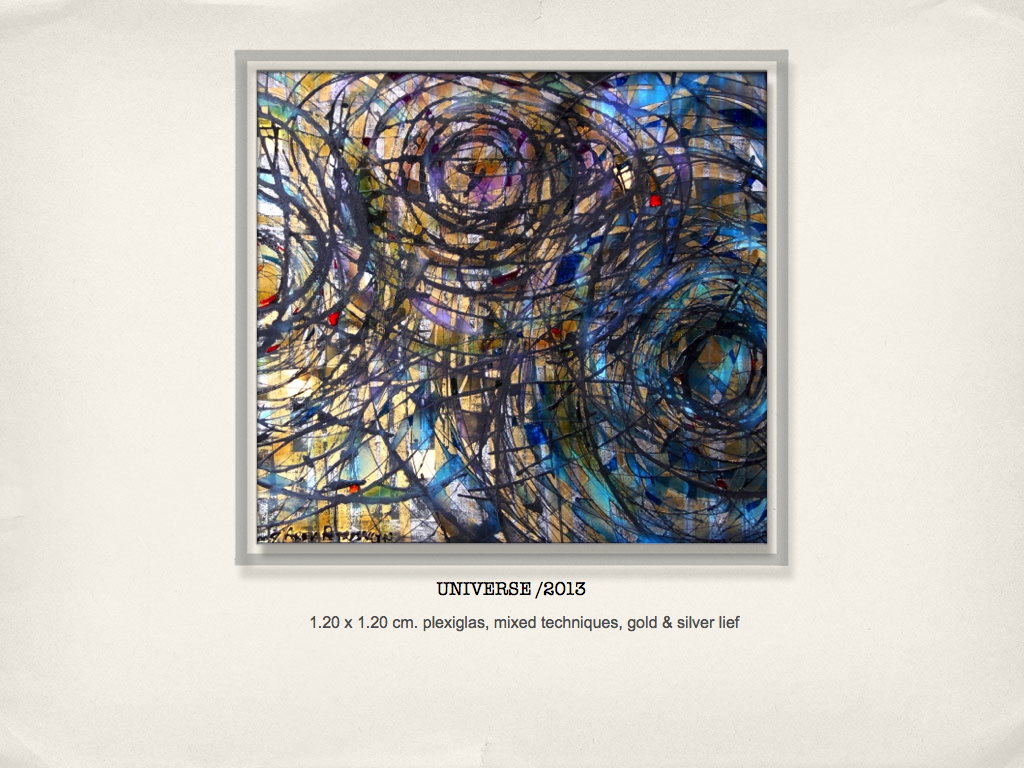

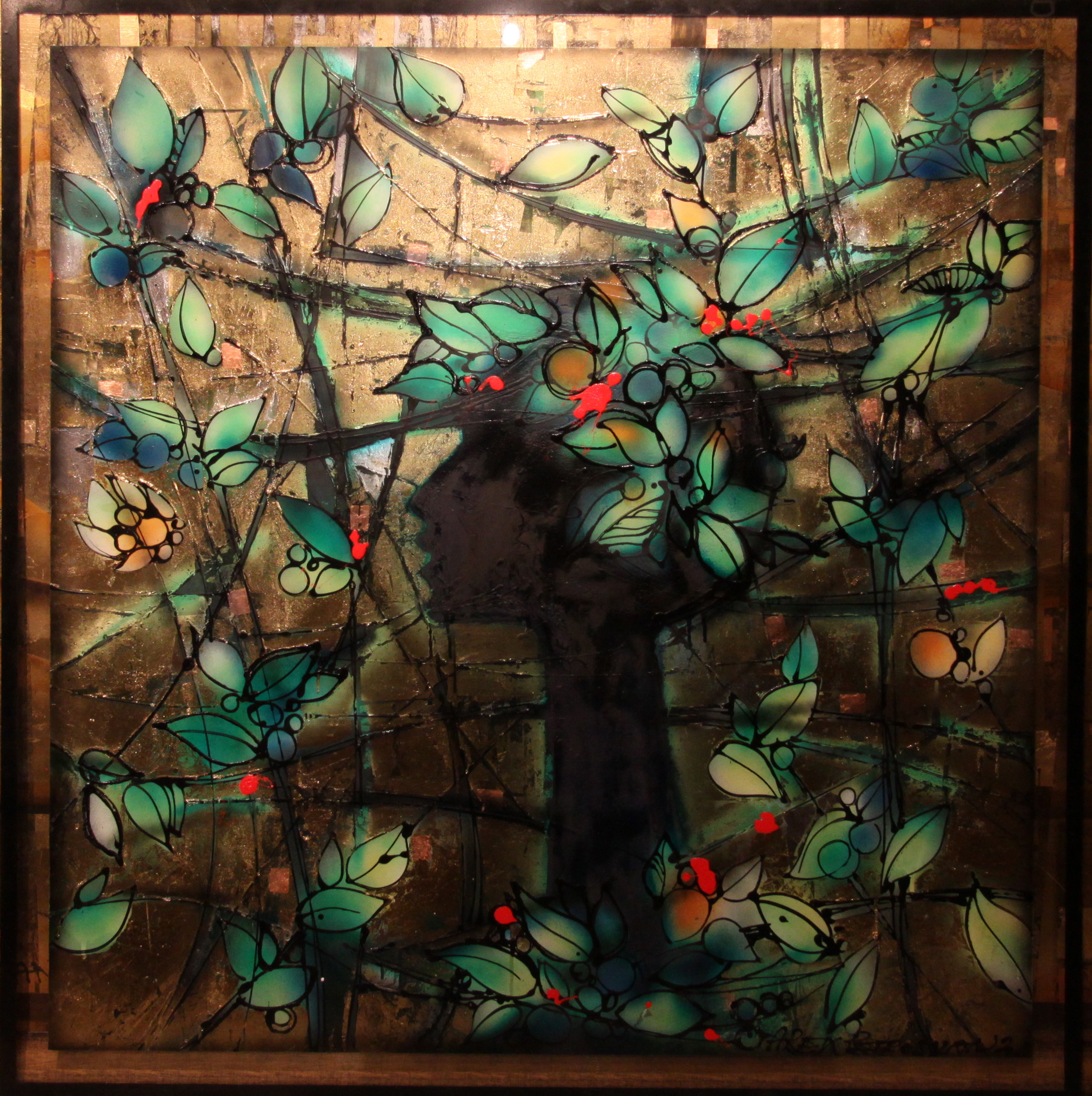

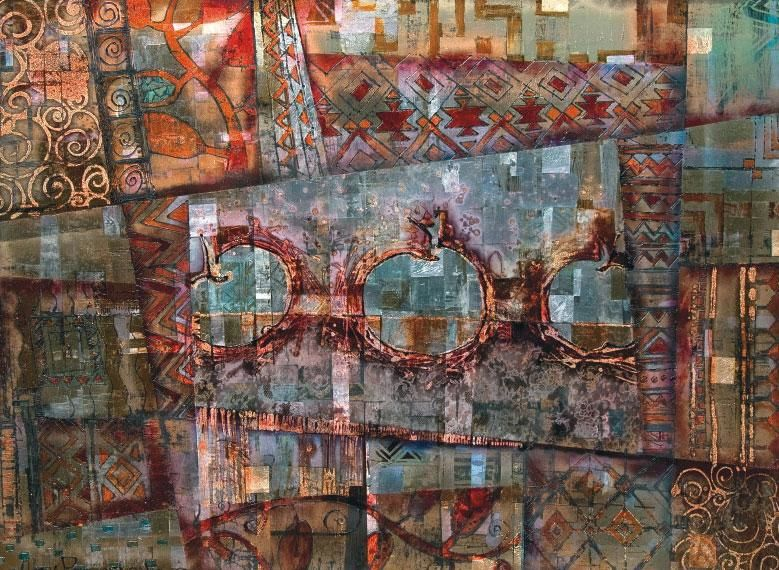

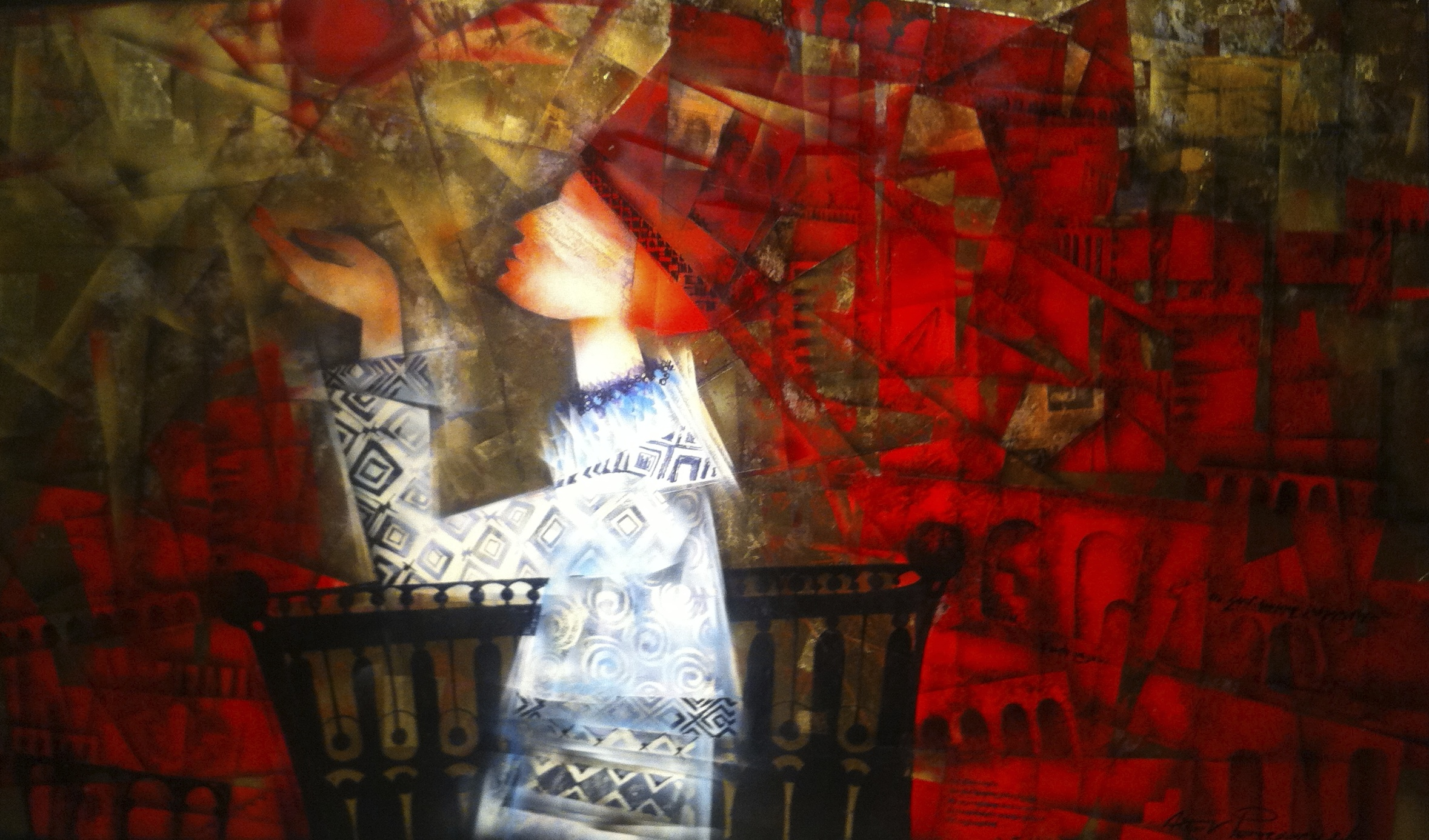

== See also ==
- List of Armenian artists
- List of Armenians
- Culture of Armenia
