= Kull shay =

Defunct Egyptian weekly magazine (1925–1927)

- Editor: Salama Musa
- Frequency: Weekly
- Publisher: Dar Al Hilal
- Founded: 1925
- Final issue: 1927
- Country: Egypt
- Based in: Cairo
- Language: Arabic
- Website: nbn-resolving.de/urn:nbn:de:hbz:5:1-302424

The Arabic-language non-political weekly magazine Kull shay (Arabic: كل شىء; DMG: Kull šayʾ; English: Everything) was first published in Cairo in 1925. The magazine produced a total of 105 issues until its closure in 1927. It was published by Dar Al Hilal. The managing editor was the famous journalist, writer and political theorist Salama Musa. He also published editorials in the magazine. One of the contributors was Palestinian writer Asma Tubi. In 1927, the magazine was merged with Al-Alam to form the periodical Kull šayʾ wa-l-ʿālam.
