= Adab wa Naqd =

Egyptian literary magazine

- Categories: Literary magazine
- Frequency: Monthly
- Publisher: National Progressive Unionist Rally Party
- Founded: 1984; 42 years ago
- Country: Egypt
- Based in: Cairo
- Language: Arabic
- ISSN: 1110-306X
- OCLC: 86068321

Adab wa Naqd (Arabic: Literature and Criticism) is a monthly literary magazine published in Egypt. It has been in circulation since 1984 and is affiliated with the National Progressive Unionist Rally Party.

== History and profile ==
Adab wa Naqd, based in Cairo, was established in 1984. The Progressive National Unionist Party is the publisher of the magazine which is published monthly.

Rifaat Al Said is the chairman of the magazine. Farida Al Naqqash served as the editor-in-chief of the magazine which she assumed in 1987. Another former editor-in-chief is Al Taher Makki. Helmi Salem was the managing editor and editor-in-chief of the magazine. Muhammad Afifi Matar, an Egyptian poet, is among former contributors of the magazine. Another Egyptian poet Iman Mersal served in the magazine as an editor for the cultural and literary reviews.

In addition to literary works and literary criticisms the magazine also publishes interviews with major artists and articles on history.

In November 2011, the magazine experienced serious financial problems and was about to be ceased.

== See also ==
- List of magazines in Egypt
