= Arev Monthly =

- Editor: Mohammed Refaat el Immam
- Frequency: Monthly
- Founded: 1997
- Final issue: April 2009
- Company: Arev daily
- Country: Egypt
- Based in: Cairo
- Language: Arabic
- Website: None

Arev Monthly (أريف in Arabic, meaning sun in Armenian) was a monthly published in Cairo, Egypt by the Armenian daily Arev in Arabic covering Armenian subjects and concentrating on Arab-Armenian relations.

It was established in 1997. The editor-in-chief was Mohammed Refaat el Immam. The monthly stopped publication in April 2009 after 12 years and 136 monthly issues. In April 2010, a very similar publication, Arek was launched with Mohammed Refaat el Imam as editor-in-chief.

== See also ==
- List of magazines in Egypt
