= Ar-Rawi (magazine) =

Defunct literary magazine in Egypt (1888–1890)

ar-Rāwī
- Categories: Literature, Satire
- Frequency: Monthly
- First issue: 1888
- Final issue: 1890
- Country: Egypt
- Based in: Alexandria
- Language: Arabic

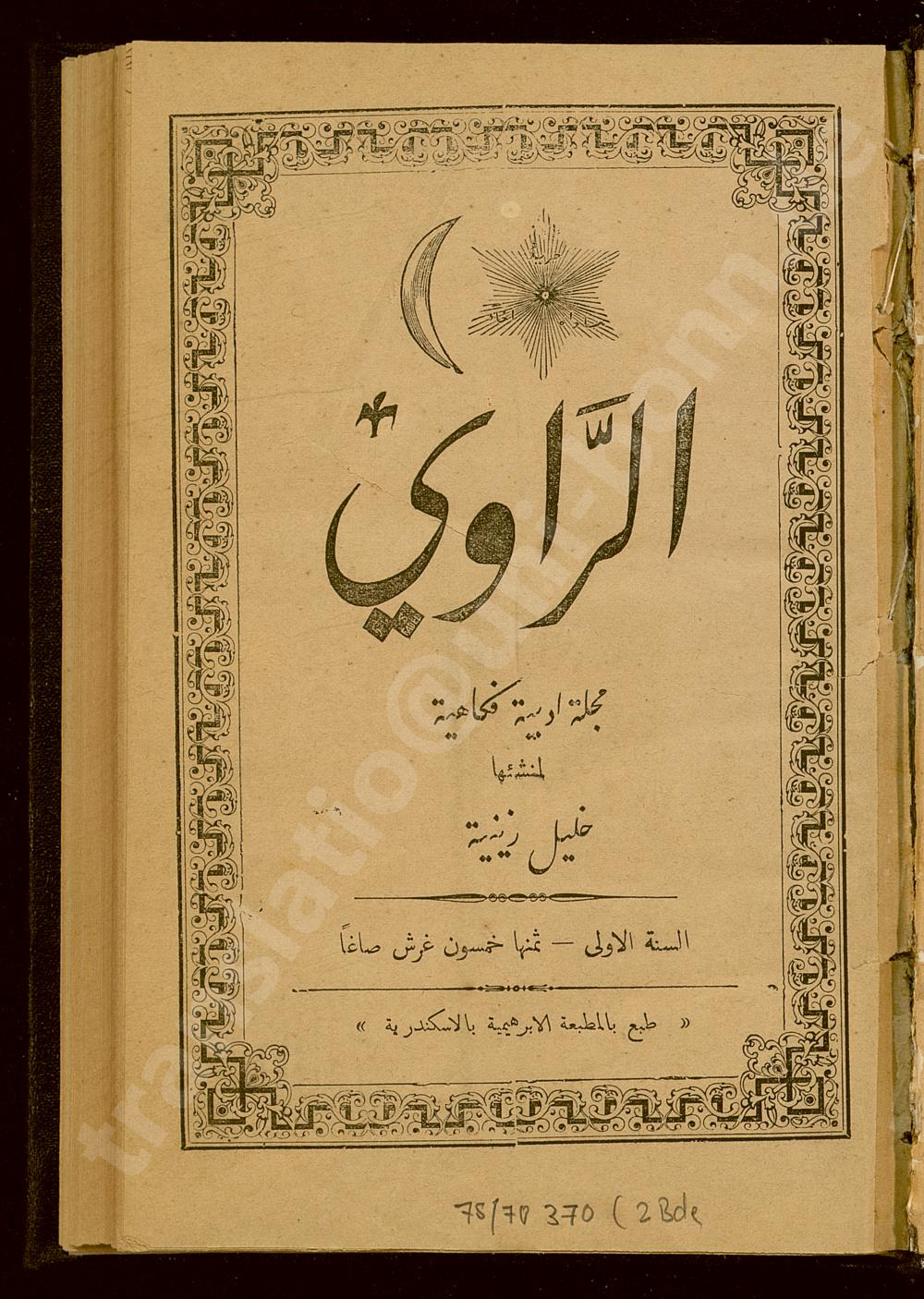
Cover of the first volume, first issue of ar-Rawi

The Egyptian magazine ar-Rawi (Arabic: الراوي; DMG: ar Rāwī; English: "The Narrator") was published in Alexandria, part of the Khedivate of Egypt, between 1888 and 1890. A total of 21 issues in two volumes were edited. Founder of the magazine was the Lebanese journalist and author Salim Sarkis (1869-1926). He also published many other magazines which are known as Sarkis journals. According to its subtitle, ar-Rawi particularly focused on topics related to literary and humorous content.
