= Rajāʼ Naqqāsh =

Egyptian journalist

Rajāʼ Naqqāsh (Arabic: رجاء النقاش; September 3, 1934 - February 8, 2008) was an Egyptian magazine editor.

== Life ==
Naqqāsh was born in Mit Samannoud, Aga Center, Dakahlia Governorate, Egypt, on September 3, 1934. He died in Cairo on February 8, 2008. He graduated from Cairo University with a degree in Arabic Language in 1956.

He began his career as an editor at the Egyptian magazine Rose al-Yusuf from 1959 to 1961. Following this, he served as a literary editor for the newspapers Akhbar El Yom and Al Akhbar from 1961 to 1964.

He went on to hold prominent positions as editor-in-chief for several well-known magazines, including Al-Kawakib and Al-Hilal. He also served as editor-in-chief and chairman of the board for Al-Eza'a wa Al-Television magazine. Additionally, he was the editor-in-chief of Al-Shabab magazine, which was published by the Ministry of Culture during the 1970s when Dr. Kamal Aboul-Magd was the minister.
