= Al-Maʿrifa (magazine) =

al-Maʿrifa
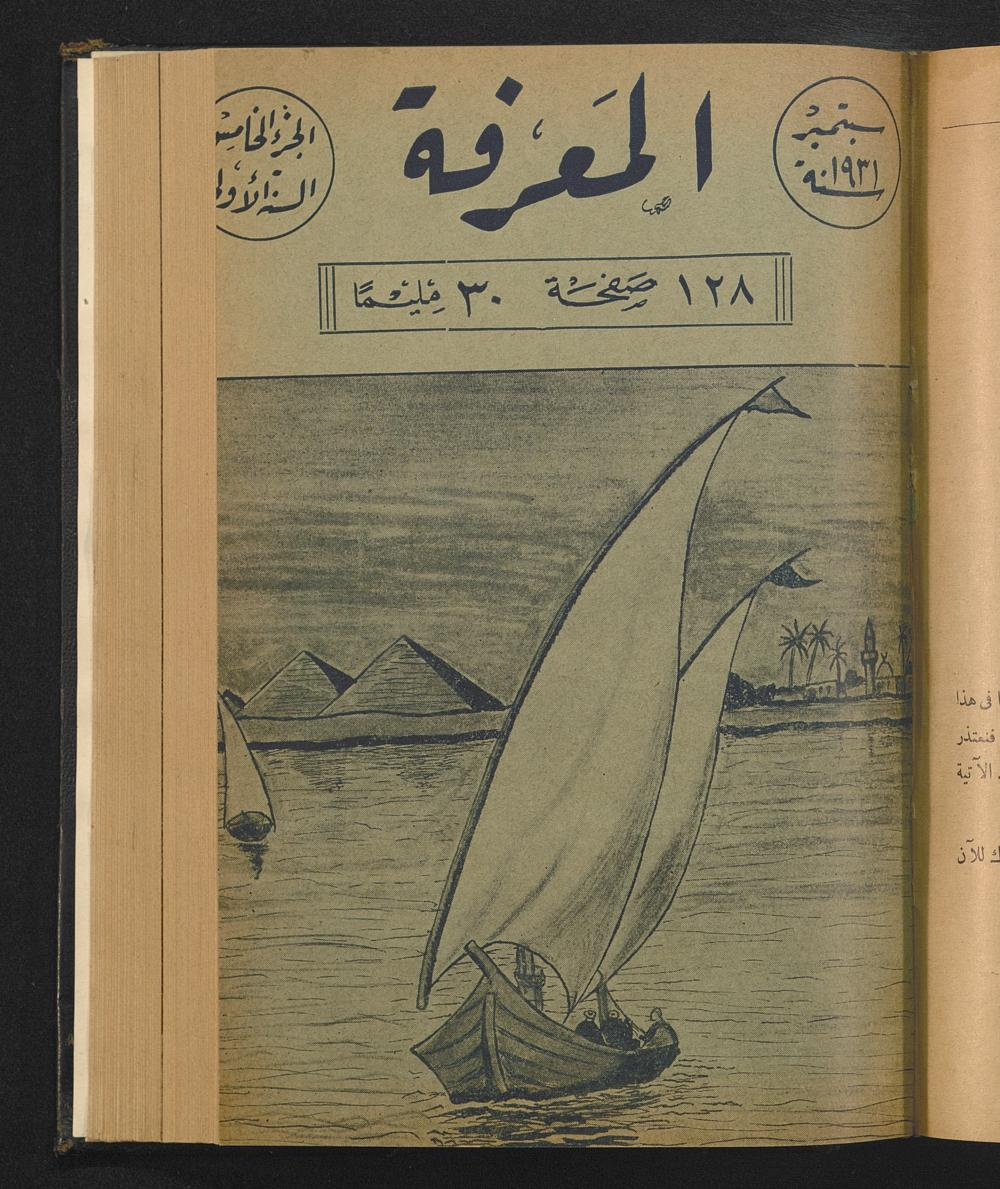
- Native name: المعرفة
- Categories: Sufism, Culture, Science
- Frequency: Monthly
- Publisher: ʿAbd Al ʿAzīz Al-Islāmbūlī
- Founded: 1931
- Final issue: 1934
- Country: Egypt
- Language: Arabic
- Website: al-Maʿrifa

The Arabic journal al-Maʿrifa (Arabic: المعرفة, romanized: al-Maʻrifah, DMG: al-Maʿrifa; English: "Knowledge") was published in Egypt between 1931 and 1934. The editor ʿAbd Al ʿAzīz Al-Islāmbūlī published it for three years and a total of 30 issues. The preface states that this monthly journal is sufistic oriented and aims to inform the readers scientifically and culturally. Not only art, culture and literature were addressed but above all scientific knowledge was published and discussed. According to the editor Al-Islāmbūlī sufistic moral and wisdom were not a priority but to be taken into account.
