= La Femme Nouvelle =

Literary magazine in Egypt (1944–1952)

- Categories: Literary magazine
- Founder: Princess Chevikar Ibrahim
- Founded: 1944
- Final issue: 1952
- Country: Egypt
- Based in: Cairo
- Language: French

La Femme Nouvelle (French: The New Woman) was a French language literary and cultural magazine published from 1944 to 1952 in Cairo, Egypt. The magazine has been known for its editor-in-chief and later publisher, Doria Shafik, who was an eminent Egyptian feminist and activist.

== History and profile ==
La Femme Nouvelle was established in Cairo in 1944. The founder was Princess Chevikar Ibrahim, the first wife of King Fuad I. The magazine featured articles on the history and cultural heritage of Egypt and targeted upper-class women and French-speaking elites. Doria Shafik became the editor-in-chief of the magazine in 1945, and following the death of Princess Chevikar Ibrahim in 1947 she acquired the magazine. The magazine ceased publication in 1952.
