= Sahifat Dar al-Ulum (magazine) =

Defunct educational magazine in Egypt (1934–1947)

Saḥīfat Dār-al-ʿUlūm
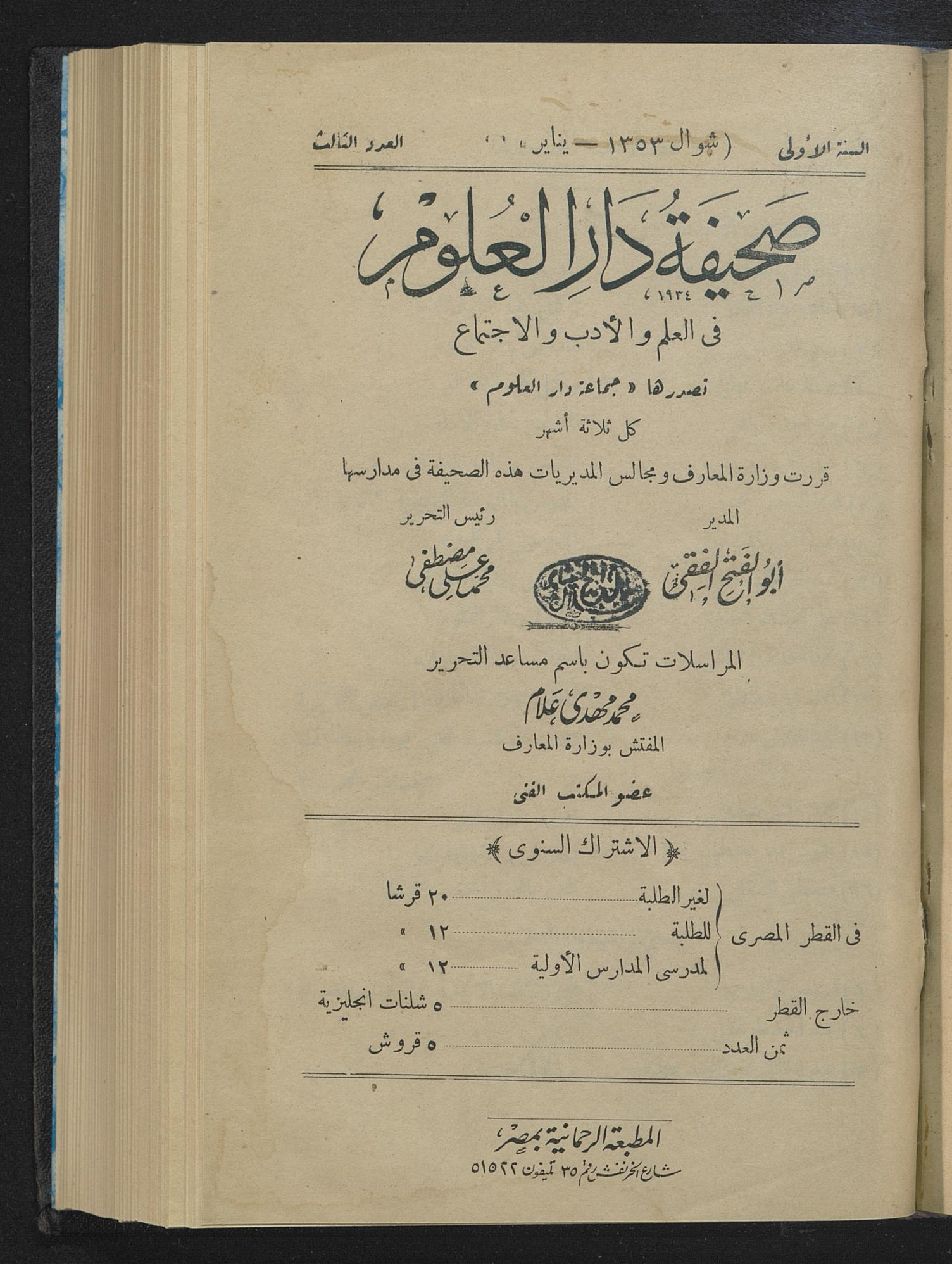
- Categories: Education magazine
- Founder: Sayyid Qutb
- Founded: 1934
- Final issue: 1947
- Country: Egypt
- Based in: Cairo
- Language: Arabic
- Website: Saḥīfat Dār-al-ʿUlūm

Sahifat Dar al-Ulum (Arabic: صحيفة دار العلوم; DMG: Saḥīfat Dār-al-ʿUlūm; English: "The Journal of the House of Sciences") was an Arabic journal published in Cairo from 1934 to 1947. It was founded by Sayyid Qutb (1905-1966), a well-known Egyptian writer, poet, and critic, who is considered to be one of the Muslim Brotherhoodʼs most important thought leaders, as well as Saʿd al-Labban and Muhammad Ibrahim Jabr. After training as a teacher, Qutb graduated from the Dār al-ʿUlūm University in Cairo during the founding year of the journal. In terms of content, the editors focused on the “latest pedagogical, social and linguistic theories” and pursued the goal to compete with the reputation of al-Azhar and the Egyptian University through their intellectual Islamic orientation and their high demands on the students. In addition to Saḥīfat Dār-al-ʿUlūm, Qutb also published his articles in other journals of various ideological orientations, including ar-Risala and aš-Šuʼūn al-iğtimāʿīya.
