= At-Tahdhib =

Egyptian reform magazine

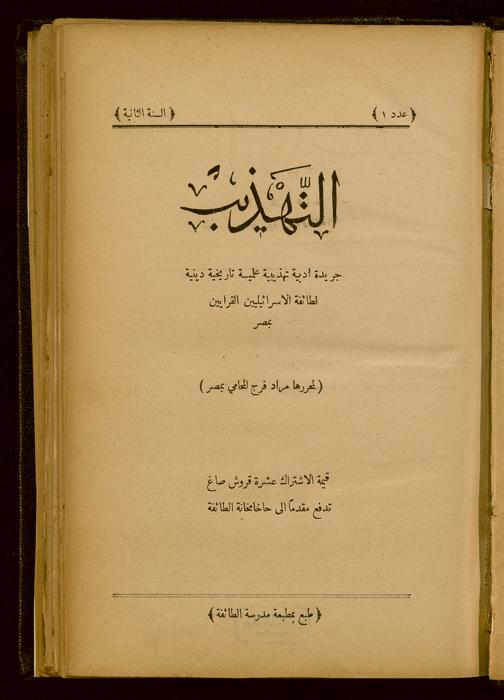
- Categories: Literature, science, religion, culture
- Frequency: Monthly
- Publisher: Murād Farag
- Founder: Murād Farag
- Founded: 1901
- Final issue: 1903
- Country: Egypt
- Based in: Cairo
- Language: Arabic
- Website: at-Tahḏīb

The Arabic-language reform journal at-Tahdhib (Arabic: تهذيب; DMG: at-Tahḏīb; English: "Edification") was published in Cairo from 1901 to 1903 in a total of 33 issues. It was published monthly during the first year and afterwards three times per month. It is probably the oldest extant Jewish magazine in Arabic language. Its founder, editor, and principal author, the Egyptian Karaite Jewish lawyer Murād Farag (Faraj) (1866–1956), used the magazine as a platform for changes in Egypt's Karaite Jewish community, the magazine's target group. The content of the magazine focused on identity and cultural orientation as well as legal and educational reforms. It was multifaceted and contained essays on moral behavior and proposed solutions as well as legal matters such as inheritance, consanguinity, circumcision and Jewish dietary laws (kashrut).
