= Bint Al Nil =

Feminist magazine in Egypt (1945–1957)

- Editor: Doria Shafik
- Categories: Women's magazine
- Founder: Doria Shafik
- Founded: 1945
- First issue: 1 November 1945
- Final issue: 1957
- Country: Egypt
- Based in: Cairo
- Language: Arabic

Bint Al Nil (Arabic: Daughter of the Nile) was a feminist magazine which was founded and edited by Doria Shafik, a well-known Egyptian woman journalist and activist, from 1945 to 1957 in Cairo, Egypt.

== History and profile ==
Bint Al Nil was established by Doria Shafik in 1945. A friend of her husband, Ibrahim Abdu, helped Doria Shafik in the foundation of the magazine. The first issue appeared on 1 November 1945. Until 1948 the magazine focused on more general themes in women's lives in Egypt, but then began to discuss the women's rights. It became one of the publications which called for the termination of polygamy and forced marriage. As a result of this change in its content the magazine was accused of supporting women to quit their family roles and to enter into the workplace. In response to these accusations Doria Shafik published an article arguing that Bint Al Nil encouraged women to look for their rights and to pay attention to family life at the same time. From 1946 the magazine published a supplement entitled Al Katkut targeting children, making Bint Al Nil the first Arab magazine which offered a children's supplement.

Bint Al Nil ceased publication in 1957. In fact, the magazine was banned by the Egyptian authorities due to Doria Shafik's harsh criticisms over Egyptian President Gamal Abdel Nasser accusing him being an authoritarian ruler. In addition, the government of Nasser put Shafik under house arrest.

== Legacy ==
Selected articles from the magazine were archived by the American University in Cairo. In February 2018 Shiva Balagh exhibited her works in memory of Bint Al Nil and Doria Shafik's organization with the same name in Cairo.

In 2022, four editorials published in Bint Al Nil between 1948 and 1957 were translated by Tom Abi Samra and made accessible online by Duke University Press's journal Meridians.
