= Al Arghul =

Literary magazine in Egypt (1894-1900)

- Categories: Literary magazine
- Frequency: Biweekly
- Founder: Sheikh Muhammad Al Najjar
- Founded: 1894
- Final issue: 1900
- Country: Egypt
- Based in: Cairo
- Language: Arabic

Al Arghul (Arabic: The Reed Flute) was a biweekly literary magazine which was published in Cairo, Egypt, in the period 1894–1900. The founder was a teacher at Al-Azhar University, Sheikh Muhammad Al Najjar who also edited the magazine throughout its existence. The magazine was published on a biweekly basis and described itself as a scientific, literary, comedic and educational publication. Al Najjar declared the goal of the magazine as follows: "to train the soul, educate the mind and nourish the spirit (of the readers). It (Al Arghul) has nothing to do with politics, external or internal, nor do we comment in it on anything related to links between governments or state." However, the magazine had a supportive approach towards the reigning khedive, namely Abbas Hilmi. It published articles written in colloquial Egyptian Arabic. The magazine frequently featured reader contributors, including poems.
