= Doria Shafik =

Egyptian activist

Doria Shafiq درية شفيق
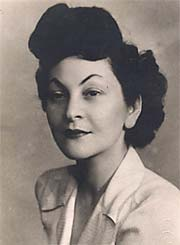
- Born: 14 December 1908; Tanta, Egypt
- Died: 20 September 1975 (aged 66); Cairo, Egypt
- Occupations: author, feminist, revolutionary

Doria Shafik (Note: Also spelled as Durriyyah Shafīq.) (Arabic: درية شفيق; 14 December 1908 – 20 September 1975) was an Egyptian feminist, poet and editor, and one of the principal leaders of the women's liberation movement in Egypt in the mid-1940s. As a direct result of her efforts, Egyptian women were granted the right to vote by the Egyptian constitution.

== Early life ==
Doria Shafik was born on 14 December 1908 to Ahmad Chafik and Ratiba Nassif in Tanta, Egypt. She studied in a French mission primary school in Tanta and a Tanta secondary school for girls until 16 years. Then she studied the last 2 years of secondary education called bacaloria in Cairo. At the age of 18 she became the one of first Egyptian girls to earn the degree of bacaloria for secondary school. She was awarded a scholarship by the Egyptian Ministry of Education to study at Sorbonne University in Paris. She also studied for a PhD in philosophy at the Sorbonne. She wrote two theses, one refuting the merely utilitarian ends generally associated with Ancient Egyptian art, and the second, arguing about recognising women's equal rights. She was awarded her PhD with high qualifications (Mention très honorable). In 1935 as a girl in Egypt, she entered a beauty pageant, which sparked controversy.

While in Paris, Shafik married Nureldin Raga'i, a law student who was also on scholarship and working on his PhD.

== Career and activism ==
Upon her return from France to Egypt in 1940, Shafik hoped to contribute to the education of her country's youth, but the dean of the Faculty of Literature of Cairo University denied her a teaching position on the pretext that she was "too liberal."

In 1945, Princess Chevicar, the first wife of Egypt's then former King Fuad I, offered Shafik the position of editor-in-chief of La Femme Nouvelle, a French cultural and literary magazine addressing the country's elite. Shafik accepted the position, and with Chevicar's death in 1947, took complete responsibility for the magazine, including its financing. Under her direction La Femme Nouvelle gained regional status. Also in 1945, Shafik decided to publish an Arabic magazine, Bint Al Nil (meaning Daughter of Nile in English), intended to educate Egyptian women and to help them to have the most effective role possible within their family and their society. The first issue came out in November 1945 and was almost immediately sold out.

In 1948 Shafik created the Bint Al Nil Union to help solve women's primary social problems and to ensure their inclusion in their country's policies. The union also worked to eradicate illiteracy by setting up centres for that purpose throughout the country, set up an employment office and a cafeteria for working women.

Shafik was deeply inspired by Huda Sha'arawi, the pioneering Egyptian feminist leader and founder of the Egyptian Feminist Union, and she was even more determined to lead the feminist struggle after Sha'arawi's death in 1947. In the memorial that took place on the 40th day of Sha'arawi's death, she gave a speech galvanizing the attendees to keep fighting for women's rights and stay committed to the demands of equality and justice. In her speech, she said, "This fortieth day after the death of Huda Shaarawi conveys the weight of everything she has done for the Egyptians and for all the people of the Orient. Remember her, because remembrance serves to reinforce faith and because she has struggled to create a proud and cultured society. Remember her until you understand your indebtedness to her. She lived for you, and she has also died for you. And I shall make sure that mourning helps us to continue what she began… You must struggle to reinforce her memory."

=== Storming Parliament ===
In February 1951, she managed to secretly bring together 1500 women from Egypt's two leading feminist groupings (Bint Al Nil and the Egyptian Feminist Union). She organized a march of people that interrupted parliament for four hours after they gathered there with a series of demands mainly related to women's socioeconomic rights. Mufidah Abdul Rahman was chosen to defend Shafik in court in regards to this. When the case went to trial, many Bint al-Nil supporters attended the courtroom, and the judge adjourned the hearing indefinitely.

However, in spite of receiving promises from the President of the Senate, women's rights experienced no improvements.

=== Female military unit ===
In 1951, Shafik "started a uniformed paramilitary unit of the Daughter of Nile". In January 1952, she led a brigade of its members to surround and shut down a branch of Barclays Bank, though she was arrested by the police when the demonstration turned "rowdy".

=== Bint Al Nil Party ===
After the Egyptian Revolution of 1952, Doria Shafik requested government recognition of Bint Al Nil as a political party, with Doria Shafik herself as its president, which the government accepted to grant.

=== First hunger strike ===
On 12 March 1954, Doria Shafik undertook an eight-day hunger strike at the press syndicate, in protest at the creation of a constitutional committee with no women on it. She ended her strike upon receiving a written statement that President Naguib was committed to a constitution that respected the rights of women.

=== Trip around the world ===
As a result of the interest sparked by her hunger strike, Doria Shafik was invited to lecture in Asia, Europe and the United States about Egyptian women. She travelled to Italy, England, France, the United States, Japan, India, Ceylon and Pakistan.

=== Right to vote ===
As a result of Doria Shafik's efforts, women were granted the right to vote under the constitution of 1956, with the proviso, however, that they must be literate, which was not a prerequisite for male voting.

=== Second hunger strike ===
In 1957 Shafik undertook a second hunger strike in the Indian embassy, in protest over President Gamal Abdel Nasser's dictatorial regime. As a result, she was put under house arrest by Nasser, her name was banned from the press and her magazines from circulation.

=== Literary work ===
In addition to her magazines, Shafik wrote a novel, L'Esclave de Sultane (Slave of King) about slavery of a woman to a man, several volumes of poetry published by Pierre Fanlac, and her own memoirs that were translated into many languages. Poetry from her final days was translated by Nadeen Shaker and published in The Cairo Review:

Daughter of the Nile

I have demanded women’s rights

My fight was enlarged to human freedom

And what was the result?

I have no more friends.

So what? Until the end of the road

I will proceed alone.

— Doria Shafik

== Seclusion and death ==
Following her house arrest Doria Shafik led a solitary life, even when her movement was no longer restricted. She spent her last years reading, and writing. She came to her death after jumping from her balcony in 1975. The New York Times regretted not printing her obituary and finally printed one in 2018.

== Personal life ==
Shafik married Nureldin Ragai in Paris in 1937. He would go on to become a prominent lawyer in Egypt and supported all of her efforts. They were together for 31 years until 1968 when they divorced, and had two daughters, Jehane and Aziza. Doria Shafik was living a solitary life and was visited by her daughters and her grandchildren.

== Tribute ==
On 14 December 2016, Google dedicated a Doodle to the writer for the 108th anniversary of her birth. The Doodle reached all the countries of the Arab World. In 2018, The New York Times published a belated obituary for her.
