= Al-Ahali (magazine) =

Defunct Egyptian political magazine

- Categories: Political magazine
- Publisher: Ismaʿil Abaza
- Founded: 1894
- Final issue: 1895
- Country: Egypt
- Based in: Cairo
- Language: Arabic
- Website: nbn-resolving.de/urn:nbn:de:hbz:5:1-280738

The Arabic-language journal al-Ahali (Arabic: الأهالي; DMG: al-Ahālī; English: "The People") was published between 1894 and 1895 by Ismaʿil Abaza in Cairo. Abaza defined the objective of the journal as "notifying the government of the people's wishes, desires, complaints of misdeeds and grievances". Like the journal Al-Muqattam, it focused on serving the government by conveying its message to the people.
