= Assembly of European Wine-producing Regions =

AREV - Assembly of European Wine Regions
- Abbreviation: AREV
- Formation: 20 June 1988
- Purpose: Lobbying on behalf of European wine-producing regions
- Headquarters: Brussels
- Location: Belgium
- Region served: European Union
- Official language: French, German, Spanish, Italian, Portuguese, English
- President: Franck Leroy
- Main organ: Plenary Council
- Affiliations: Assembly of European Regions
- Website: https://www.arev.org/

The Assembly of European Wine Regions or Assemblée des Régions Européennes Viticoles (AREV) is an organisation of political and professionals representatives of wine regions within the European Union (EU) and Eastern Europe. It lobbies the EU on matters affecting its members, and acts as a forum for discussion of policy and marketing.

== History ==
The European Wine Regions Conference (CERV) was created on 20 June 1988 under Alsatian law. It became the Assembly of European Wine Regions (AREV) in 1994. It is financed by membership subscriptions, and is based in Bordeaux with an office in Strasbourg. The industry representatives are grouped together in the European Wine Trade Council (CEPV), which drafts documents to be approved by the plenary council.

== Members ==
Alentejo, Alsace, Aquitaine, Arad, Aragón, Bács-Kiskun, Baden-Württemberg, Baranya, Bavaria, Borsod-Abaúj-Zemplén, Burgundy, Burgenland, Castilla-La-Mancha, Castilla y León, Catalonia, Centre, Champagne-Ardenne, Constanta, Extremadura, Franche-Comté, Friuli-Venezia-Giulia, Galicia, Grand Est, Hesse, Languedoc-Roussillon, La Rioja, Liguria, Lombardia, Macedonia, Madeira, Madrid, Midi-Pyrénées, Murcia, Navarra, Niederösterreich, Norte, Occitanie, Odesa oblast, Os Açores, Pays de Loire, Piedmont, Provence-Alpes-Côte d'Azur, Rhineland-Palatinate, Rhône-Alpes, Sicily, Slovenia, Steiermark, The Czech Republic, Tolna, Trento, Valais, Valencia, Valle d'Aosta, Veneto.

== Meetings ==
- Jun 20–21, 1988 - Aquitaine - Bourg s/Gironde – 1st Plenary Session
- May 23, 1989 - Baden-Württemberg - Stuttgart – International Council
- Nov 05–07, 1990 - Baden-Württemberg - Freiburg im Breisgau - Plenary Session
- Oct 21–23, 1991 - Catalunya - Vilafranca del Penedès – Plenary Session
- Apr 22–23, 1992 - Andalucía - Jerez de la Frontera – 1st World Assembly
- Nov 22–23, 1993 - Languedoc - Roussillon - Montpellier - Plenary Session - International Bureau - Steering Committee n° 3
- Oct 26, 1994 - Sicily - Marsala - Ist International Council – Regions information meeting (Dyonisos)
- Feb 23, 1995 - La Rioja - Logroño - II International Council - International Bureau
- Sep18-19, 1995 - Rheinland-Pfalz - Mainz - III International Council
- Nov 06–07, 1995 - Steiermark - Graz - II Plenary Session - International Bureau
- May 6, 1996 - Languedoc-Roussillon - Montpellier - IV International Council - International Bureau
- Sep 04–08, 1996 - Baranya - Pécs - III Plenary Session - International Bureau
- Apr 07–08, 1997 - Norte - Porto - V International Council
- Jun 13–14, 1997 - Aquitaine - Bordeaux - IV Plenary Session - International Bureau
- Nov 21–22, 1997 - Valenciana - Valencia - VI International Council
- May 13–16, 1998 - Baden-Württemberg - Stuttgart - Extraordinary session - V Plenary Session - International Bureau - VII International Council
- Sep 08–11, 1998 - Alentejo - Evora - VI Plenary Session - International Bureau
- Apr 14–16, 1999 - Castilla-La Mancha - Toledo – VII Plenary Session - International Bureau - VIII International Council
- Oct 14–16, 1999 - Piedmont - Turin - IX International Council - International Bureau
- May 18–22, 2000 - Central Macedonia - Thessaloniki - VIII Plenary Session
- Oct 26–28, 2000 – Burgundy – Dijon - X International Council
- May 20–22, 2001 - La Rioja - Logroño - IX Plenary Session - International Bureau – XI International Council
- Sep 08, 2001 - Madrid - Madrid - XII International Council
- Nov 8-10 2001 - Aosta Valley - Courmayeur – XIII International Council
- May 16–18, 2002 - Baranya & Tolna - Pécs/Szekszárd - X Plenary Session - International Bureau - XIV International Council
- Jan 16–19, 2003 - Sicily - Catania - XV International Council - International Bureau
- Jun 02–03, 2003 - Languedoc-Roussillon - Montpellier - XI Plenary Session - International Bureau
- Nov 06–09, 2003 - Hessen - Wiesbaden - XVI International Council
- Apr 22–24, 2004 - Norte - Porto - XII Plenary Session - XVII International Council
- Jun 09–11, 2005 - Aosta Valley - Aosta - XIII Plenary Session, Extraordinary Plenary session, XVIII International Council
- Apr 07–09, 2006 - South Tyrol – Merano - XIV Plenary Session - XIX International Council
- Jul 27–28, 2006 - Czech Republic - Brno - XX International Council
- Apr 20–21, 2007 - Baden-Württemberg - Stuttgart - XV Plenary Session and XXI International Council
- Sept 03–05, 2007 - Romania - Alba Iulia - 22nd International Council
- May 30, 2007 - Reims - Champagne-Ardenne - Plenary Session
- Nov 5, 2008 - Mainz – Rhineland Palatinate - International Bureau
- Jun 19, 2009 - Evora - Alentejo - Plenary Session
- May 28, 2010 - Poreč - Istrie/Croatie - Plenary Session
- Apr 29–30, 2011 - Castilla-La Mancha - Toledo - Plenary Session
- Jun 26–28, 2018 - Niederösterreich - Hainburg-an-der-Donau - Plenary Session
- Jun 11–13, 2019 - Açores - Horta - XXVII Plenary Session
- Nov 26, 2020 - Online (due to the COVID19) - XXVIII Plenary Session
- Jun 21–22, 2022 - Baden-Württemberg - Heilbronn - XXIX Plenary Session
- Oct 26–28, 2023 - Toulouse - European Wine Day
- Jun 3-5, 2024 - Iași - XXX Plenary Session
- Oct 20-21, 2025 - Strasbourg - XXXI Plenary Session & European Wine Day
- Debates on genetically modified organisms and on the Common Organization of the Market for Wine (COM Wine). AREV is against the COM.
