= Al-Alam (magazine) =

Egyptian weekly, 1926–1927

al-ʿĀlam
- Editor: ʿAli Fahmi Kamil
- Categories: Politics, society, satire
- Frequency: Weekly
- Founder: ʿAli Fahmi Kamil
- Founded: 1926
- Final issue: 1927
- Country: Egypt
- Based in: Cairo
- Language: Arabic
- Website: nbn-resolving.de/urn:nbn:de:hbz:5:1-283793

The Arabic-language satirical magazine al-Alam (Arabic: العلم; DMG: al-ʿĀlam; English: "The World") was published weekly in Cairo between 1926 and 1927 in a total of 51 issues. Its founder and editor was ʿAli Fahmi Kamil (1870-1926 ), who also served as manager of the journal al-Liwaʾ. The journal deals mostly with political and social events of its time. In 1927, the magazine was merged with another publication, Kull shay, to form the periodical Kull šayʾ wa-l-ʿālam.
