= Project Translatio =

Digitization Project Translatio
- Website type: Digital library
- Available in: English
- Country of origin: Germany
- Owner: University of Bonn
- Commercial: No
- Registration: No
- Launched: 1 November 2013; 12 years ago
- Current status: Active

Access
- Cost: Free

Coverage
- Record depth: Full-text
- Format coverage: Newspapers and magazines
- Temporal coverage: 1860–1945
- Geospatial coverage: Iran, Ottoman Empire, Arab World

Links
- Website: Digitization Project Translatio

Digitization Project Translatio is a freely-available digital collection of 19th and 20th century periodicals in Arabic, Persian and Ottoman Turkish, created and maintained at the University of Bonn. The project started in 2013, with funding provided by the state government of North Rhine-Westphalia. The publications had been provided in collaboration with several German institutions, eventually being digitized at Bonn.

The collection is considered a strong archive of Egypt-based periodicals. Some of the publications in the archive are also rare or hard to find. The project's website has been praised for being user-friendly, while use of German language in descriptions and metadata as well as lack of information on editors and authors has been described as the disadvantages.

== Archive ==
The archive covers between 1860 and 1945, and currently includes the following publications:

Persian

- Daneshkada
- Ayandeh
- Danesh
- Akhtar
- Kaveh
- Danesh (1910–1911)
- Jangal (1917–1918)
- Baba Shamal (1943–1947)
- Tarbiyat (1896–1907)
- Shokufeh (1913–1919)
- Sur-e Esrafil (1907–1909)
- Yadgar (1944–1949)
- Seraj al Akhbar (1911–1919)
- Sharq (1924–1932)
- Bahar (1910–1922)
- Habl al-Matin (1907–1908)
- Sharafat (1896–1903)
- Sharaf (1882–1891)
- Nashriya-i Madrasa-i Mubaraka-i Dar al-Funun-i Tabriz (1893–1894)
- Majlis (1906–1908)
- Nama-i farhangistan (1943–1947)
- Ruznama-yi Millati (1866–1870)

Arabic

- Ad-Diya
- Al-Bayan
- Al-Jamia
- At-Tabib
- Az-Zuhur
- Al-Maʿrifa
- Al-Muqtataf
- Al-Irfan
- Apollo
- Al-Katib al-misri
- Al-Hurriya
- Ruh al-Qudus
- Sahifat Dar al-Ulum
- Magallat Kulliyat al-Adab bi-l-Gamiʿa al-Misriya
- Al-Fajr
- Ar-Rawi
- Al-Balagh al-Usbuʿi
- Ad-Dunya al-Musawwara
- Magallat Kulliyat al-Adab bi-l-Gamiʿat Faruq al-Awwal
- Al-Fukaha
- At-Tahdhib
- Al-Ahali
- Al-Alam
- Al-Ahrar al-Musawwara

Turkish

- Kadro
- Shehbal
- Diyojen
- Demet
- Anadolu Mecmuası
- Hikmet
- Muharrir
- Güleryüz
- Aydede
- Eşref
- Hamiyet
- Aşiyan
- Karagöz
- Davul
- Nahid
- Aşiyan
- Her Ay
- Resimli Ay
- Sevimli Ay
- Envâr-ı Zekâ
- Yarım Ay
- Hayat
- Envâr-ı Zekâ
- Boşboğaz ile güllabi
- Âyine
- Kadınlık

== See also ==
- Nashriyah
- List of digital library projects
