= Effat Sayyah Sepanlou =

- عفت سیاح سپانلو
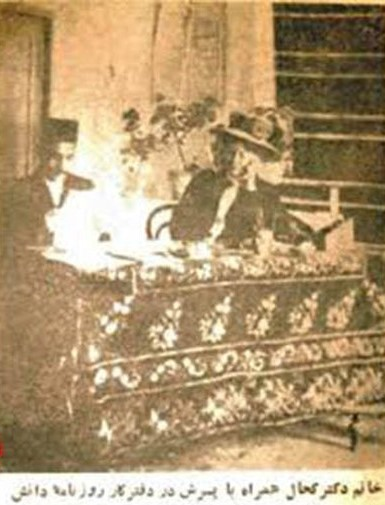
- Kahhal with her son Abbas Masum in the office of Danesh, Tehran, 1910
- Born: c. 1881
- Died: 1965 or 1966
- Other names: Khanom-e Doctor Kahhal; Lady Doctor Kahhal; Ma'sumeh Kahhal; Somayyeh Kahhal
- Occupations: Ophthalmologist, publisher, journalist
- Known for: Founding Danesh
- Children: Abbas Masum
- Relatives: Khosrow Sinai (grandson)

Effat Sayyah Sepanlou (Persian: عفت سیاح سپانلو, c. 1881–1965 or 1966), better known as Khanom-e Doctor Kahhal (Persian: خانم دکتر کحال; lit. Lady Doctor Kahhal) and Banu Kahhal (Persian: بانو کحال, lit. Lady Kahhal), was an Iranian ophthalmologist, publisher and journalist. She founded and headed Danesh, the first periodical published specifically for women in Iran. The weekly appeared in Tehran from September 1910 to July 1911 and produced thirty issues.

Historians of medicine have described Kahhal as the first woman known to have practised ophthalmology in Iran. Her medical work and her publication of articles on hygiene, women's health and childcare also made her an early figure in Iranian medical journalism.

== Name and family ==
Kahhal was usually identified in contemporary records by her professional title rather than by her personal name. Earlier accounts variously called her Ma'sumeh or Somayyeh Kahhal. According to information supplied by the filmmaker Khosrow Sinai, who identified her as his grandmother, her name was Effat Sayyah Sepanlou. The scholarly transliteration ʿIffat Sayyāḥ Sipānlū has also been used.

In the first issue of Danesh, she described herself as the daughter of the late Mirza Mohammad Hakim-Bashi Jadid al-Islam Hamedani. The title hakim-bashi identified her father as a physician or senior medical practitioner, while Jadid al-Islam indicated that he had converted to Islam.

The Persian and Arabic word kahhal historically referred to a practitioner who treated diseases of the eye. It became part of her professional name and was rendered in contemporary Persian as Khanom-e Doctor Kahhal.

Some early accounts identified her as the wife of Hossein Khan Kahhal, an ophthalmologist and editor of the newspaper Esteqlal-e Iran. Other historians rejected this identification and stated that the connection between the two was professional rather than familial, since both practised ophthalmology. The available evidence does not establish the marriage with certainty.

== Medical training and practice ==
Accounts of Kahhal's education state that she first acquired basic medical knowledge from her father. She later attended a girls’ school operated by American missionaries in Tehran, where she studied medicine and reportedly received permission to practise.

She established an ophthalmological practice on Jalilabad Street in Tehran. An advertisement published in Danesh announced that she received patients with eye disorders every morning except Fridays.

Her professional status was questioned by some early historians, who argued that she had acquired the title “doctor” through her supposed marriage to Hossein Khan Kahhal. Medical historians have pointed to the advertisement for her clinic, her detailed medical writing and her knowledge of hygiene and childcare as evidence that she practised ophthalmology independently.

In 2020, researchers published documents from the National Library and Archives of Iran, including a photograph of Kahhal in the office of Danesh, the official publication permit and the legal undertaking connected with the journal. The photograph shows her beside her son, Abbas Masum, who assisted with the publication.

== Danesh ==
Kahhal obtained permission to publish Danesh in 1910. A letter dated 31 August 1910, issued by Morteza Qoli Khan Hedayat in his capacity as minister responsible for education, endowments and public benefits, authorised its publication. A related legal undertaking was dated 1 September.

The first issue appeared on 10 Ramadan 1328 AH, corresponding to 15 September 1910. The journal continued until 27 Rajab 1329 AH, or 23 July 1911, when its thirtieth and final issue was published. Its office was situated on Ala al-Dawla Street, now part of Ferdowsi Street in Tehran.

Kahhal remained the head and proprietor of the journal throughout its existence. Issues two through four listed a person whose name was printed as “A. Safvat” as editor-in-chief, although Kahhal continued to direct the publication.

Danesh was a weekly publication generally consisting of eight pages. Its masthead described it as a journal concerned with morality, household management, childcare and marital relations and stated that it would not discuss national politics.

=== Women's education ===
In the editorial of the first issue, Kahhal argued that mothers were responsible for the early intellectual and moral formation of children and therefore needed to be educated. She supported this position with religious sayings that presented the acquisition of knowledge as an obligation for both women and men.

The journal encouraged women who could not read to learn and advised educated husbands to read its articles aloud to their wives. It treated newspapers as a means through which women could acquire knowledge outside the limited number of girls’ schools then operating in Tehran.

The educational programme of Danesh has been described as moderate or maternalist. It promoted women's literacy largely by presenting educated women as more capable mothers and wives rather than by framing education solely as an individual right. Nevertheless, it supported women's employment and argued that educated wives were entitled to greater respect within marriage.

=== Marriage and social questions ===
Articles in Danesh discussed relations between husbands and wives, household responsibilities and the treatment of women within marriage. Although the journal accepted the conventional family structure of its time, it encouraged marriages based on mutual affection, consultation and respect.

The journal also addressed arranged marriage, the harassment of women in public places and the condition of abandoned children. Its treatment of these subjects remained reformist rather than confrontational, and it avoided direct involvement in party politics.

=== Medicine and hygiene ===
Medical and hygienic instruction formed a substantial part of the journal. Articles dealt with the health and nutrition of children, disease prevention during cholera outbreaks, women's health, dental care and the physical and moral upbringing of children from birth.

Kahhal also introduced readers to developments in medicine and science outside Iran. The journal referred to subjects such as incubators and radiology and discussed the work of Marie Curie. Its medical articles were directed principally toward women responsible for the health of children and other members of the household.

== Closure and later life ==
Danesh ceased publication after its thirtieth issue in July 1911. The precise reason for its closure is unknown, although financial difficulties and the limited number of literate women able to subscribe to the journal have been proposed as possible causes.

Little reliable information has been published about Kahhal's activities after the closure of the journal. According to family information reported by later researchers, she died in the Solar Hijri year 1344, corresponding to 1965–1966, at the age of eighty-four.

== Legacy ==
The establishment of Danesh marked the beginning of the women's periodical press in Iran. Although its programme was less politically radical than those of some later women's publications, it introduced women's education, health, marriage and employment as subjects for regular public discussion.

The journal preceded publications such as Shokufeh, edited by Maryam Amid-Semnani, and Zaban-e Zanan, founded by Sediqeh Dowlatabadi. Scholars have described Danesh as an early basis for the more explicitly feminist discourse that developed in the Iranian press during subsequent decades.

Kahhal's clinic and medical writings also provide early evidence of a woman practising ophthalmology in Iran before women were widely admitted to formal medical education. For this reason, studies of the history of Iranian medicine generally identify her as the country's first woman ophthalmologist.

== See also ==
- Women in Iran
- Women's rights movement in Iran
