= Languages of Iran =

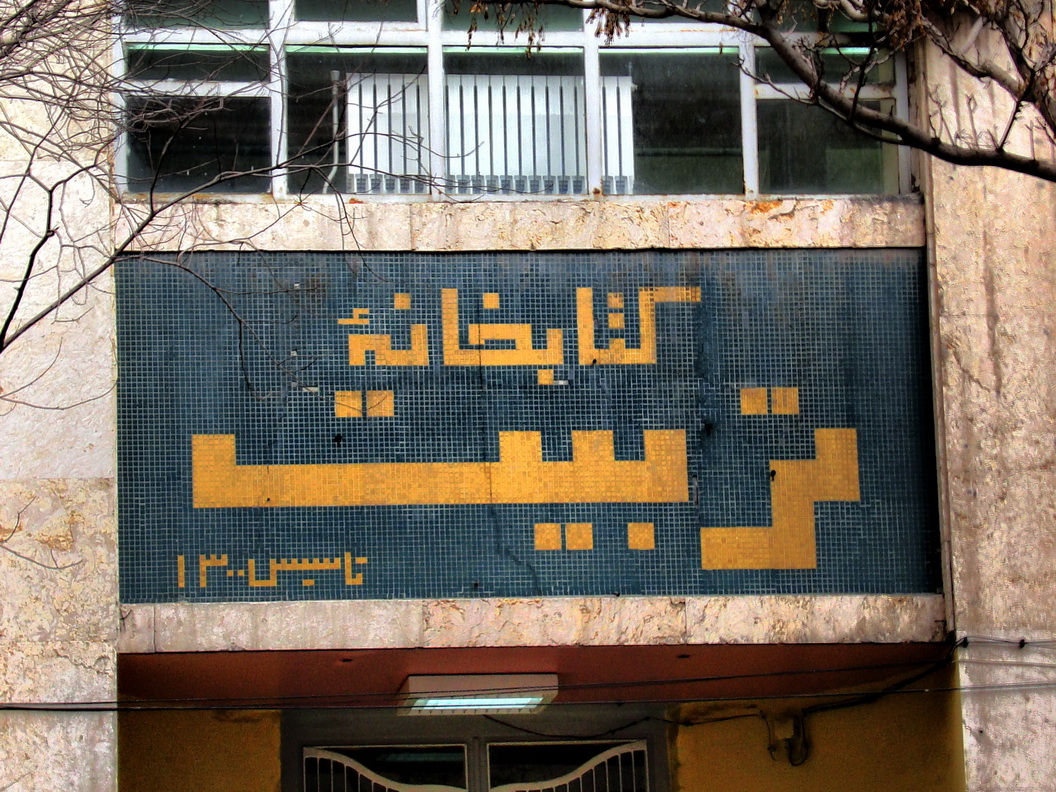
- Persian sign at the Tarbiyat library in Tabriz
- Official: Persian
- Main: Persian 63.3%, Azeri Turkic (and its dialects) 13%, Kurdish 7%, Gilaki 3.6%, Mazandarani (or Tabari) 3%, Arabic 1.8%, other languages (including Luri and Balochi) 8.3%
- Minority: Armenian, Georgian, Circassian, Hebrew, and Assyrian
- Foreign: English, Russian, French
- Signed: Persian Sign Language
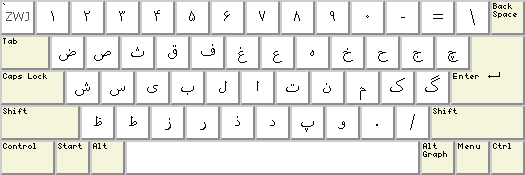
- Keyboard layout: ISIRI 9147

Iran's ethnic diversity means that the languages of Iran come from a number of linguistic origins, although the primary language spoken and used is Persian. The Constitution of the Islamic Republic of Iran asserts that the Persian language alone must be used for schooling and for all official government communications. The constitution also recognizes Arabic as the language of Islam, and assigns it formal status as the language of religion. Although multilingualism is not encouraged, the use of minority languages is permitted in the course of teaching minority-language literature. Different publications have reported different statistics for the languages of Iran; however, the top three languages spoken are consistently reported as Persian, Azeri and Kurdish.

== Language policy and planning of Iran ==
The current language policy of Iran is addressed in Chapter Two of the Constitution of the Islamic Republic of Iran (Articles 15 & 16). It asserts that the Persian language is the lingua franca of the Iranian nation and as such, required for the school system and for all official government communications. In addition, the constitution recognizes the Arabic language as the language of Islam, giving it formal status as the language of religion and regulating its spread within the Iranian national curriculum.

Due to the nation's social and ethnic diversity, the constitution also acknowledges and permits the use of minority languages in the mass media as well as within the schools, in order to teach minority-language literature. The minority languages of Iran do not receive formal status and are not officially regulated by the authorities.

The first legislation which granted the Persian language its status was initiated by Qajar dynasty in 1906, as part of an electoral law that positioned it as the official language of the state of Iran, its government, its political institutions and its legal system. Over time, this enactment was followed by others, which eventually led to a monolingual policy by the Iranian regime.

Perceiving multilingualism as a threat to the nation's unity and territorial integrity, and seeing the need to restrict minority languages’ use and to advance the Persian language's hegemony, Iran's language policy consists of a non-translation outline as well: all government, administration and educational settings are obliged to use only Persian for any written communication. This applies to political institutions (i.e. the Iranian Parliament), official bureaucratic communication (forms, signage etc.) and schooling (all children from the age of six are exposed only to Persian as the language of teaching and learning and of textbooks within the public school system). In other words, the Iranian authorities hold that minorities need to learn the Iranian vernacular to an extent that will allow them to communicate with state institutions.

Among the institutions accountable for advancing Iranian Language Planning (e.g. Ministry of Education and Ministry of Science, Research and Technology) is the Academy of Persian Language and Literature, which was established on 1935, under Reza Shah Pahlavi. Constantly seeking to revise and elaborate the nation's official language, this institute focuses on the linguistics of the Persian language and on the internal aspects of Language Planning, rather than on the use of minority languages within Iranian society. Other Language Planning aspects (e.g. sociolinguistic or functional literacy) have not been assigned to a formal institute and are currently handled free of any official master plan by the educational ministries.

== Languages of Iran ==
Different publications have reported different statistics for the languages of Iran. There have been some limited censuses taken in Iran in 2001, 1991, 1986 and 1949–1954. The following are the languages with the greatest number of speakers (data from the CIA World Factbook):

Classification categories of the spoken languages:

- Indo-European (Iranic mainly, smaller amounts of other branches represented mainly by Armenian, amongst others)
- Turkic (mainly Azerbaijani, with smaller amounts of Turkmen, Qashqai)
- Semitic (mainly Arabic, but also Neo-Aramaic, Hebrew, and Mandean)
- Kartvelian (such as Georgian)
- North Caucasian (Circassian)

== Census in the 1990s ==
A census was taken in the Iranian month of Mordad (July – August 21) in 1991. In this census, all 49,588 mothers who gave birth in the country were issued birth certificates and asked about their mother-tongue. They reported: 50.2% Persian, 20.6% Azerbaijani, 10% Kurdish, 8.9% Luri, 7.2% Gilaki and Mazandarani, 3.5% Arabic, 2.7% Baluchi, 0.6% Turkmen, 0.1% Armenian, and 0.2% Others (e.g. Circassian, Georgian, etc.). The local dialect of Arabic spoken in Iran is Khuzestani Arabic, but the varieties of Arabic taught across Iran to students in secondary schools, regardless of their ethnic or linguistic background, are Modern Standard Arabic and Classical Arabic, the latter a liturgical language of Islam.

== Academic estimates ==
According to recent scientific papers, the following languages have the highest number of speakers in Iran: Persian, 63.3%; Azeri Turkic (and its dialects), 13%; Kurdish, 7%; Gilaki, 3.6%; Mazandarani (or Tabari), 3%; Arabic, 1.8%; other languages (including Lorish and Balochi), 8.3%.

== Foreign languages taught in schools ==
=== English ===
English is taught in secondary schools (first and second high school) and some non-governmental and public schools as an extra-curricular subject.

As of 2023, according to an official of the Iranian Ministry of Education, students were no longer required to learn English, downgrading the language to the optional level.

The language was banned in 2018, before the larger ban in 2023, from being taught in primary schools, with the subject being called a "cultural invasion".

=== Arabic ===
Arabic, being recognised as the language of Islam in the Constitution of Iran, was taught alongside English, for religious purposes throughout kindergarten and primary school, until 2023.

Following the 2023 ban on languages besides Persian being taught in all kindergarten and primary schools, Arabic has been taught only throughout secondary school (grades 7–12).

As of October 2023, Iran has banned the teaching of foreign languages, including Arabic, in all primary and kindergarten schools. The ban is intended to help preserve Iranian identity in children at a young age.

The Arabic taught in schools is Modern Standard Arabic and Classical Arabic, which is used in Islamic liturgy.

=== Additional languages ===
A number of foreign languages are taught in Iran, optionally. The languages vary on the choice of the school and students.

French, German, Italian, Russian, Spanish and, more recently, Mandarin Chinese are allowed as additional languages based on choices made by schools and students.

In recent years, some government officials have also suggested that instead of English, the teaching of Russian, Chinese and German languages should be supported in Iran.

The addition of Mandarin Chinese as an optional subject took place in July 2023. The law adding Chinese to the list of foreign languages that can be taught in Iranian middle and high schools was endorsed by the then President of Iran, Ebrahim Raisi.

== Other estimates ==
In 1986, a nationwide census was undertaken to determine the percentage of Iranians that know Persian, those who do not know, and those who know it fluently.

== Languages by number of native speakers ==
The following is a list of languages spoken in Iran by number of native speakers according to the latest Ethnologue edition in 2025.

Rank	Language	Speakers in Iran
1	Iranian Persian	61,500,000
2	Azeri	10,100,000
3	Luri (& Bakhtiari)	5,130,000
4	Kurdish	5,110,000
5	Gilaki	1,610,000
6	Balochi	1,450,000
7	Mazandarani	1,350,000
8	Southern Pashto	1,270,000
9	Dari	1,200,000
10	Qashqai	1,020,000
11	Khorasani Turkish	960,000
12	Laki	680,000
13	Mesopotamian Arabic	571,000
14	Turkmen	359,000
15	Armenian	340,000
16	Hazaragi	337,000
17	Hawrami	180,000
18	Assyrian Neo-Aramaic	117,000
19	Southwestern Fars	113,000
20	Gulf Arabic	110,000
21	Other languages	2,048,000

== Gamaan Survey (languages spoken at home) ==
Rank	Language	September 2025	June 2024	February 2024	July 2023
1	Iranian Persian	68.4%	67.1%	68.5%	68.2%
2	Azeri	11.6%	12.0%	11.3%	10.6%
3	Kurdish	5.0%	5.5%	5.7%	5.2%
4	Luri (& Bakhtiari)	4.5%	4.9%	4.3%	4.0%
5	Gilaki	1.4%	1.7%	1.8%	1.7%
6	Mazandarani	1.5%	1.7%	1.5%	1.4%
7	Laki	1.0%	1.1%	0.9%	0.9%
8	Balochi	1.3%	1.3%	1.4%	2.0%
9	Arabic	0.8%	1.0%	0.9%	0.9%
10	Dari	0.2%	0.2%	0.2%	0.4%
11	Qashqai	0.5%	0.4%	0.4%	0.5%
12	Turkmeni	0.4%	0.4%	0.4%	0.4%
13	Armeni	0.1%	0.1%	0.1%	0.1%
14	Lari/Achomi	0.4%	0.4%	0.4%	0.4%
15	Other languages	2.9%	2.2%	2.2%	3.3%

== See also ==
- Demographics of Iran
- Ethnicities in Iran
- Iranian languages
