= Hüseyin Rahmi Gürpınar Museum =

Museum in Istanbul

- Hüseyin Rahmi Gürpınar Müzesi
- Location of the museum in Istanbul
- Established: 2000; 26 years ago
- Location: Heybeliada, Princes' Islands, Istanbul, Turkey
- Coordinates: 40°52′37″N 29°05′32″E
- Type: Historic house

Hüseyin Rahmi Gürpınar Museum (Turkish: Hüseyin Rahmi Gürpınar Müzesi) is a historic house museum dedicated to the writer Hüseyin Rahmi Gürpınar in Istanbul, Turkey.

The museum is situated on Heybeliada in the Princes' Islands in Istanbul.

Hüseyin Rahmi Gürpınar (1864–1944) was a writer specialized in daily life of Istanbul, mostly in a humorous way. During the 1912-1944 period, he lived on Heybeliada. His house is situated on top of a hill overlooking the Marmara Sea. After his death, the house was handed over to various museum authorities with the intention of establishing a historic house museum. For over half a century, it was neglected. Finally, the building was converted into a museum by the Ministry of Culture and Tourism with the support of Adalar Municipality. It was opened to visits in 2000.

In 2013, Istanbul Metropolitan Municipality tried to convert the museum into a training center. Upon public protests, its status remained unchanged. Currently, the museum is under restoration.
