= Nashriyah =

Nashriyah: Digital Iranian History
- Website type: Digital library
- Available in: English
- Country of origin: United Kingdom
- Owner: University of Manchester Library
- Commercial: No
- Registration: No
- Launched: 1 February 2016; 10 years ago
- Current status: Active

Access
- Cost: Free

Coverage
- Record depth: Full-text
- Format coverage: Newspapers and magazines
- Temporal coverage: Mainly 1951–1953; 1975–1981
- Geospatial coverage: Iran
- No. of records: +12,000 pages

Links
- Website: Nashriyah

Nashriyah (lit. 'Publication' in Persian) is the name of a freely-available digital collection of Iranian print media, created and maintained by the University of Manchester Library. The project was launched in 2016 after two years of digitization works, and mainly includes newspapers and magazines published during the 1950s, as well as the late 1970s. Though the archive misses a large number of important periodicals and some of its collections are incomplete, it has made rare publications available for the first time.

== Archive ==
The archive currently covers two periods of the Mohammad Mosaddegh administration and the Iranian Revolution.

=== The 1950s collection ===
- Iran-e Bastan (101 issues, 1933–1935)
- Khak va Khun (139 issues, 1965–1966)
- Mardom-e Iran (50 issues, 1952–1953)
- Elm va Zendegi (9 issues, 1959–1961)
- Nabard-e Zendegi (15 issues, 1952–1953)
- Niru-ye Sevvom (129 issues, 1953)
- Shouresh (40 issues, 1951–1953)
- Tehran-e-Mosavvar (126 issues, 1952–1955)

=== The 1979 Revolution collection ===
- Rastakhiz (234 issues, 1975–1978)
- Rastakhiz-e Kargaran (26 issues, 1975–1976)
- Andisheha-ye Rastakhiz (6 issues, 1976–1978)
- Kayhan (723 issues, 1979–1981)
- Ayandegan (157 issues, 1979)
- Parkhash (full archive, 1979)
- Mojahed (195 issues, 1979–1984)
- Rah-e Mojahed (69 issues, 1981–1992)
- Peygham-e Emrouz (91 issues, 1979)
- Pirouzi (4 issues, 1980)
- Rah-e Kargar (5 issues, 1983–1987)
- Ommat (full archive, 1979–1981)
- Jonbesh (83 issues, 1977–1980)
- Parkhash (full archive, 1979)
- Tehran-e Mosavvar (34 issues, 1978–1979)
- Shora-ye Nevisandegan (6 issues, 1980–1982)
- Sepid va Siah (34 issues, 1978–1979)
- Ahangar (full archive, 1979)
- Javanan-e Emrouz (41 issues, 1979)
- Ettehad-e Javan (9 issues, 1979)
- Ettehad-e Mardom (117 issues, 1979–1982)
- Sogand (22 issues, 1979)
- Ferdowsi (30 issues, 1978–1979)
- Farda-ye Iran (10 issues, 1980–1982)

== See also ==
- Project Translatio
- List of digital library projects
