= At-Tabib =

Magazine published between 1884 and 1888

aṭ-Ṭabīb
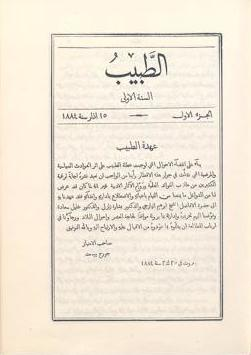
- Editor: Ibrahīm Al-Yāziǧī
- Categories: literature, science, language, medicine
- Frequency: Biweekly
- Publisher: Ibrahīm Al-Yāziǧī; Bišāra Zalzal; Ḫalīl Saʿāda
- First issue: 15 March 1884
- Final issue: 28 February 1885
- Country: Lebanon
- Based in: Beirut
- Language: Arabic

The journal At-Tabib (“The doctor“) was edited between 1884 and 1885 by the Lebanese linguist and journalist Ibrāhīm al-Yāziǧī (1847-1906) as well as by Bišāra Zalzal (1851-1905) and Ḫalīl Saʿāda. In total, they published 24 numbers in one year in Beirut, coming out every two weeks. The predecessor of At-Tabib, Ahbār Tibbiya (“medical notifications”), had already been founded in 1874 by George E. Post (1838-1909). Being a member of the American Mission in Beirut as well as a professor at the Medical School of the Syrian Protestant College (nowadays the American University of Beirut, AUB), post created a medical journal for the College's students. After taking over the post of editor in chief, al-Yāziǧī changed it into an encyclopedic educational publication that now bore the subtitle Maǧalla ṭibbīya ʿilmīya ṣināʿīya and was guided by the examples of Al-Jinan and Al-Muqtataf. The content of its articles was medical, scientific, literary and linguistic. Even though he failed with At-Tabib, it was only some years later that al-Yāziǧī published two other periodicals in Cairo: Al Bayan and Ad-Diya.

Al-Tabib was republished in 1895 and until 1914 by Iskandar al-Baroudi.
