= Boşboğaz ile güllabi =

Ottoman satirical magazine

- Editor: Hüseyin Rahmi Gürpınar; Ahmet Rasim
- Categories: Satire
- Frequency: Twice weekly
- Founded: 1908
- Final issue: 1908
- Based in: Istanbul
- Language: Ottoman Turkish
- Website: Boşboğaz ile güllabi

Boşboğaz ile güllabi (DMG: Āšiyān; English: "The Gabbler and the Asylum Guard"), is an Ottoman satirical magazine was published twice a week from 6 August to 14 December 1908 in Istanbul by Hüseyin Rahmi Gürpınar (1864-1944) and Ahmet Rasim (1864-1932) in a total of 36 issues.

The articles of the magazine contained original and fine jokes and satire. In addition to various writings, it also contained caricatures of famous people of the time and jokes about the magazine Mizan. Among other things the caricatures related to the annexation of Bosnia and Herzegovina. Some of the humorous articles were published in series and the articles were written in simple language and in a linguistic style appropriate to the period. In addition, Boşboğaz ile güllabi contained daily news and serious articles that appeared under the name "Boşboğazın ciddî makalesi" ("Serious Boşboğaz Articles").

Apart from the signed articles, there were many anonymously written articles in the magazine. It is possible to trace them back to Hüseyin Rahmi because of the same writing style. Due to his critical style, he took over the administration of the magazine, which was published several times by the Ottoman government. Another famous writer besides Hüseyin Rahmi Gürpınar and Ahmet Rasim was Mithat Cemal Kuntay (1885-1956).
