= Zaban-e Zanan =

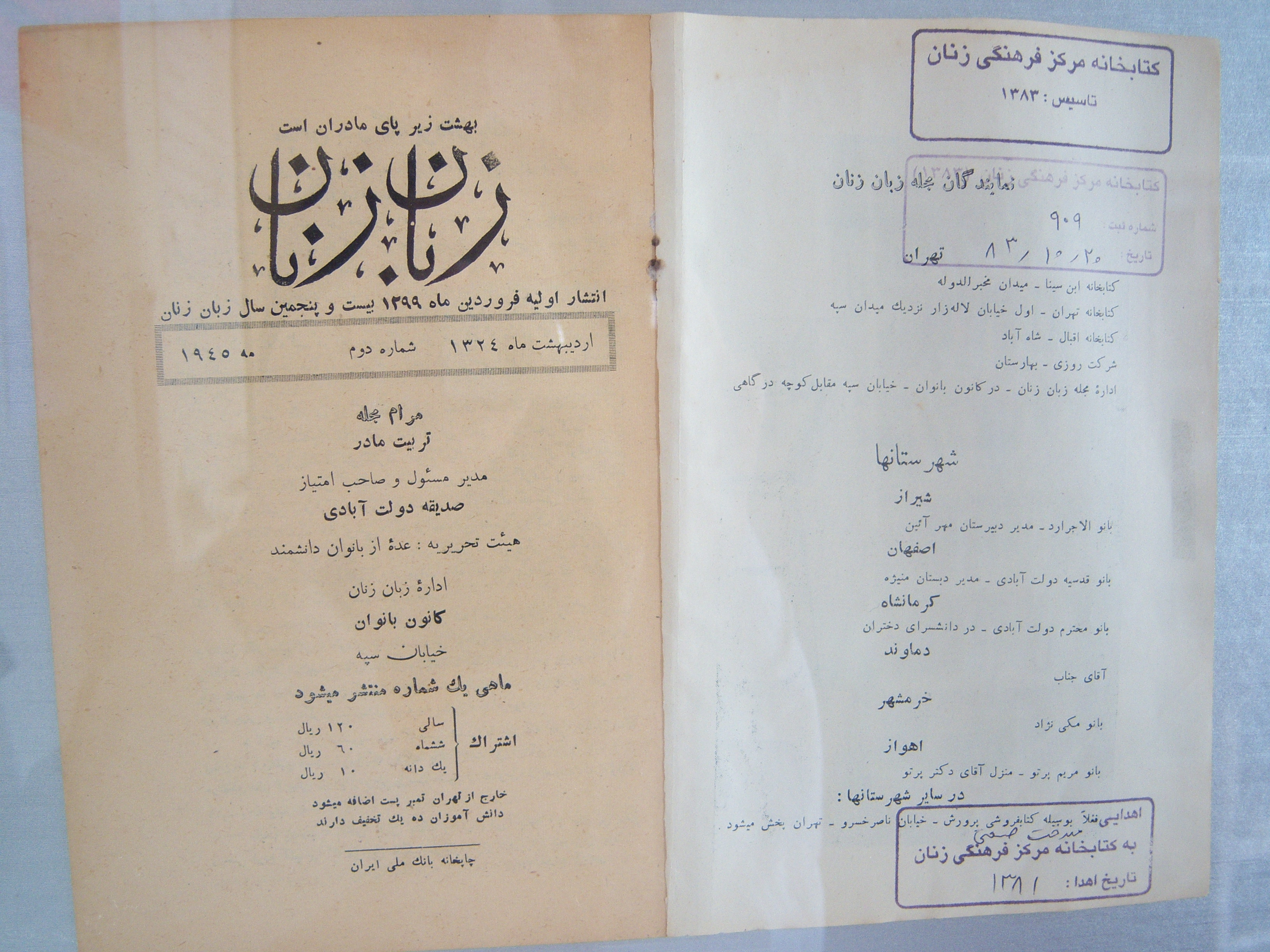
- Editor: Sediqeh Dowlatabadi
- Categories: Women's magazine
- Frequency: Weekly
- Founder: Sediqeh Dowlatabadi
- First issue: 18 July 1919
- Final issue: 1 January 1921
- Country: Iran
- Based in: Isfahan

Zaban-e Zanan (Persian: زبان زنان, lit. 'Women's Voice'; ; also Romanized as Zabān-e Zanān) was a Persian-language radical women's periodical, published in Isfahan, Iran, from 18 July 1919 until 1 January 1921, and edited by activist Sediqeh Dowlatabadi.

== History and profile ==
In 1919 teacher and activist Sediqeh Dowlatabadi founded the magazine Zaban-e Zanan. It was the third women's magazine to be published in Iran, and the first to be published outside Tehran - it was published in Isfahan. It was preceded by: Danesh (Knowledge) published from 1910; Shokufeh (Blossom) published from 1913. The first issue was published on 18 July 1919 and started as a bi-weekly periodical. Each issue was four pages long. However, due to demand it moved to weekly publication. It only published submissions from women and girls. The magazine was forced to close on 1 January 1921, due to its anti-British stance.

== Reception ==
From the outset, Dowlatabadi set out to create articles which would challenge "backwardness and feeble-mindedness" surrounding women's rights in Isfahan. The publication explicitly advocated for 'Unveiling' of women in Iran. As a result of this stance, the publication was attacked in other news outlets, and the premises were physically attacked with stones and with firearms. The magazine ended up being produced under police protection. Two years after its publication, it was banned for 13 months due to the explicitly anticolonial editorial of Dowlatabadi.

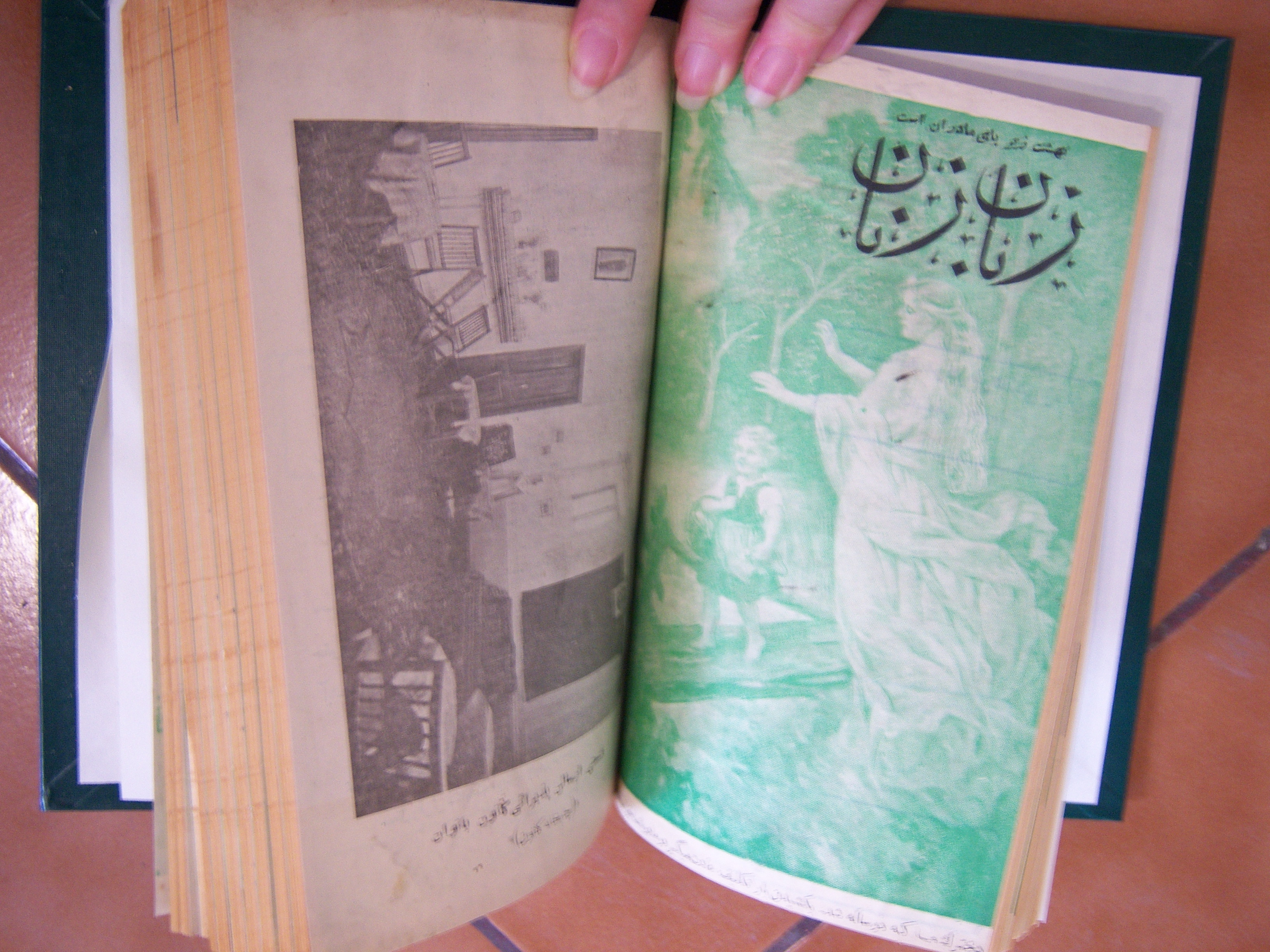
Zaban e zanan 1945

In 1921, Dowlatabadi moved to Tehran and re-established the magazine there. This iteration was under the same name, but published as a monthly 48-page magazine. This second edition was influential and gives insight into the lives of women in Iran across several decades.

== Legacy ==
In 2016, Zaban-e Zanan and Dowlatabadi's archives were the subject of an exhibition curated by Azadeh Fatehrad.
