= Al-Bayan (journal) =

Al-Bayān
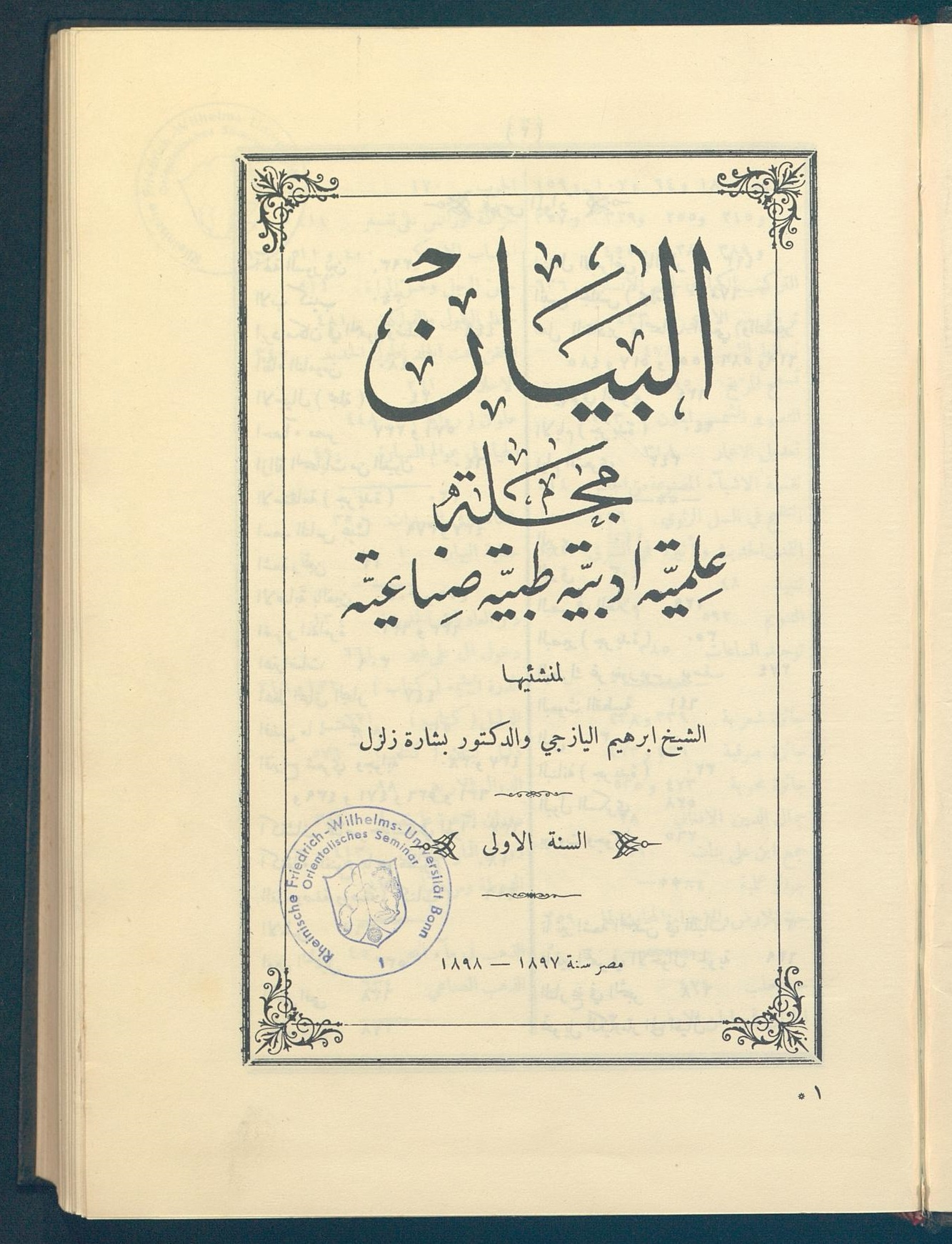
- Editor: Ibrahīm Al-Yāziǧī
- Categories: Culture, anthropology, language, education
- Frequency: Once to twice per month
- Publisher: Ibrahīm Al-Yāziǧī and Bišāra Zalzal
- First issue: 1 March 1897
- Final issue: 16 August 1898
- Country: Egypt
- Based in: Cairo
- Language: Arabic
- Website: nbn-resolving.de/urn:nbn:de:hbz:5:1-68616%20Al-Bayān

The Arabic periodical al-Bayān ('announcement' or 'declaration') was published once or twice a month from 1 March 1897 until 16 August 1898. It was edited in Cairo by Ibrahīm Al-Yāziǧī (1847–1906) and Bišāra Zalzal (1851–1905) and was the successor of the medical journal aṭ-Ṭabīb (1884–1885). Since 1898, Al-Yāziǧī, a linguist and journalist from Lebanon, particularly built up his reputation as the chief editor of the journal aḍ-Ḍiyāʾ (1898–1906). Apart from scientific articles, al-Bayān focused on cultural and anthropological topics such as language and education.
