= Ad-Dunya al-Musawwara =

Literary magazine in Egypt (1929–1932)

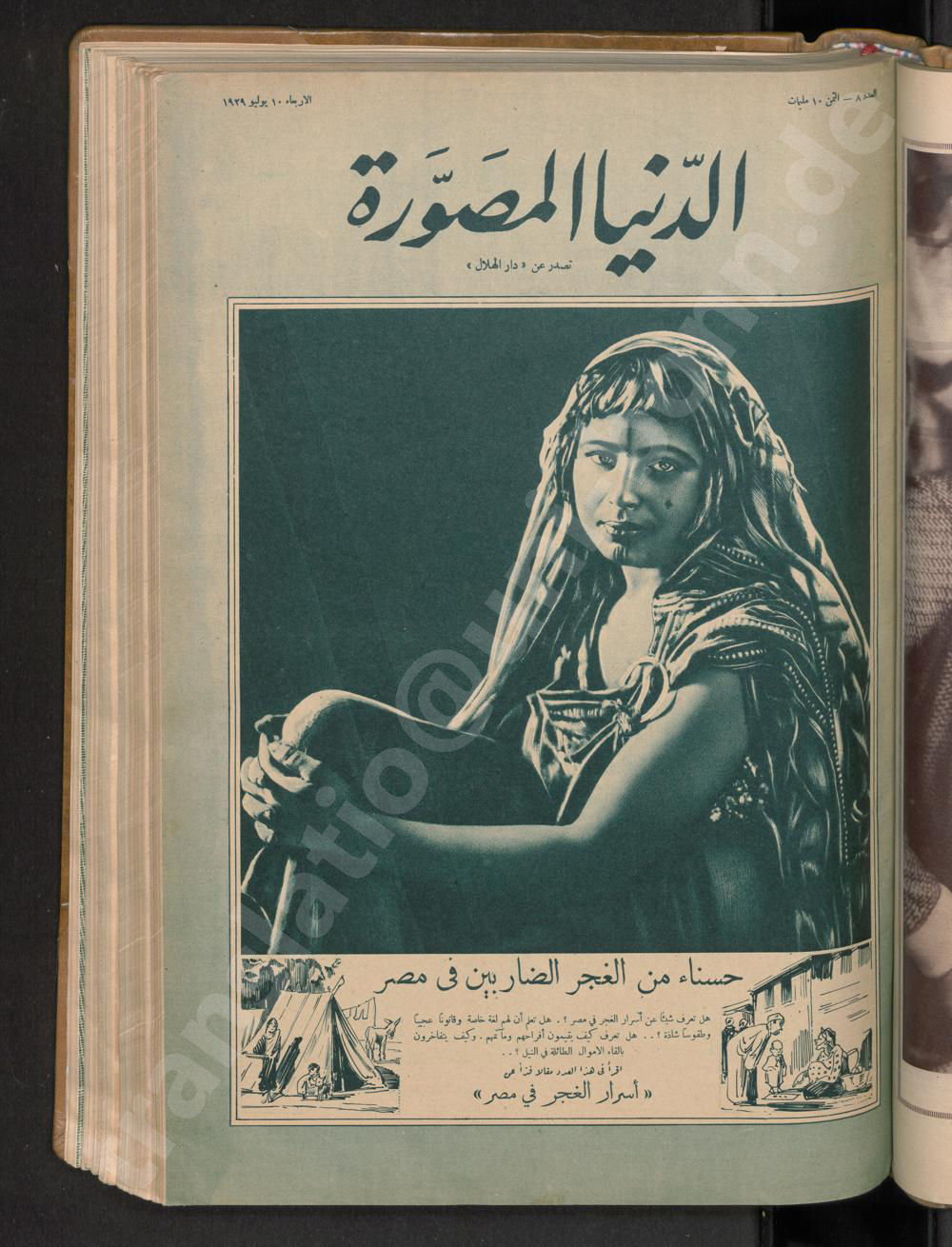
- Categories: Literature, Poetry, Philology
- Frequency: Weekly
- Publisher: Dar al-Hilal
- Founded: 1929
- Final issue Number: 1932; 228
- Country: Egypt
- Based in: Cairo
- Language: Arabic
- Website: ad-Dunyā 'l-Muṣawwara

The Arabic language magazine ad-Dunya al-Musawwara (Arabic: الدنيا المصوّرة; DMG: ad-Dunyā 'l-Muṣawwara; English: "The World of Illustration") was published between 1929 and 1932 in Cairo, Egypt. It was released by the well-known publishing house Dar al-Hilal that was also responsible for the publications of al-Fukaha, Kull Shayʾ and Al Musawwar. The magazine consisted of seven volumes with a total of 228 issues which were published weekly.

The magazine did not only focus on Egyptian and international events, but also illustrations pursuing a cultural focus. A considerable number of cartoons, photographs and high-quality illustrations increased the readership vastly, even among illiterates. In the course of this novel phase regarding the Egyptian media landscape, al-Dunya al-Musawwara seized on new topics, such as fashion, sports, culture, and tourism, and offered a great commercial platform to popular products of that time.
