= Nasif al-Yaziji =

Lebanese writer

- ناصيف اليازجي
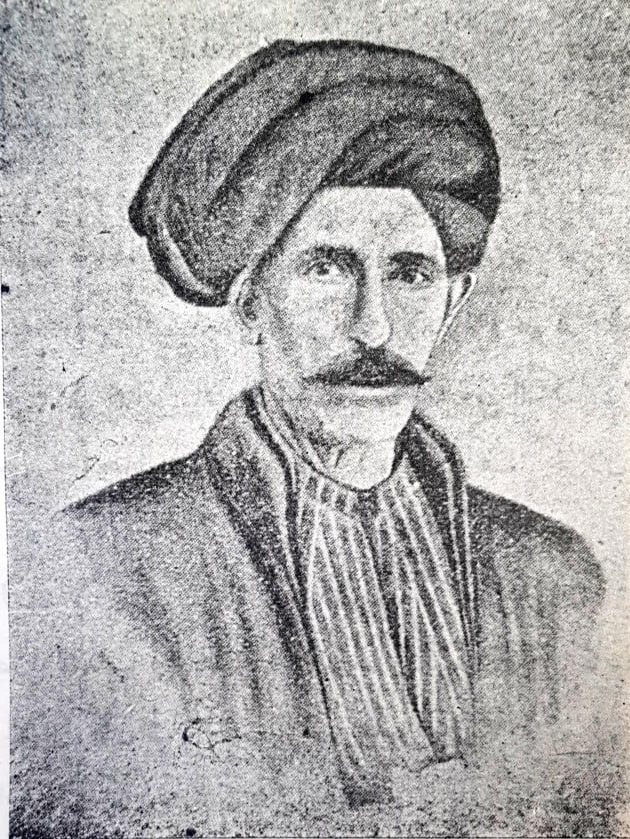
- Born: Nāṣīf bin ʻAbd Allāh bin Nāṣīf bin Janbulāṭ bin Saʻd al-Yāzijī; March 25, 1800; Kfarshima, Emirate of Mount Lebanon (under suzerainty of the Ottoman Empire)
- Died: February 8, 1871 (aged 70); Ottoman Empire
- Occupation: Author
- Movement: Nahda
- Children: Ibrahim al-Yaziji

Nāṣīf bin ʻAbd Allāh bin Nāṣīf bin Janbulāṭ bin Saʻd al-Yāzijī (Arabic: ناصيف بن عبد الله بن ناصيف بن جنبلاط بن سعد اليازجي; March 25, 1800 – February 8, 1871) was an author at the times of the Ottoman Empire and father of Ibrahim al-Yaziji. He was one of the leading figures in the Nahda movement.

Like several figures of the Nahda, Nasif al-Yaziji migrated from a Mount Lebanon ravaged by discord and revolt, to Beirut at a time when the city was undergoing rapid development and establishing itself as a centre of academia and journalism.

== Life ==
A Greek Catholic, born in Kfarshima to a prominent family originally from Homs (modern Syria). He began his career as a private secretary (mudabbir) – a common way for Christians to attain social mobility under the restrictive iqta' system by which Mount Lebanon, which he described as "a country of tribes", was governed.

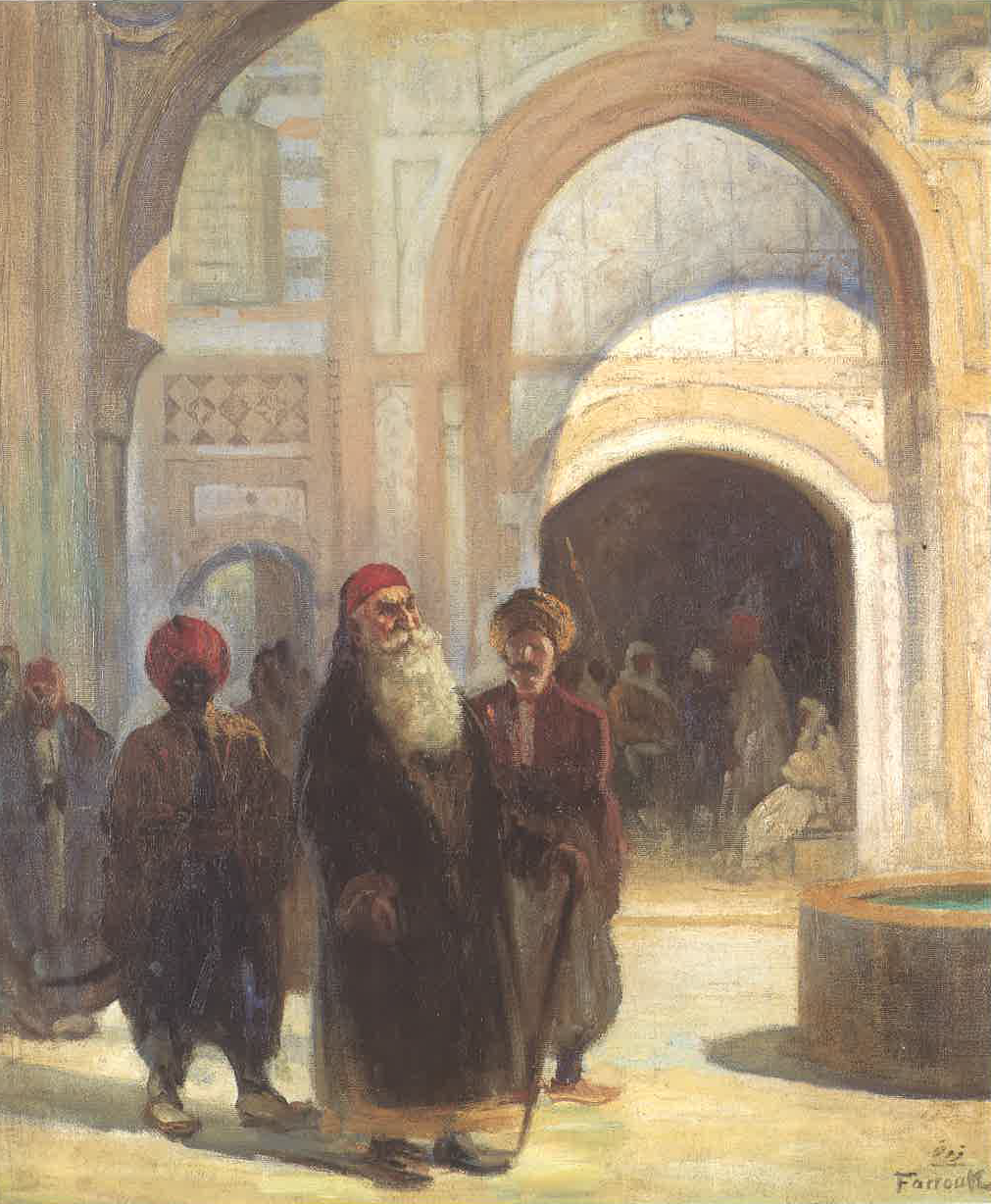
Bashir Shihab II and Nasif al-Yaziji at Beiteddine Palace

First employed by Prince Haydar al-Shihabi, he went on to work for Bashir Shihab II.

When Yaziji moved to Beirut in 1840, he became an Arabic tutor and it was in this role that he came into contact with American and British Protestant missionaries. He would help fulfil one of the greatest ambitions of the missionaries – conduct a Protestant translation of the Bible into Arabic – when he corrected a translation that Eli Smith, an American missionary, and Butrus al-Bustani started in 1847.

After that, he taught at the Syrian Protestant College (later renamed the American University of Beirut) and wrote on poetry, rhetoric, grammar and philosophy. It was for his attempts to emulate the style of classical Arab writers, thereby rediscovering the literary heritage of the Arabs, that he is best known.

Among his works is a treatise on the muqata'ah system. Used by the Ottomans to govern the emirate of Mount Lebanon, this involved tax-farming or iqta' rights being given to leading local families. These families enjoyed a degree of autonomy in the running of their region, controlled the land, collected taxes and benefitted from tax exemptions and benefits in exchange for providing the central authorities in Istanbul with revenue and armed men.

With Bustani and Mikhail Mishaqa, al-Yaziji formed the Syrian Association for the Sciences and Arts – the Arab world's first literary society – in 1847. The circle tackled and published its deliberations on themes such as women's rights, history and their fight against superstition.

It was dissolved in 1852 but its inner circle went on to establish the Syrian Scientific Association a few years later. This became a much larger, multi-sectarian society of intellectuals who pushed for Arab independence from the Ottomans.

== Bibliography ==
- Johnson, Michael (2001). All Honourable Men: The Social Origins of War in Lebanon. I.B.Tauris. ISBN 978-1-86064-715-4.
- Meisami, Julie Scott; Paul Starkey (1998). Encyclopedia of Arabic literature. Taylor & Francis. p. 231. ISBN 978-0-415-18571-4.
- Moosa, Matti (1997). The Origins of Modern Arabic Fiction. Lynne Rienner Publishers. ISBN 978-0-89410-684-2.
- Salibi, Kamal S. (2003). A House of Many Mansions: The History of Lebanon Reconsidered. I. B. Tauris & Co. ISBN 9781860649127.
