= Nama-i Farhangistan (magazine) =

1907 Persian-language political magazine

Nāma-i Farhangistān
- Categories: Literature, Linguistics
- Frequency: Monthly
- First issue: 1943
- Final issue: present
- Country: Iran
- Based in: Tehran
- Language: Persian
- Website: Nāma-i farhangistān

Nama-i Farhangistan (Persian: نامه فرهنگستان, lit. 'Writings of the Academy'), is a Persian-language magazine that is published by the Academy of Persian Language and Literature monthly in Tehran, Iran. It was first published between 1943 and 1947 and continued in 1995 to present. A total of 10 issues in 5 volumes were published.

== Description ==
The magazine was the publication organ of the Academy of Iran (pers. Farhangistān-i Īrān), founded in 1935, the predecessor of the Academy for Persian Language and Literature, and thus became an important pioneer for linguistic research and language reforms in the Pahlavi era.

Among the members of the Academy were well-known politicians and diplomats, numerous famous Iranian writers and scholars of that time, such as Abbas Iqbal (1896-1955), the founder of the magazine Yadgar, and Ali-Akbar Dehchoda (1879–1956), the co-founder of the magazine Sur-e Esrafil and author of the Dictionary of Dehkhoda (Loghat-nāme-ye Dehkhodā) – the most important and comprehensive dictionary of the Persian language and literature.

The Academy, whose primary objective was to preserve and protect the Persian language, in particular used the journal for publishing Persian equivalents to replace certain foreign words. From 1995 on the publication organ experienced a quarterly reprint of the same name.
