= Sharafat (magazine) =

Šarāfat
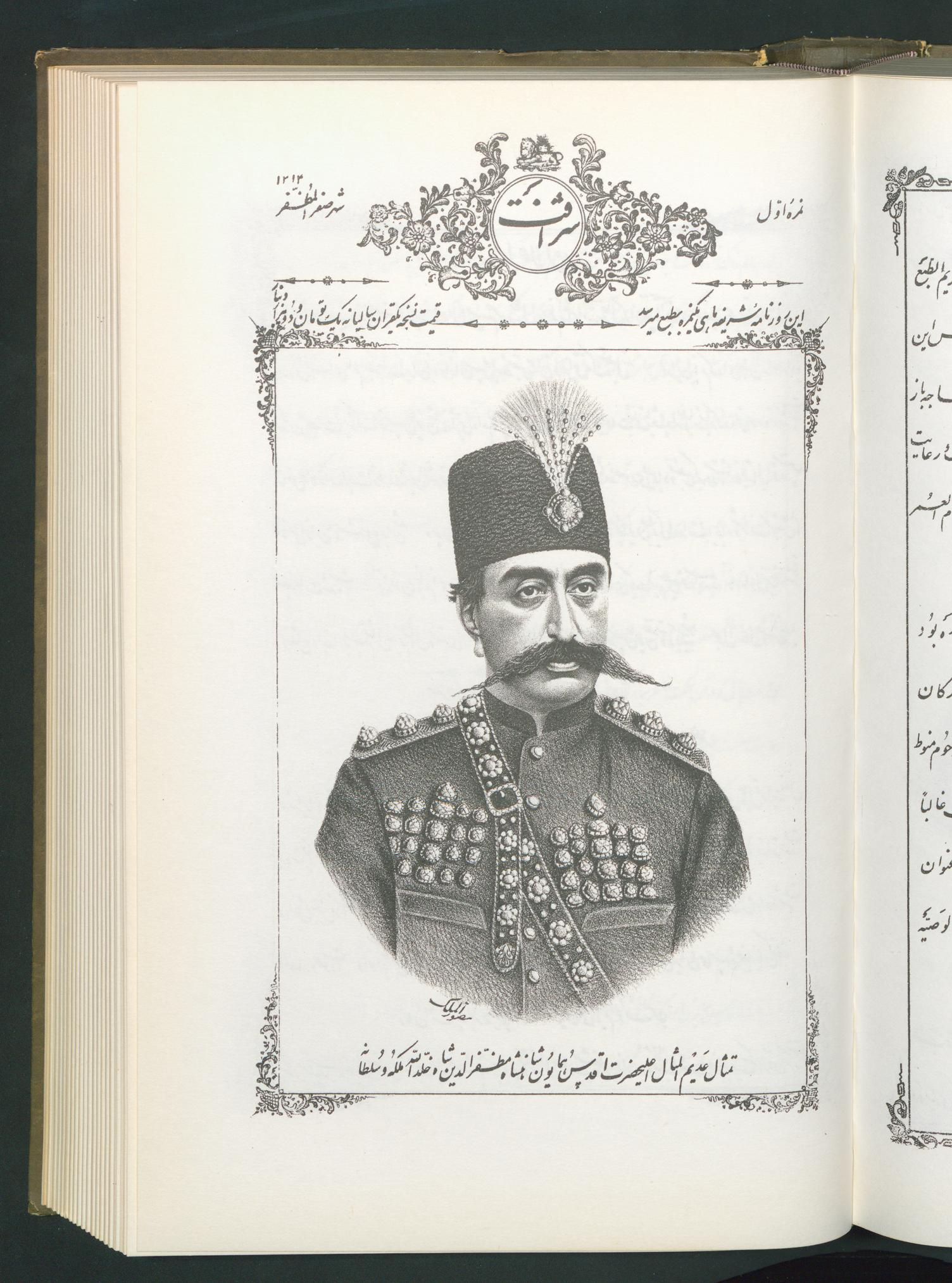
- Editor: Mohammad Bagher Khan
- Frequency: Monthly
- Founded: 1896
- Final issue: 1903
- Country: Iran
- Based in: Tehran
- Language: Persian
- Website: Šarāfat

The monthly magazine Sharafat (Persian: شرافت; DMG: Šarāfat; English: “honour“) was published in Teheran between 1896 and 1903. Under the management of Mohammad Bagher Khan, a minister in the cabinet of Mozaffar-ed-Din Shah, a total of 66 issues were published in one volume. Like Sharaf, as its successor, this magazine was also known for its numerous and elaborate illustrations and photographs. The magazine continued the tradition of Sharaf by focusing on publishing portraits and biographies of well-known Iranian and foreign notables, politicians and artists of that time, supplemented by numerous and elaborate illustrations and photographs. Sharafat changed and revolutionized the art and painting of that time.
