= Ruznama-yi Millati =

Persian-language magazine, published between 1866 and 1870 in Tehran

Rūznāma-i millatī
- Editor: Aliqoli Mirza Qajar
- Frequency: Monthly
- First issue: 1866
- Final issue: 1870
- Country: Iran
- Based in: Tehran
- Language: Persian
- Website: Rūznāma-i millatī

The Persian-language magazine Ruznama-yi Millati (Persian: روزنامه ملتی; translated: The National Journal), was published between 1866 and 1870 in Tehran. It was published monthly in a total of 33 issues. Together with the magazines Ruznama-i Dawlati and the Ruznama-i ʿilmi, Ruznama-yi Millati used to be published under the superintendence of Iʿtizāduʾ s-Salṭana. The upper part of each page showed the figure of a mosque, which displays the national character of the magazine.

Its content focused primarily on the bibliographies of famous poets. A stated goal of the magazine was to move away from the written language of the elite to the spoken language of the masses by adopting a style directed toward communication with the people (mardum).
