= Danesh (women's magazine) =

Persian women's magazine (1910–1911)

Dāneš
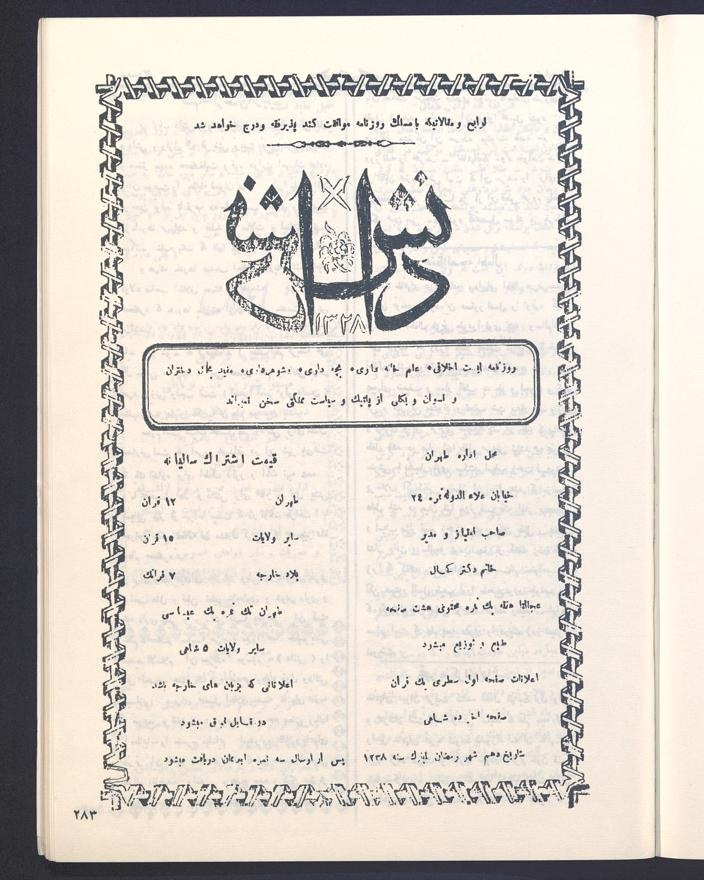
- Editor: Effat Sayyah Sepanlou
- Categories: Women's magazine
- Frequency: Weekly
- Founded: 1910
- Final issue: 1911
- Country: Iran
- Based in: Tehran
- Language: Persian
- Website: Danesh

Danesh (Persian: دانش; DMG: Daneš; lit. 'knowledge') was a Persian-language women's journal which was edited in Tehran, Iran. It was published weekly from 1910 until 1911 in 30 issues.

== History and profile ==
Danesh was founded in Tehran in 1910 and published thirty issues between 15 September 1910 and 23 July 1911. Its publisher and principal organiser was Effat Sayyah Sepanlou (Persian: عفت سیاح سپانلو), an ophthalmologist and journalist better known as Banu Kahal or Dr Kahal.

Older publications identified her only as “Khanom-e Doctor Kahal”, the wife of Hossein Khan Kahal and the daughter of Mohammad Hakim-Bashi Jadid al-Islam, formerly known as Mirza Yaqub. As a result, some later accounts stated that her personal name was unknown. Documents from the family archive of filmmaker Khosrow Sinai, made public in 2019, identified her as Effat Sayyah Sepanlou. The first three issues of Danesh listed A. Safvat as editor-in-chief; no editor-in-chief was named in issues 4–30.

Danesh was the first periodical in Iran published specifically for women. It described itself as an ethical and educational publication and stated that it would not discuss national politics. Its articles dealt primarily with women's education, the health of women and children, child-rearing, household management and marriage. It also published reports about girls' schools and instalments of serialized fiction. The journal's publication schedule later became irregular, and it ceased publication after its thirtieth issue.

Two years after the disestablishment of Danesh another women's magazine, called Shokufeh, was published in Tehran.

== See also ==
- Zaban-e Zanan
