= Iran-e Bastan =

Iranian political magazine (1933–1937)

- Editor: Abdulrahman Saif Azad
- Categories: Political magazine
- Frequency: Weekly
- Founder: Abdulrahman Saif Azad
- Founded: 1933
- First issue: 21 January 1933
- Final issue: 1937
- Country: Iran
- Based in: Tehran
- Language: Persian

Iran-e Bastan (Persian: ایران باستان, lit. 'Ancient Iran'), also known as Nameh-ye Iran Bastan (نامهٔ ایران باستان), was a Persian-language weekly political and news magazine which was published in Tehran, Iran, in the period 1933–1937. The publication is known for its pro-Nazi and anti-imperialist political stance.

== History and profile ==
Iran-e Bastan was first published on 21 January 1933 and edited by a Nazi sympathiser Persian journalist Abdulrahman Saif Azad who was also the founder and license holder of the magazine. The magazine was published in Tehran on a weekly basis. It enjoyed significant financial support from Persians during its early years. Germans also sponsored Iran-e Bastan. There is a report arguing that the magazine was directly published by the Nazi Ministry of Propaganda and that the real editor was a member of the Nazi Party, Major von Vibran.

Iran-e Bastan featured news and frequently published articles praising the ancient civilizations of Persia which were used to support an anti-imperialist perspective. The magazine also covered news about the achievements of Nazi Germany in the fields of science and technology. Due to its increasing pro-Nazi stance the magazine lost the financial support from Persians. Iran-e Bastan folded in 1937 when Abdulrahman Saif Azad left Iran for Europe. Following World War II he returned to Iran and restarted Iran-e Bastan in 1947, but he could not manage to continue its publication.
