= Aşiyan (magazine) =

Ottoman magazine (1908-1909)

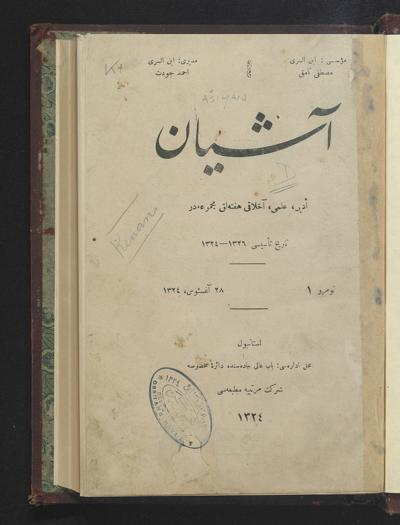
- Categories: Literature, Politics, Science
- Frequency: Weekly
- Founded: 1908
- Final issue: 1909
- Based in: Istanbul
- Language: Ottoman-Turkish
- Website: Aşiyan

The Ottoman journal Aşiyan (Arabic: آشیان; DMG: Āšiyān; English: "Home") was published in Istanbul between 1908 and 1909 in a total of 14 issues. The content focused on literary, scientific and political topics. One of the most famous writers of Aşiyan is Halide Edib Adıvar (1884-1964), a popular Turkish nationalist, writer and feminist. She published a range of articles that dealt with the women's position in the Ottoman Empire, the modernization of women and the criticism of former politics.
