= ISIRI 9147 =

Persian keyboard layout

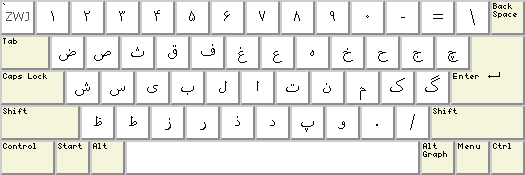
The standard Persian keyboard layout

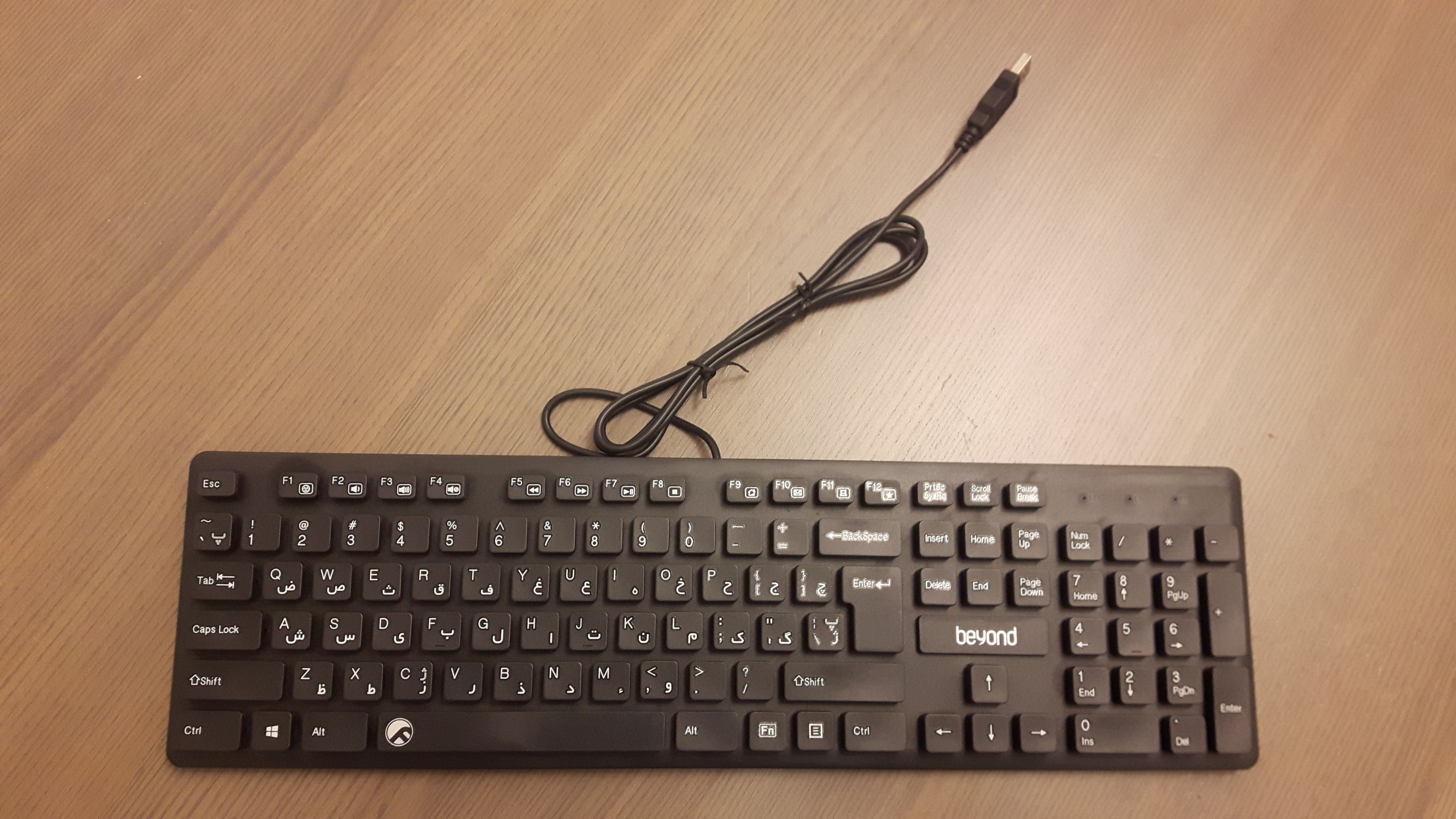
Keyboard with Latin and Persian letters

ISIRI 9147 is the Iranian national standard for Persian keyboard layout, based on ISIRI 6219 and the Unicode Standard. It was published on 2007-04-08, under the title Information technology – Layout of Persian letters and symbols on computer keyboards, by Institute of Standards and Industrial Research of Iran (ISIRI).

ISIRI 9147 keyboard layout (Iranian national standard for Persian keyboard layout)
Key code	Character on the key (American keyboard layout)	First level	Second level (while the "Shift" key is pressed)	Third level (while the "AltGr" key is pressed)
E00	~	U+200D	U+00F7	U+007E
E01	1	U+06F1	U+0021	U+0060
E02	2	U+06F2	U+066C	U+0040
E03	3	U+06F3	U+066B	U+0023
E04	4	U+06F4	U+FDFC	U+0024
E05	5	U+06F5	U+066A	U+0025
E06	6	U+06F6	U+00D7	U+005E
E07	7	U+06F7	U+060C	U+0026
E08	8	U+06F8	U+002A	U+2022
E09	9	U+06F9	U+0029	U+200E
E10	0	U+06F0	U+0028	U+200F
E11	-	U+002D	U+0640	U+005F
E12	+	U+003D	U+002B	U+2212
D01	Q	U+0636	U+0652	U+00B0
D02	W	U+0635	U+064C	—
D03	E	U+062B	U+064D	U+20AC
D04	R	U+0642	U+064B	—
D05	T	U+0641	U+064F	—
D06	Y	U+063A	U+0650	—
D07	U	U+0639	U+064E	—
D08	I	U+0647	U+0651	U+202D
D09	O	U+062E	U+005D	U+202E
D10	P	U+062D	U+005B	U+202C
D11	]	U+062C	U+007D	U+202A
D12	[	U+0686	U+007B	U+202B
C01	A	U+0634	U+0624	—
C02	S	U+0633	U+0626	—
C03	D	U+06CC	U+064A	U+0649
C04	F	U+0628	U+0625	—
C05	G	U+0644	U+0623	—
C06	H	U+0627	U+0622	U+0671
C07	J	U+062A	U+0629	—
C08	K	U+0646	U+00BB	U+FD3E
C09	L	U+0645	U+00AB	U+FD3F
C10	;	U+06A9	U+003A	U+003B
C11	"	U+06AF	U+061B	U+0022
B01	Z	U+0638	U+0643	—
B02	X	U+0637	U+0653	—
B03	C	U+0632	U+0698	—
B04	V	U+0631	U+0670	U+0656
B05	B	U+0630	U+200C	U+200D
B06	N	U+062F	U+0654	U+0655
B07	M	U+067E	U+0621	U+2026
B08	,	U+0648	U+003E	U+002C
B09	.	U+002E	U+003C	U+0027
B10	?	U+002F	U+061F	U+003F
BSL	\	U+005C	U+007C	U+2010
SPC		U+0020	U+200C	U+00A0
