= Al-Ahrar al-Musawwara =

Arabic journal

al-Aḥrār al-Muṣawwara
- Editor: Gibran Tueni
- Categories: Literature, satire, fiction
- Frequency: Weekly
- Founded: 1926
- Final issue: 1927
- Country: Lebanon
- Based in: Beirut
- Language: Arabic
- Website: https://nbn-resolving.de/urn:nbn:de:hbz:5:1-292615

The Arabic-language journal al-Ahrar al-Musawwara (Arabic: الأحرار المصورة; English: "The Illustrated Liberal Journal") claimed to be a literary, critical, humorous, and fictional journal published weekly in Beirut between 1926 and 1927. It was edited as a supplement to the daily newspaper Al Ahrar, published by the Lebanese journalist Gebran Tueni, who was also the founder of the journal an-Nahar.

The publication period of the magazine were important and eventful years in the history of Lebanon, as the country was under French mandate and divided into various states at that time. Al-Ahrar al-Musawwara used humor and caricatures to portray Lebanon and its political communities during the French mandate.

== See also ==
- List of magazines in Lebanon
