= Sharq (magazine) =

Persian literary magazine (1924-1932)

- Editor-in-chief: Saeed Nafisi
- Former editors: Ali Dashti, Naṣr-Allāh Falsafi
- Categories: Literature, History
- Founder: Moḥammad Ramażāni
- Founded: 1924
- Final issue Number: 1932
- Country: Iran
- Based in: Tehran
- Language: Persian

The Persian-language magazine Sharq (Persian: شرق, lit. 'East'; also Romanized as "Šarq") was published from 1924 to 1932 in Tehran. The first volume with two issues was edited by Moḥammad Ramażāni (1904–67), the owner of the publishing house Kolāla-ye ḵāvar, ʿAli Dašti and Naṣr-Allāh Falsafi. From 1930 on and under the leadership of Saʿid Nafisi (1895 – 1966), a Persian scholar, writer and poet, a second volume with a total of 12 issues was released.

The literary magazine published especially Persian literature and articles on Persian history and its neighboring countries. The editor wanted to introduce and familiarize the well-known Persian literature to a broad readership and to inform them about the latest recent books. Further, Persian translations of famous international works, such as Schiller's Maria Stuart, were published.
