= Ruh al-Qudus (magazine) =

Persian-language journal

روح القدس
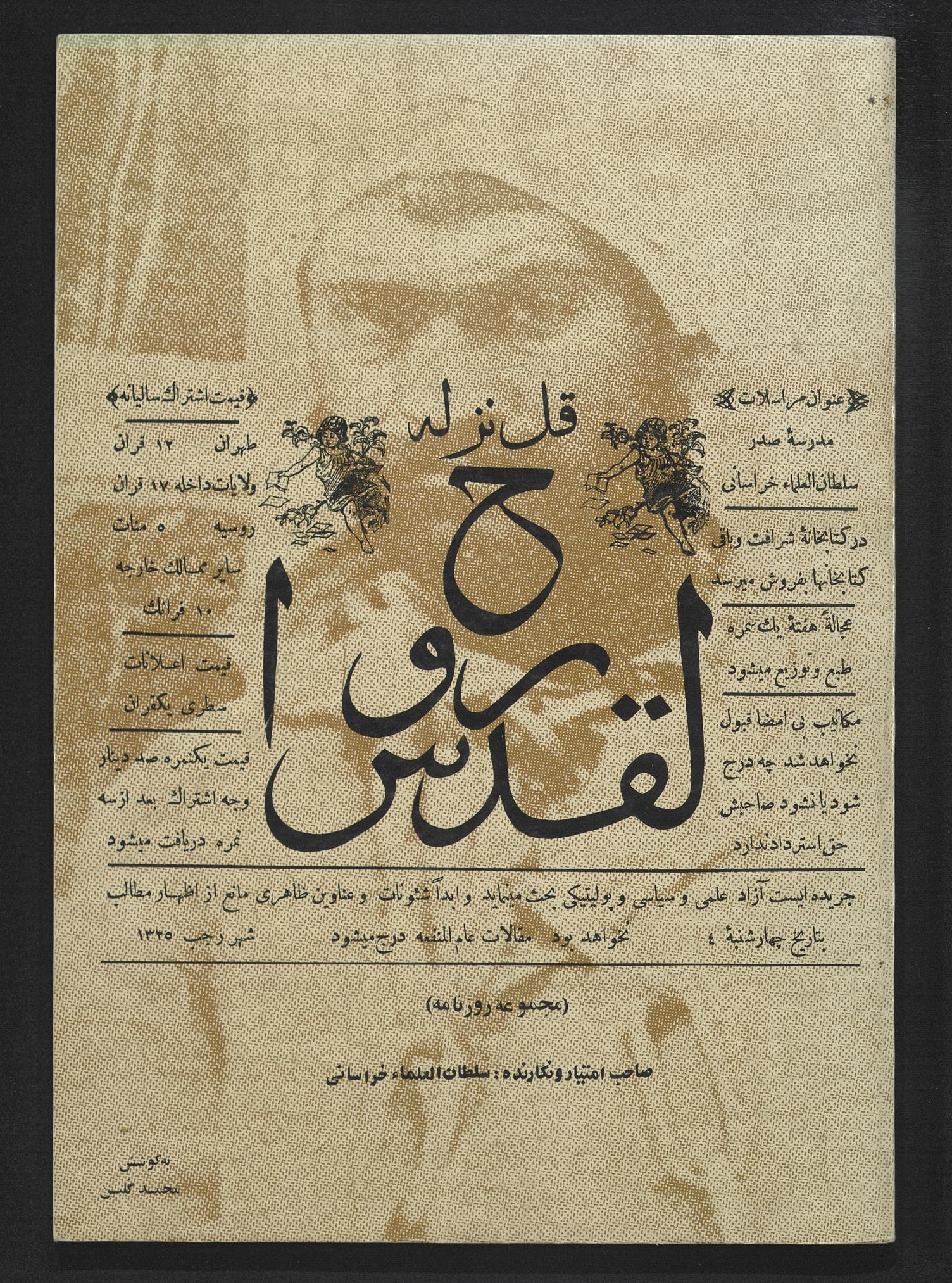
- Editor: Sultan al-'Ulama Khorasani
- Categories: Politics
- Founded: 1907
- Final issue: 1908
- Country: Iran
- Based in: Tehran
- Language: Persian
- Website: Rūḥ al-Qudus

The Persian-language journal Ruh al-Qudus (روح القدس; DMG: Rūḥ al-Qudus; "The Holy Spirit“) was published biweekly from 1907 to 1908 in Tehran in a total of 29 editions. The editor was Sultan al-'Ulama Khorasani (1839-1911), a Shiite religious scholar and political activist known for supporting the Constitutional Revolution in Iran (1905-1911) and for his criticism of Mohammed Ali Shah's government.

The foundation of this revolutionary opposition journal aimed to publish opinions on prevailing political and social conditions and to openly criticize the inconveniences. Because of its not necessarily simple language, it is assumed that a more politically educated and oppositional readership should be reached.

Together with the magazines Musavat and Sur-e Esrafil, Ruh al-Qudus contributed significantly to the support of the Constitutional Revolution through its revolutionary and aggressive orientation. After Mohammed Ali Shah's accession to the throne and the counterrevolution in June 1908, the magazine, as many other Iranian press mediums, was finally banned.
