= Ibrahim al-Yaziji =

Lebanese writer and poet

- إبراهيم اليازجي
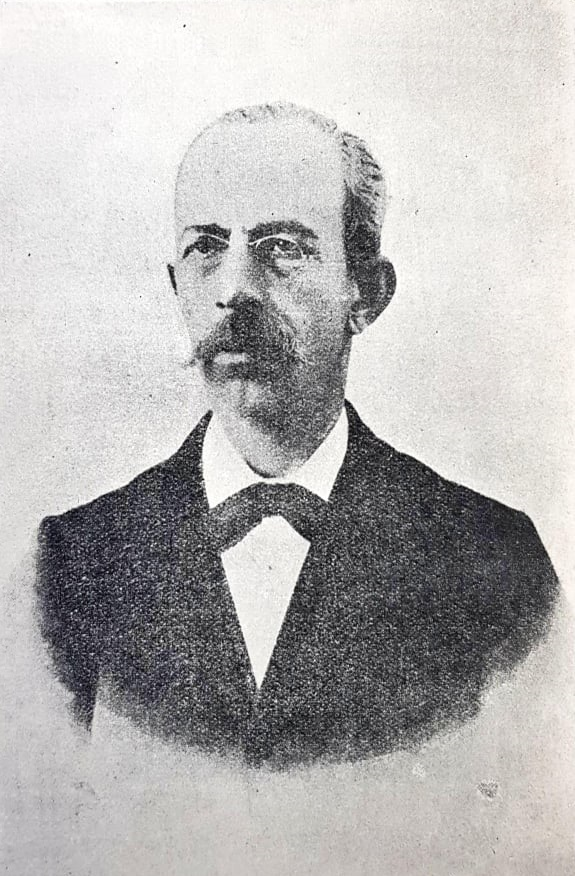
- Born: 2 March 1847; Beirut, Ottoman Empire (modern-day Lebanon)
- Died: 1906 (aged 58–59); Cairo, Khedivate of Egypt
- Occupations: Writer, philologist, poet, journalist
- Movement: Nahda
- Father: Nasif al-Yaziji

Ibrahim al-Yaziji (Arabic: إبراهيم اليازجي / ALA-LC: Ibrāhīm al-Yāzijī; 2 March 1847 – 1906) was a Lebanese writer, philologist, poet and journalist.

== Life ==
Ibrahim al-Yaziji was born in Beirut. He was the son of Nasif al-Yaziji, who was born in Kfarshima from a Melkite Catholic family originally from Homs (modern-day Syria).

He was an editor of several newspapers and magazines, such as Nagah and At-Tabib. Al Yaziji founded Ad-Diya magazine which was published between 1898 and 1906 in Cairo. He was instructed by Jesuits to translate the Bible into Arabic. The translation, which took place from 1876 to 1880, was published and said to be linguistically richer than the first translation of the Protestants. It was the second Bible translation in the Arabic language. The first translation was approved by the American Protestant missionaries under the leadership of the missionary Cornelius Van Alen Van Dyck, a professor at the American University of Beirut, along with Butrus al-Bustani and Nasif al-Yaziji. Their Bible translation appeared in 1866.

Among al-Yaziji's more well-known intellectual and ideological commitments was "championing Arabic as the bond of identity, over religion, among those for whom the language is a common tongue." This was sociopolitical project on the rise more broadly during Nahda (the Arab renaissance), which took place around the turn of the 20th century. Al-Yaziji advocated for secular Arab identity, based on language, "explicitly and famously" during his lifetime.

One of al-Yaziji's most significant innovations was the creation of a greatly simplified Arab font. By reducing Arabic character forms from 300 to 60 he simplified the symbols so that they more closely resembled Latin characters. It was a process that contributed to the creation of the Arabic typewriter.

The Bible translations of Bustāni, Nasif al-Yaziji and Ibrahim al-Yaziji were the first in the modern Arabic language.

== Literature ==
- Raif Georges Khoury: Importance et rôle des traductions arabes au XIX siècle comme moteur de la Renaissance arabe moderne. In : Les problématiques de la traduction arabe hier et aujourd’hui. Textes réunis par Naoum Abi-Rached. Strasbourg 2004. 47–95.
- Raif Georges Khoury: Quelques remarques sur le rôle des libanais dans la renaissance arabe moderne. In : Romanciers Arabes du Liban. Hrg. Edgard Weber. Toulouse 2002. 7-48.

== Bibliography ==
- Salibi, Kamal S. (2003). A House of Many Mansions: The History of Lebanon Reconsidered. I. B. Tauris & Co. ISBN 9781860649127.
