= Magallat Kulliyat al-Adab bi-l-Gamiʿat Faruq al-Awwal (magazine) =

Maǧallat Kullīyat al-Ādāb bi-l-Ǧāmiʿat Fārūq al-Awwal
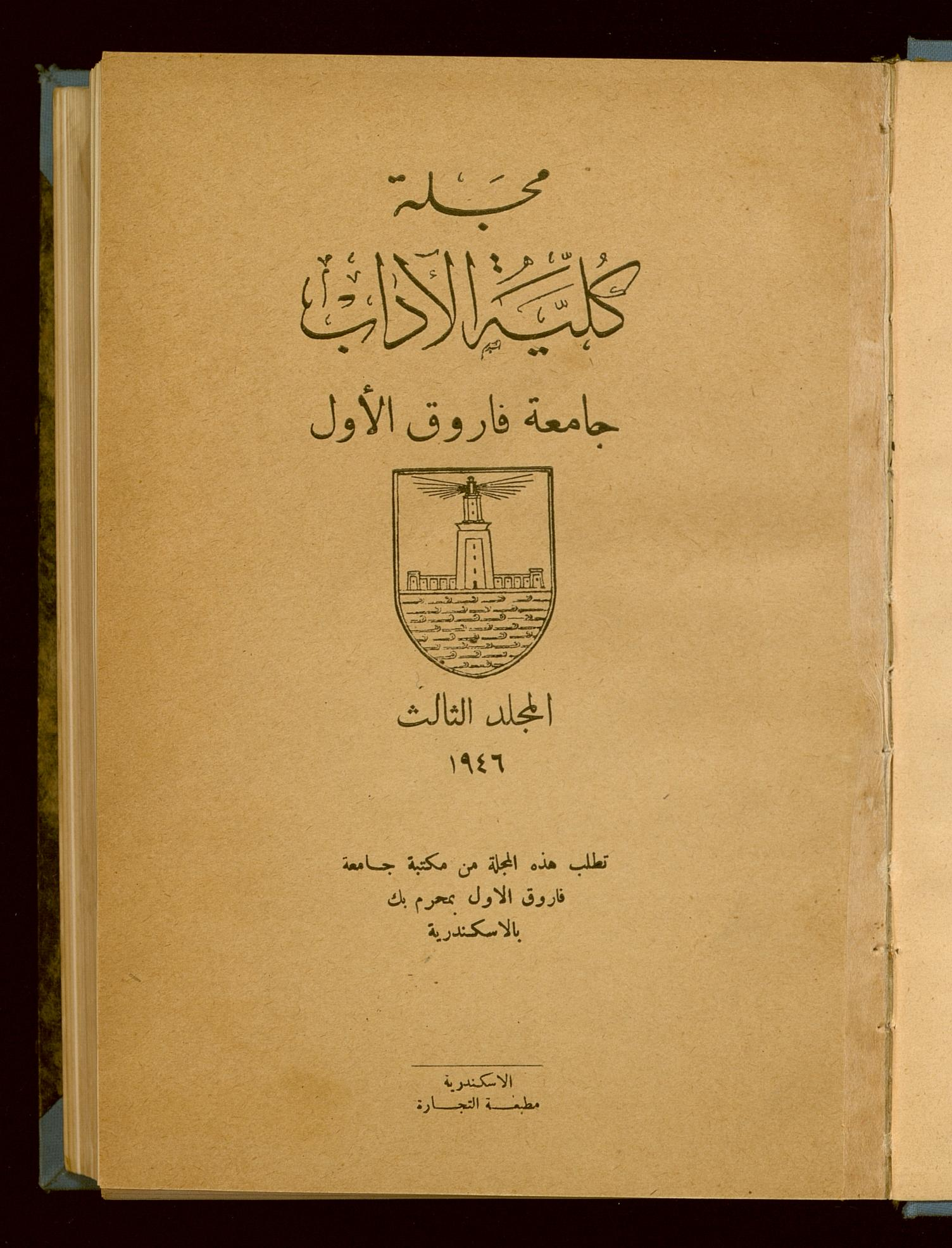
- Categories: Literature, Poetry, Philology
- Circulation: Annual
- Founded: 1943
- Final issue Number: 1972
- Country: Egypt
- Based in: Alexandria
- Language: Arabic
- Website: Maǧallat Kullīyat al-Ādāb bi-l-Ǧāmiʿat Fārūq al-Awwal

The Egyptian magazine Maǧallat Kullīyat al-Ādāb bi-l-Ǧāmiʿat Fārūq al-Awwal (Arabic: مجلة كلية الآداب بالجامعة فاروق الأول; DMG: Maǧallat Kullīyat al-Ādāb bi-l-Ǧāmiʿat Fārūq al-Awwal; English: "Bulletin of the Faculty of Arts of the Farouk I University") was published as sequel of Maǧallat Kullīyat al-Ādāb bi-l-Ǧāmiʿa al-Miṣrīya between 1943 and 1972 at the Faculty of Arts of the Alexandria University. The Alexandria University, formerly known as Farouk I University, was founded as a department of the Cairo University in 1938.

A total of 11 volumes were published, which were usually released irregularly once a year. As with its sequel, which was published between 1933 and 1942 at the Cairo University, there was a division into an Arabic and a European part and thus the publication of articles in Arabic, English, and French. In terms of content, the magazine focused on historical events, numerous translations, the study of Arab scholars and their writings, philosophy, poetry, and ancient languages. Additionally, the journal specialised in various topics related to Egypt, such as history, culture, and social development.
