= Maryam Amid =

Iranian intellectual and journalist (c. 1881/82–1919)

Mozayyen ol-Saltaneh Maryam Amid-Semnani
- Persian: مریم عمید سمنانی
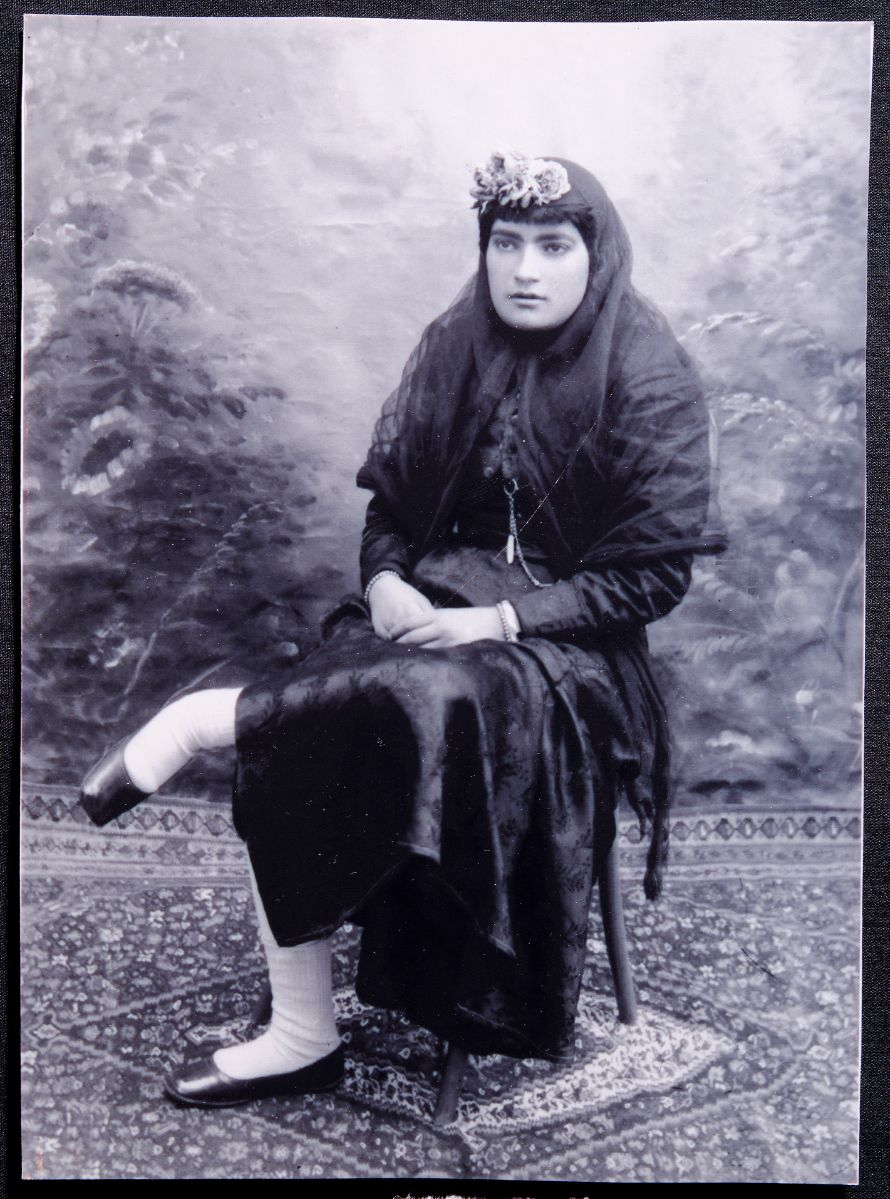
- Maryam Amid-Semnani
- Born: 1881 or 1882; Semnan, Qajar Iran
- Died: 1919
- Occupations: intellectual, journalist
- Known for: Civil rights advocacy

Maryam Amid-Semnani (Persian: مریم عمید سمنانی), also known by her honorific title Mozayyen ol-Saltaneh, was an Iranian intellectual and journalist active during the early 20th century. In Iran, she is remembered for founding Shokufeh, an influential women's magazine. She also established the Iranian Women's Society, which reportedly had 5,000 members at the peak of its popularity.

== Early life ==
Amid-Semnani was born in Semnan, in north-central Iran, during the Qajar era. She was the third daughter of Mir Seyed Razi Semnani (also known as Reyis Al-Atabeh) and Mirza Ibrahim Amid al-Saltanah. Her father was a doctor to Naser al-Din Shah Qajar, and the first representative of Semnan and Shahrud in the National Assembly. She received her primary education from her father, and later studied French and Photography.

Her family arranged for her to be married to the Hosseini Prince Mirza Emad al-Saltanah Salvar when she was 16. She was fiercely opposed to the marriage and managed to obtain a divorce after one year of marriage. Seven years later, she married an intellectual named Qavam ol-Hakmah. They had two children. After seven years of marriage, Qavam died, leaving Amid-Semnani to raise their children by herself.

== Establishment of girls’ school ==
In the patriarchal Iranian society of the time, religious conservatives strongly opposed girls' education. Most women were illiterate, as families were often reluctant to have their daughters educated. In 1912, Amid-Semnani set up a school for girls with two branches. One branch, Dar al-'Elm, offered reading and writing, mathematics, geography, and foreign languages. Candidates for admission to Dar al-'Elm were required to pass a test set by the Ministry of Education. The other branch, Dar Al-Sanayeh, was located in the Abmangel neighborhood. It provided tuition in artistic subjects and handicrafts such as carpet weaving, knitting, and hosiery. To encourage families to send their girls to school and keep them in school until the completion of their studies, Amid allowed many students to enroll for free.

== Shokufeh ==
Amid-Semnani launched the second-ever Iranian women's magazine. (The first, Danesh – or Knowledge – lasted only from 1910 to 1911.) Working under the name Maryam Amid Mozayen al-Saltaneh, she edited and wrote for Shokufeh (also transliterated as Shokoufeh, Shokofeh or Shekufeh and meaning Blossom), a magazine published in Teheran from 1912 or 1913 to 1916 or 1919 (sources differ on the years of publication).

The magazine was devoted to furthering education and equal rights for women. It featured articles on women's rights issues such as early marriage and lack of educational opportunities for girls, and also addressed political topics. It was noted for its use of satire, as its entire back cover was initially given over to social caricatures, although these were discontinued after the start of the First World War. Shokufeh was released twice a month and originally consisted of four pages printed in traditional Naskh calligraphic script. From the fifth issue onward, the magazine was published in Nastaliq script.

In addition to the journal, Amid-Semnani translated several French books into Persian.

== Anjoman Hemmat Khavatin ==
Amid-Semnani was a member of Anjoman Hemmat Khavatin (the Society for the Efforts of Women), and supported its activities in the pages of Shokufeh. One of the main goals of the association, which was headed by Noor al-Daji, was to prevent the import and use of foreign products.

== Opposition to superstition ==
Amid-Semnani fought against superstition and old traditions, especially among women. She used Shokufeh to expose oppression and reactionary ideas. Amid-Semnani, in condemning women's underdeveloped traditions in Iran, reviewed and compared the situation of women in other parts of the world, especially in Europe, and considered this as the most essential way to improve women's awareness in Iran.

== Death ==
Amid-Semnani died of a heart attack in September 1919 during a trip to her hometown of Semnan. She was reportedly 37 years old at the time of her death.

== See also ==
- Iranian women
- Women's rights movement in Iran
- Women's rights in Iran
