= Magallat Kulliyat al-Adab bi-l-Gamiʿa al-Misriya (magazine) =

Maǧallat Kullīyat al-Ādāb bi-l-Ǧāmiʿa al-Miṣrīya
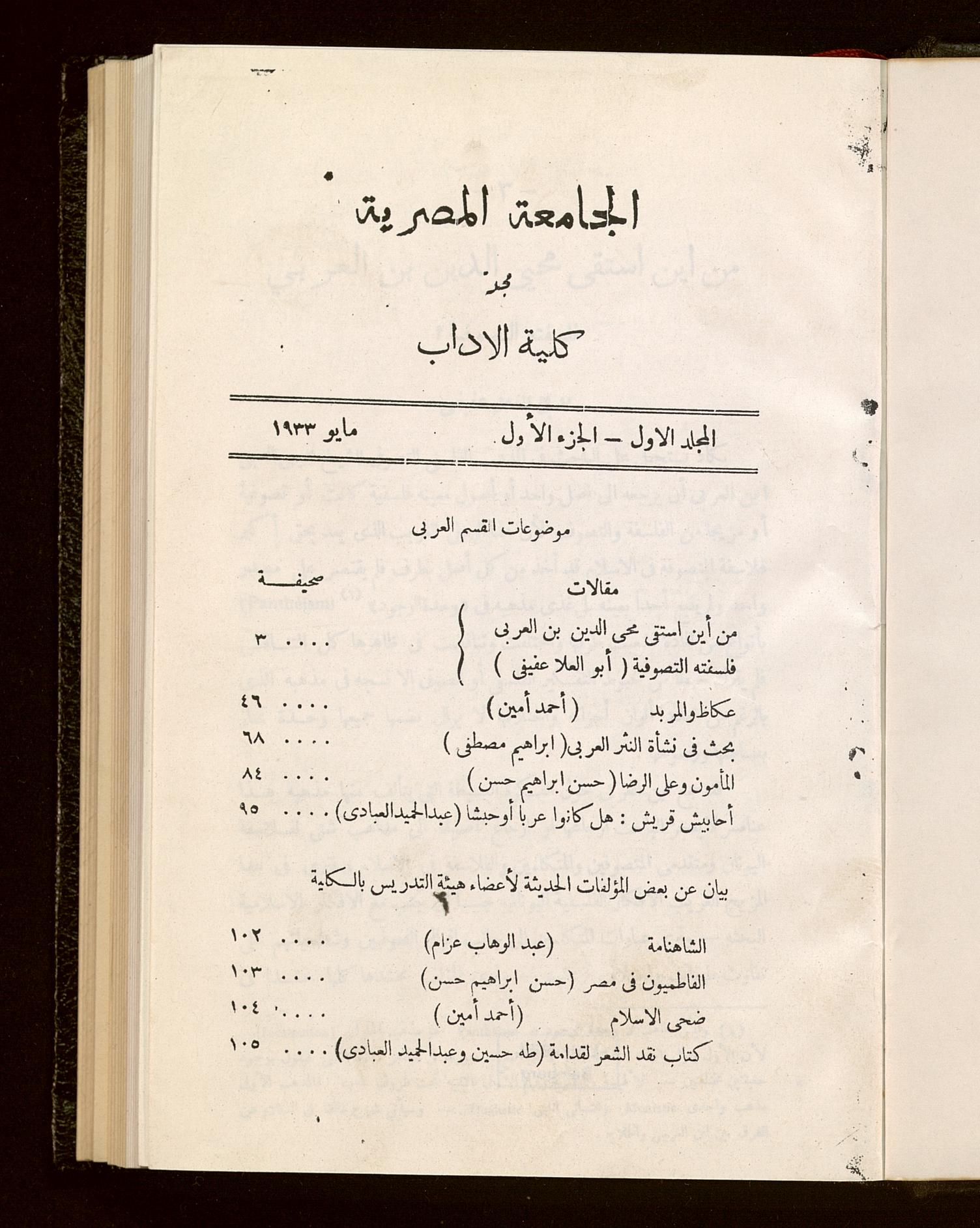
- Categories: Literature, Poetry, Philology
- Circulation: Biannual
- Founded: 1933
- Final issue: 1942
- Country: Egypt
- Based in: Cairo
- Language: Arabic
- Website: Maǧallat Kullīyat al-Ādāb bi-l-Ǧāmiʿa al-Miṣrīya

The Egyptian journal Maǧallat Kullīyat al-Ādāb bi-l-Ǧāmiʿa al-Miṣrīya (Arabic: مجلة كلية الآداب بالجامعة المصرية; DMG: Maǧallat Kullīyat al-Ādāb bi-l-Ǧāmiʿa al-Miṣrīya; English: "Bulletin of the Faculty of Arts of the University of Egypt") was published at Cairo University, formerly known as the University of Egypt resp. later known as Fuad I University, between 1933 and 1942. A total of ten issues was published in six editions every six months.

The special feature of this journal was the division into an Arabic and a European part and thus the publication of articles in Arabic, English and French. In terms of content, the magazine focused on historical events, numerous translations, the study of Arab scholars and their writings, philosophy, poetry and ancient languages. Additionally, the journal specialized in various topics related to Egypt, such as history, culture and social development.

After its publication discontinued between May 1937 and May 1941, a final issue was published in 1942. After the founding of the Alexandria University, formerly known as Farouk I University, as a department of the Cairo University, its sequel Maǧallat Kullīyat al-Ādāb bi-l-Ǧāmiʿat Fārūq al-Awwal/Bulletin of the Faculty of Arts of the Farouk I University has been published since May 1943.
