= Ad-Diya =

Cultural magazine published in Egypt (1898–1906)

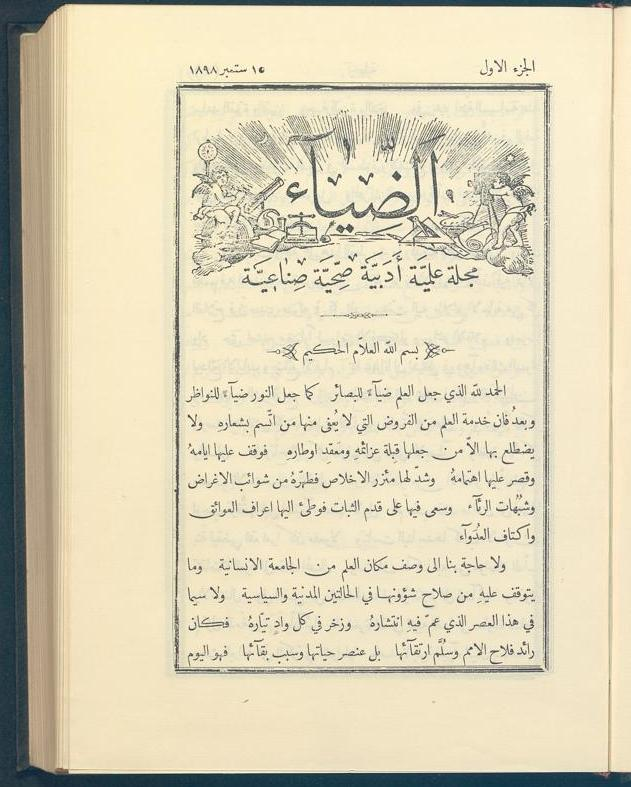
- The first issue of the magazine
- Editor: Ibrahīm Al-Yāziǧī
- Categories: Culture, anthropology, language, education
- Frequency: Twice per month
- Publisher: Ibrahīm Al-Yāziǧī
- Founder: Ibrahīm Al-Yāziǧī
- First issue: 15 September 1898
- Final issue: 31 July 1906
- Country: Egypt
- Based in: Cairo
- Language: Arabic

Between 1898 and 1906, the Arabic periodical aḍ-Ḍiyāʾ (Arabic: Illumination) was published twice a month in Cairo. There are eight year's issues with 24 numbers each (first to third year), resp. 20 numbers each (fourth to eighth year). Its founder and editor in chief was Ibrahīm al-Yāziǧī, a linguist and journalist from Lebanon, who on his readers’ request published aḍ-Ḍiyāʾ in succession to his earlier periodical al-Bayān (1897–1898). As regards content, it had the same agenda as al-Bayān. The subtitle of the periodical underlines this aspiration: “maǧallat ʿilmīya adabīya ṣaḥīya ṣanāʿīya“ (“a scientific, literary, sanitary and industrial journal”). It was one of the early magazines in Cairo which featured short stories. Alongside countless scientific and literary topics, articles on the development of newspapers in Egypt at that time are also to be found (cf. i. a. 1st year, 1st issue).

A complete and free available digital version of this journal can be found in the digital collections of the ULB Bonn.

== Sources ==
- Dagmar Glaß. (2004). Der al-Muqtaṭaf und seine Öffentlichkeit. Aufklärung, Räsonnement und Meinungsstreit in der frühen arabischen Zeitschriftenkommunikation, Band I+II, Würzburg, pp. 41f., 261, 429.
- Soueid, Père Paul (1969). Ibrahim Al-Yazigi, L'Homme et son Œuvre. Beirut. OCLC 1980217.
- Media related to Ad-Diya at Wikimedia Commons
