= Hüseyin Rahmi Gürpınar =

Turkish politician

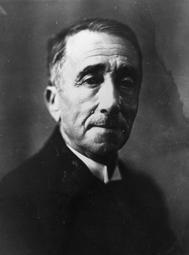

Member of the Grand National Assembly

Personal details
- Born: August 17, 1864 Istanbul, Ottoman Empire
- Died: March 8, 1944 (aged 79) Istanbul, Turkey

Hüseyin Rahmi Gürpınar (August 17, 1864 – March 8, 1944) was a Turkish writer, civil servant, and politician.

== Biography ==
Born in Istanbul, Gürpınar was the son of a family close to the Ottoman court. Having lost his mother at an early age, he was sent to Crete where his father was an Ottoman civil servant. However, he was soon sent back to Istanbul where he was brought up by his aunts and grandmothers in Istanbul.

Gürpınar started writing fiction at an early age. He became a civil servant, then a writer and journalist. He later served as a member of the parliament in the early years of the Turkish Republic between 1935 and 1943.

== Selected books ==
- "Şık" (1889)
- "İffet" (1896)
- "Metres" (1900)
- "Tesadüf" (1900)
- "Şıpsevdi" (1911)
- "Nimetşinas" (1911)
- "Kuyruklu Yıldız Altında Bir İzdivaç" (1912)
- "Gulyabani" (1913), translated by Hande Eagle (2024)
- "Hakka Sığındık" (1919)
- "Efsuncu Baba" (1924)
- "Evlere Şenlik, Kaynanam Nasıl Kudurdu" (1927)
- "Namusla Açlık Meselesi" (1933)
- "Utanmaz Adam" (1934)
- "İki Hödüğün Seyahati" (1934)
- "Gönül Ticareti" (1939)
- "Melek Sanmıştım Şeytanı" (1943)
- "Dirilen İskelet" (1946)
- "Deli Filozof" (1964)
- "Kaderin Cilvesi" (1964)
- "Namuslu Kokotlar" (1973)
- "Shikure Babezu" (1974)
- Odevara.com – Gulyabani Hüseyin Rahmi Gürpınar
- Bilgilik.com – Hüseyin Rahmi Gürpınar
- Edebiyatogretmeni.net – Hüseyin Rahmi Gürpınar
