= Tarbiyat =

Persian newspaper

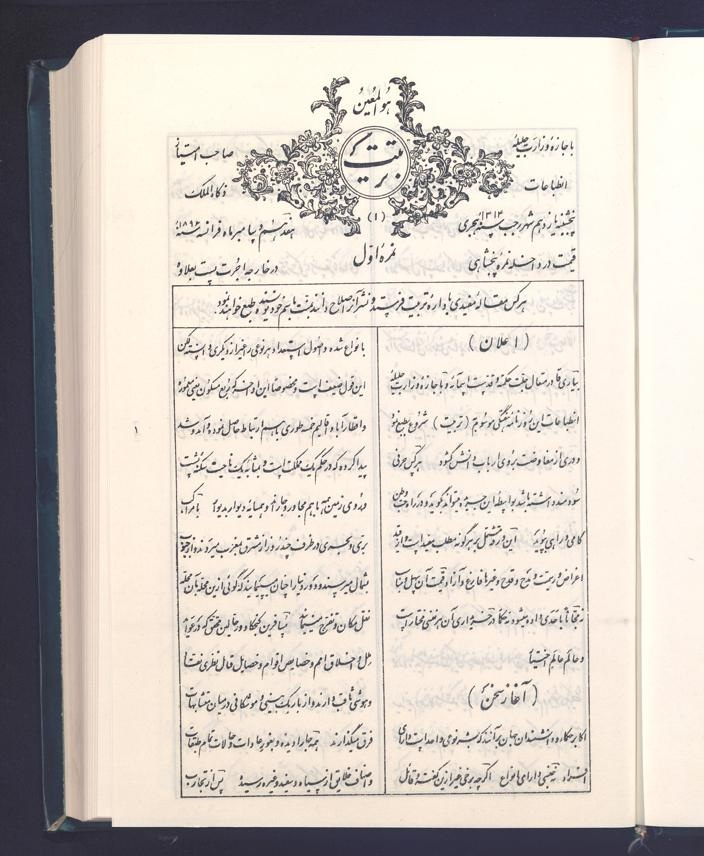
- First issue, 17 December 1896
- Categories: Literary, cultural
- Frequency: Irregular
- Publisher: Mirza Mohammad Hosseyn Foroughi
- Founded: 1896
- Final issue: 1907
- Country: Iran
- Based in: Tehran
- Language: Persian
- Website: Tarbiyat

The Persian Tarbiyat (Persian: تربيت; DMG: Tarbīyat; English equivalent: "Education") was the first non-governmental newspaper in Iran. It was founded in Teheran by Mirza Mohammad Hosseyn Foroughi, also known as Zaka-al Molk, in 1896 and was published until 1907. For Foroughi, who was a poet and also worked as a translator for Naser al-Din Shah, the acquisition of modern sciences was of decisive importance for the development of the country and its society. Contrary to the common perception of traditional education and science, he wanted to contribute to the modernisation of the Iranian society by publishing this journal. The publication history of the nine years with a total of 434 issues varied between daily, weekly and monthly publications. The articles deal with topics such as history and geography but also with medical and other scientific subjects. Particularly due to its literary focus and the publication of numerous translations the journal was a literary pioneer of that time.
