= Yadgar (magazine) =

Persian-language journal (1944 to 1949)

Yādgār
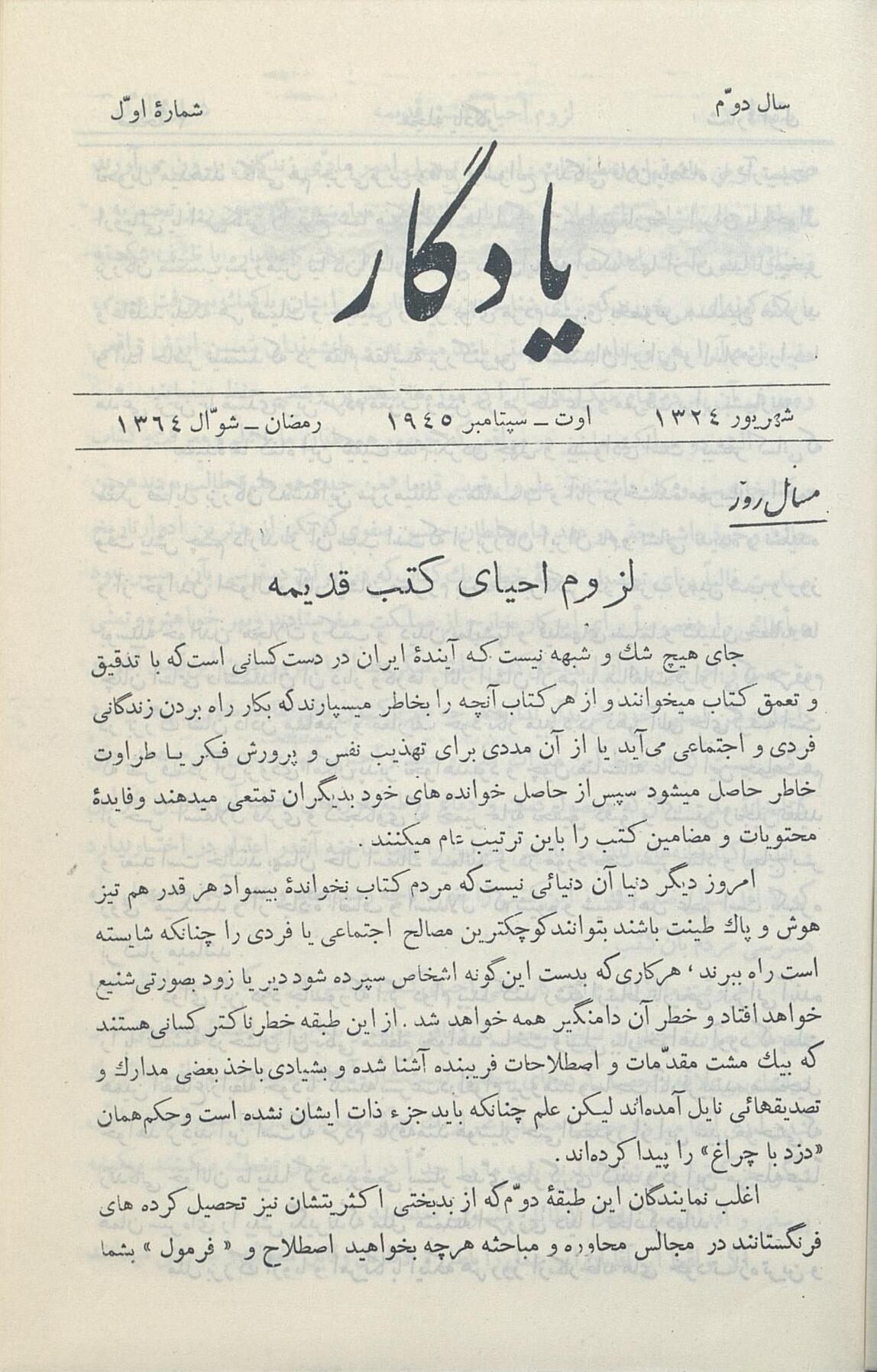
- Editor: Abbas Iqbal
- Categories: Literature and history
- Founded: 1944
- Final issue: 1949
- Country: Iran
- Based in: Tehran
- Language: Persian
- Website: Yādgār

Yadgar (Persian: یادگار; DMG: Yādgār; English: "Monument") was a Persian-language journal published from 1944 to 1949 in a total of 50 issues in Tehran. Its editor was Abbas Eqbal Ashtiani (1896–1955), a Persian historian and literary scholar. The Yadgar journal specialised in Iranian literary and historical research.
