= Sharaf (magazine) =

Former Tehrani magazine

Šaraf
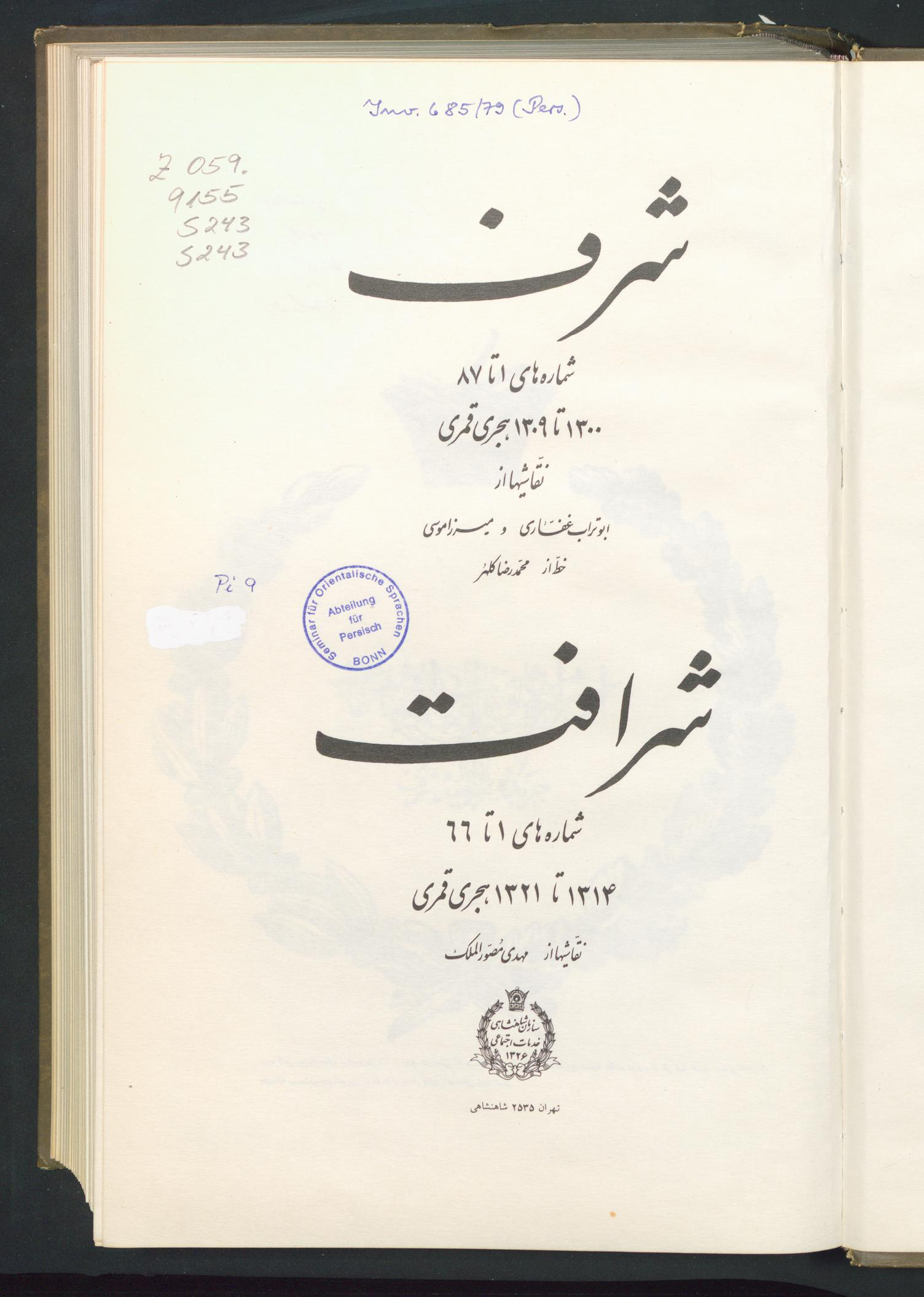
- Editor: Mohammad Hasan Khan E'temad os-Saltaneh
- Categories: History
- Frequency: Monthly
- Founded: 1882
- First issue: 12 November 1882
- Final issue: 1891
- Country: Iran
- Based in: Tehran
- Language: Persian
- Website: Šaraf

The monthly magazine Šaraf (Persian: شرف; DMG: Šaraf; English: “dignity“) was published in Tehran between 1882 and 1891. Under the management of Mohammad Hasan Khan E'temad os-Saltaneh (1840–1895), a total of 87 issues in one volume was published. This magazine became famous for its numerous and elaborate illustrations and photographs.

Mohammad Hasan Khan had graduated from the well-known Dar al-Funun University of Technology and in Paris as a historian and geographer. He was at the same time minister of the cabinet of Naser-ed-Din Shah. For the illustrations of the magazine he employed the most famous calligraphers, painters and photographers, such as Abu Torab Ghaffari. Their artworks complemented the biographies and portraits of famous Iranian and foreign notables, politicians and artists of that time, on their publication Sharaf was specialized. The magazine changed and revolutionized the art and painting of that time.
