= Envâr-ı Zekâ =

Turkish magazine (1883–1885)

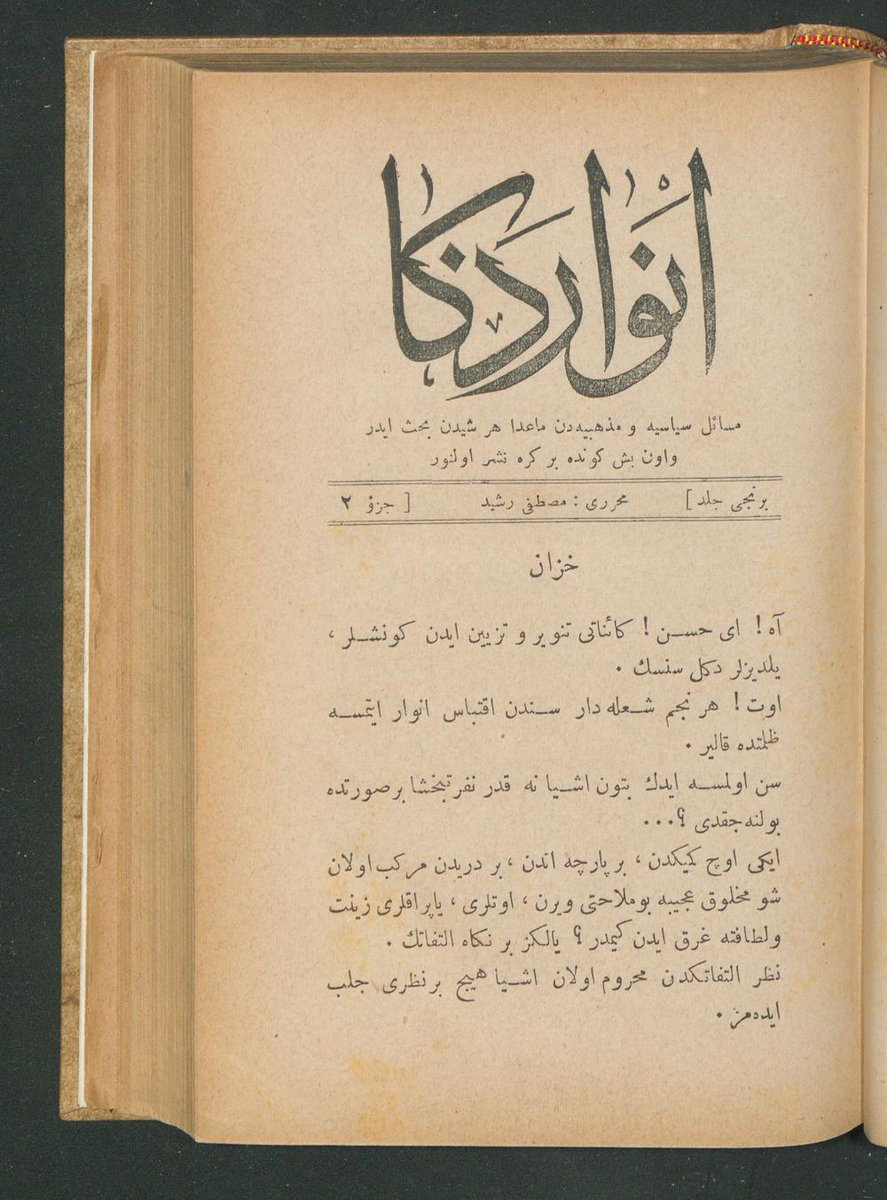
- Editor: Mustafa Reşid
- Categories: Literatur, philosophy, scientific translations
- Frequency: Biweekly
- Founded: 1883
- Final issue: 1885
- Country: Ottoman Empire
- Based in: Istanbul
- Language: Ottoman Turkish
- Website: Envâr-ı Zekâ

The journal Envâr-ı Zekâ (meaning Lights of Intelligence in English) was published between 1883 und 1885 (in the original between 1299 and 1302) by the Ebüzziya Printing House by the writer Mustafa Reşid in a total of 34 issues. The magazine defined itself as a "biweekly journal addressing everything but politics".

According to the editor, the journal was published every fifteen days, whereby the publication dates of the issues remain uncertain.

Envar-i Zeka is one of the magazines that witnessed the literary activities of the artists of intergeneration (ara nesil). It contains the works of Tanzimat artists and has a large staff of authors. Within the Turkish literature, its translation activities gained high importance. Besides literary, philosophical and scientific translations from German, French and English, one of the special features of this journal is one of the first examples of prose poetry and poetry in Turkish literature following the Tanzimat period.
