= Al-Fukaha (magazine) =

Satirical magazine published in Egypt (1926–1933)

al-Fukaha
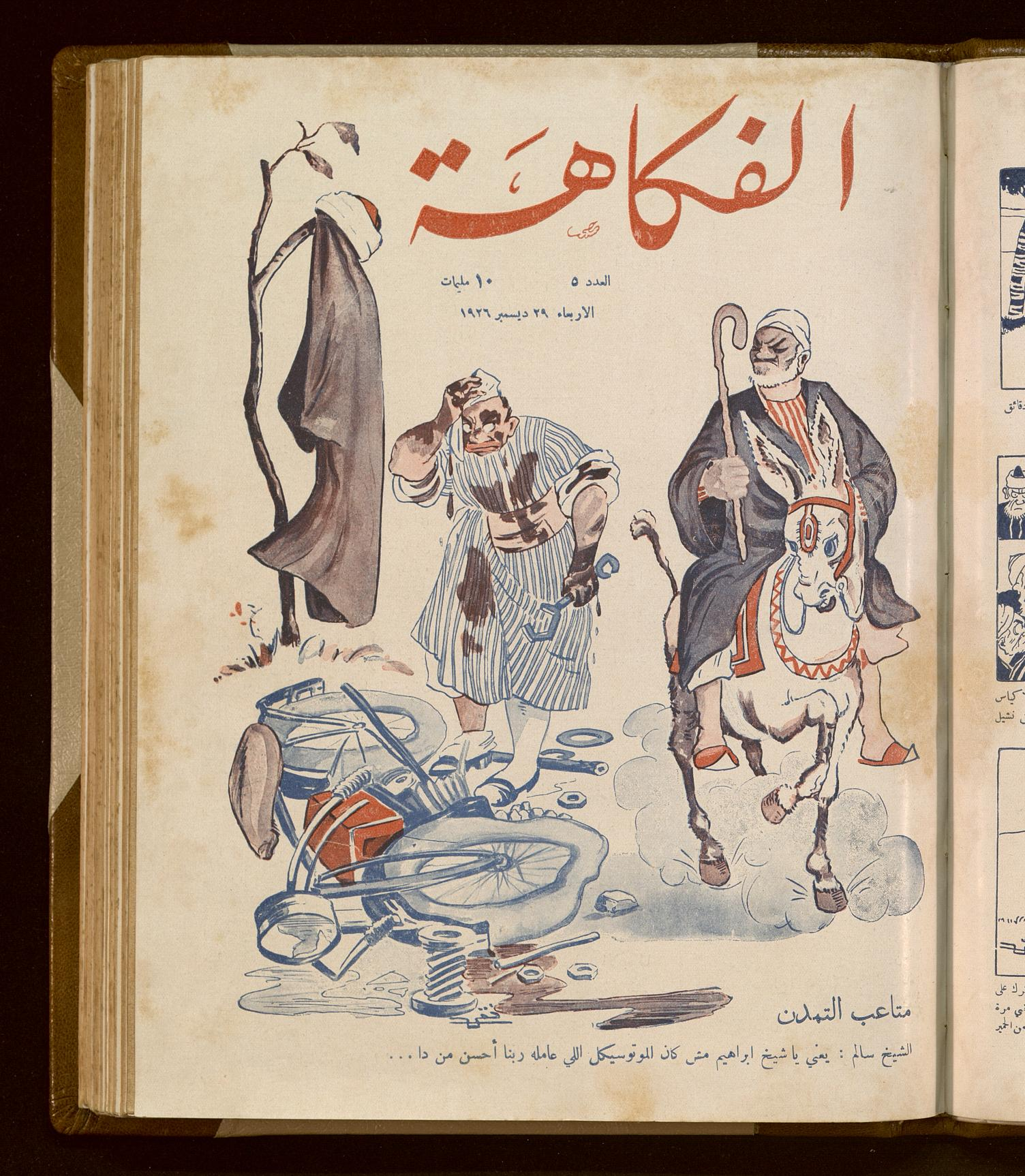
- Categories: Satire
- Frequency: Weekly
- Publisher: Dar al-Hilal
- Founded: 1926
- Final issue: 1933
- Country: Egypt
- Based in: Cairo
- Language: Arabic
- Website: nbn-resolving.de/urn:nbn:de:hbz:5:1-222676

The Arabic-language satirical weekly al-Fukaha (Arabic: الفكاهة; DMG: al-Fukāha; English: "Humour" or "Joke") was published in Cairo between 1926 and 1933. The famous publishing house Dar al-Hilal edited seven volumes with a total of 369 issues. The 48-page periodical largely started with a caricatural cover picture. A large range of caricatures, comics and illustrations supplemented the satirical texts whereby the style was reminiscent of the New Yorker art and Pin-Up-Art of that time. On the one hand the journals satire targeted the Cairo daily life, on the other hand the international social scene. In 1933 Dar al-Hilal combined both journals al-Fukaha and al-Kawakib to the satire magazine Al-Ithnayn (meaning "The Two" in English).
