= Shokufeh =

Former women's magazine in Iran (1913–1919)

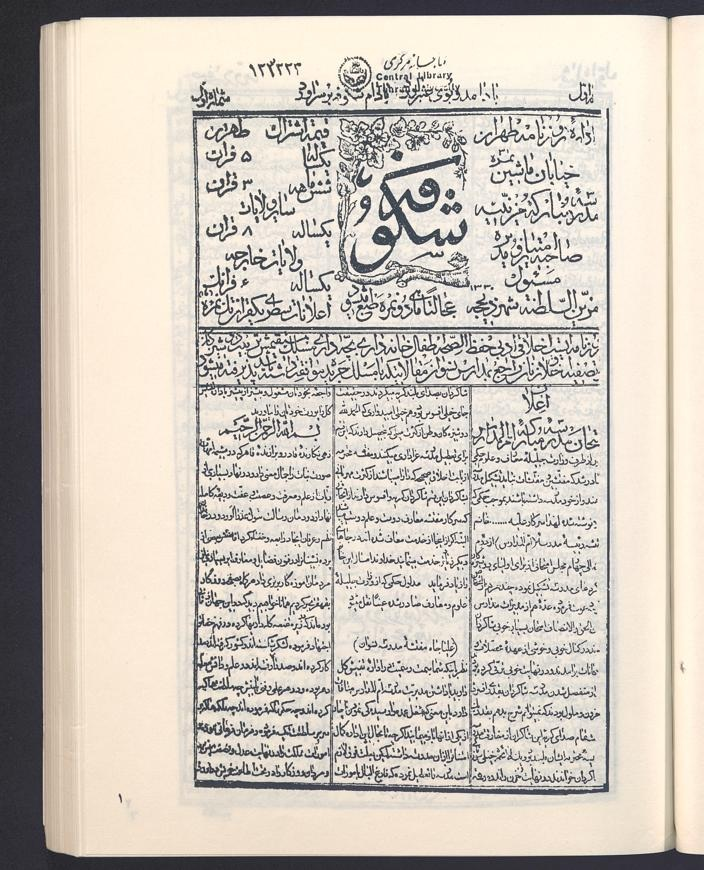
- Categories: Women's magazine
- Frequency: Biweekly
- Publisher: Maryam Amid Mozayen ol-Saltaneh
- Founded: 1913
- Final issue: 1919
- Country: Iran
- Based in: Tehran
- Language: Persian
- Website: Shokufeh

Shokufeh (Persian: شكوفه, DMG: Šokufeh, meaning "Blossom") was a Persian-language women's magazine published in Tehran from 1913 to 1919. It was the second women's magazine in Iran, following Danesh, which had appeared briefly in 1910–1911. Shokufeh was issued on a biweekly basis and became an influential platform for women's issues during the late Qajar period.

The magazine was founded and edited by Maryam Amid Mozayen ol-Saltaneh, the daughter of Aqa Mirza Sayyed Razi Ra’is al-Atebba, a prominent medical advisor at the Qajar court. In addition to her editorial work, Mozayen ol-Saltaneh also established an Iranian feminist society (Anjoman Hemmat Khavatin) around the same time. The objectives of this society, which included the promotion of Iranian industry, education, science, and the arts among women, were regularly published in Shokufeh.

Initially, the magazine focused on subjects related to women, including equality, education, hygiene, child-rearing, and ethics. However, as the activities of the Iranian Women’s Society expanded, Shokufeh began addressing more political themes, such as national independence and the evolving role of women in Iranian society. Although the magazine claimed not to interfere in the political sphere dominated by men, its growing engagement with national issues occasionally brought it under censorship.

The publication of Shokufeh was discontinued following the death of Mozayen ol-Saltaneh in 1919.
