= Nu'man al-Qasatili =

Nu'man Abduh al-Qasatili (surname also transliterated Qasatli: 1854–1920) was a Syrian writer and one of the leading novelists associated of the Nahda (renaissance) era, despite his only two-year career as a fiction writer. Before authoring his three novels, Qasatili wrote a comprehensive history of his hometown Damascus and a travelogue of Palestine.

== Life ==
Qasatili was born in Damascus in 1854 to an Arab Christian family. At the age of six, he experienced the massacre of Christians in Damascus during the 1860 Syrian civil war. He recalled hiding in an oven to survive the assault on the city's Christian quarters. In the aftermath, his family moved to Beirut, where Qasatili was raised. He spent the rest of his life between both cities and became acquainted with their learned circles.

He became a protege of the prominent writer and literary scholar Butrus al-Bustani, who became a key figure of the Nahda, the Arab cultural renaissance movement of the 19th century. Qasatili's career as a fiction writer was short, 1880 to 1882, after which "he seems to have sunk into complete oblivion until his death" in 1920, according to historian Matti Moosa. Despite his short career, his contributions were significant, though he was one of the Nahda's "least studied individuals", according to Fruma Zachs and Sharon Halevi. They call Qasatili one of the three major novelists of the Nahda, alongside Jurji Zaydan and Butrus's son Salim al-Bustani.

== Works ==
In 1876, he wrote a history of Damascus published as al-Rawda al-Ghanna' fi Dimashq al-Fahya. According to Abdul-Karim Rafeq, Qasatili "dealt with almost all aspects of life in the city with much insight and analysis".

He wrote an unpublished travelogue of Palestine and Syria (al-Rawda al-Nu'maniyya fi Siyahat Filastin wa ba'd al-Buldan al-Shamiyya. These were part of a lost work he titled Mir'at Suriyya wa Misr [Mirror of Syria and Egypt]. Two of the three sections of this book which covered his travels in Palestine were rediscovered by Rafeq in the Zahiriyya Library of Damascus.

Qasatili authored three novels published in Bustani's periodical al-Jinan. Together with the novels of Bustani and Zaydan, played a key role in the Arab cultural debate of the period regarding the effects of modernity, science, women's role in society, and national sentiment. They were al-Fatat Amina wa Ummuha [The Faithful Young Woman and her Mother, 1880], Riwayat Murshid wa-Fitna [A Novel of the Marshal and the Civil War] and Riwayat Anis [A Novel of Anis, 1881–1882].

== Bibliography ==
- Zachs, Fruma; Halevi, Sharon (2015). Gendering Culture in Greater Syria: Intellectuals and Ideology in the Late Ottoman Period. London and New York: I.B. Tauris. ISBN 978-1-78076-936-3.
- Moosa, Matti (1997). The Origins of Modern Arabic Fiction (Second ed.). Boulder, Colorado and London: Lynne Riener Publishers. ISBN 0-89410-683-X.
- Rafeq, Abdul-Karim (2000). "Ottoman Jerusalem in the Writing of Arab Travellers". In Auld, Sylvia; Hillenbrand, Robert (eds.). Ottoman Jerusalem: The Living City. 1517-1917, Part 1 & 2. London: Council for British Research in the Levant and Al Tajir Trust. pp. 63–72. ISBN 1-901435-03-2.
