= Al Siyassa Al Musawwara =

Satirical magazine in Egypt and in Italy (1907–1923)

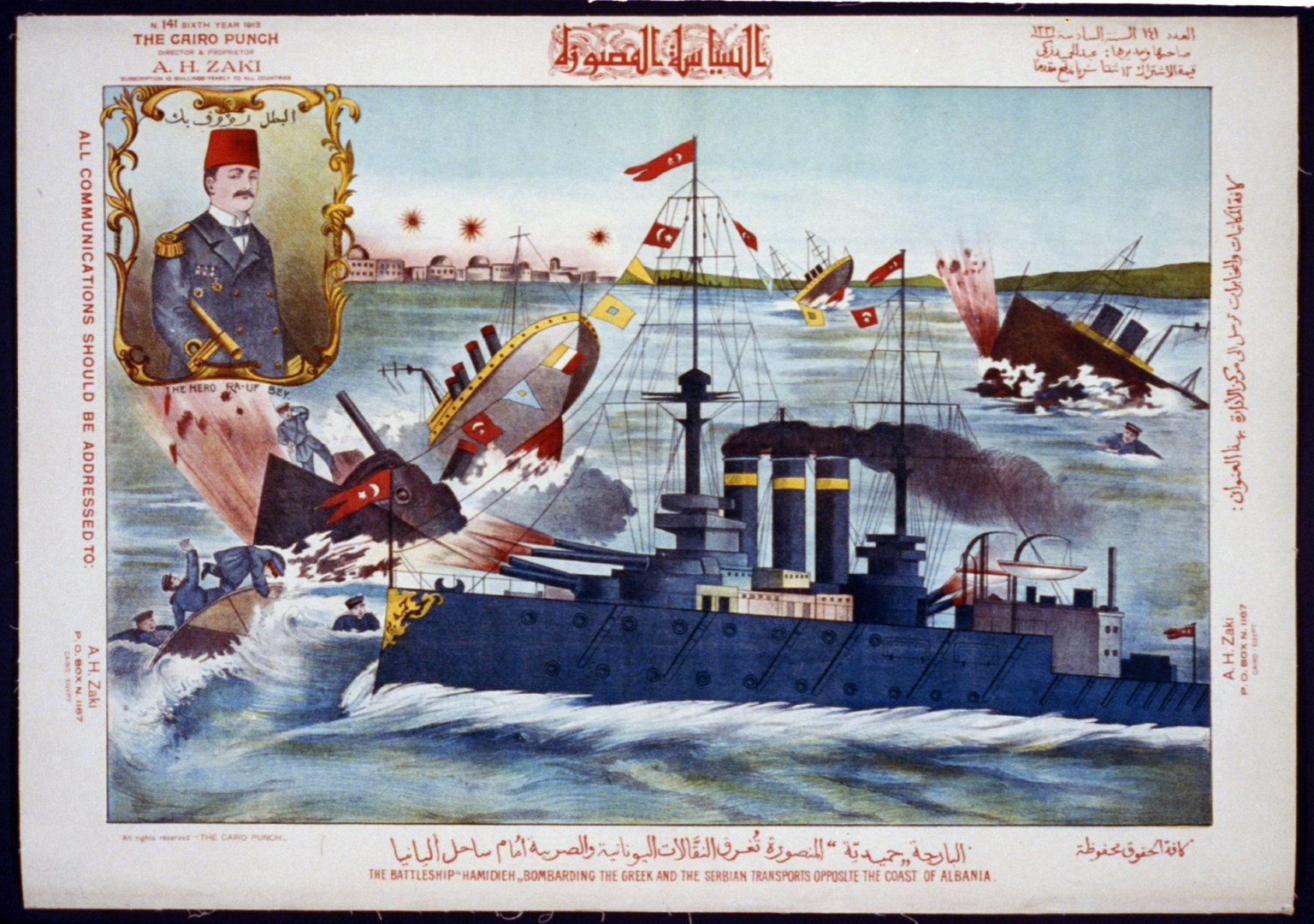
- Color lithograph by Abdul Hamit Zaki published in Al Siyassa Al Musawwara in 1913
- Categories: Political satire magazine
- Founded: 1907
- First issue: December 1907
- Final issue: 1923
- Country: Egypt; Italy
- Based in: Cairo; Bologna
- Language: Arabic; English; French

Al Siyassa Al Musawwara (Arabic: السياسة المصورة, romanized: as-Siyasa al-Musawwara, lit. 'Politics Illustrated') was a multilingual magazine. The magazine was also referred to as the Cairo Punch. It was started in 1907 in Cairo, Egypt, but when its publisher Abdul Hamit Zaki exiled into Italy, it was published in Bologna until 1923.

== History and profile ==
Al Siyassa Al Musawwara was launched on 15 December 1907 and edited and published by Abdul Hamit Zaki who would leave Egypt for Italy. On the masthead of the magazine there was another title in addition to Arabic title, namely Cairo Punch.

Al Siyassa Al Musawwara featured colour political caricatures and satire and had a nationalist political stance. Its content was published in three languages, Arabic, English and French, and it covered political affairs in Egypt and in other countries, including the British occupation and European imperialism. Textual materials were written by Hafiz Ibrahim. The magazine frequently mocked the publishers of the pro-British newspaper, Al Muqattam, who were Syrian-origin Christians, namely Faris Nimr, Yaqub Sarruf and Shahin Makaryus.

Following the exile of Abdul Hamit Zaki Al Siyassa Al Musawwara was published until 1923 in Bologna.

The first thirty-seven issues of Al Siyassa Al Musawwara are archived in the Hoover Institution Library of Stanford University.
