= Rahil Ata =

Lebanese teacher and translator (1826–1894)

- Born: 1826; Beirut, Ottoman Syria
- Died: 1894 (aged 67–68)
- Education: American Mission School for Girls
- Occupations: Teacher; Translator
- Spouse: Butrus Bustani
- Children: 9, including Salim

Rahil Ata (1826 – 1894) was a teacher and translator who was the wife of the leading writer and scholar Butrus Bustani. She is known to be the "wife and mother of the Nahda (awakening) movement" which was developed by Bustani. Ata played a significant role in the formation of the ideals of domestic love and equality supported by the movement.

== Biography ==
Ata was born in Beirut in 1826 to Greek Orthodox parents. She attended the American Mission School for Girls founded by the American missionaries Eli and Sarah Smith. They adopted her when she was eight years old. Although Sarah died just two years after her adoption, Ata did not return to her family home and was cared by the missionaries. She later worked as an Arabic translator for the missionary and changed her religious affiliation becoming a Protestant. Following her graduation Ata was employed as a teacher at the American Mission School for Girls. She translated children's books from English into Arabic.

She met Butrus Bustani at the missionary office. Although her birth family did not approve their marriage, they wed in 1843. She joined the Evangelical Church in 1848. Ata shared her husband's views about the necessity of reform. She particularly encouraged him to support girls' education. Ata assisted him in the translation activities and in the establishment of the first literary club of Beirut in 1847. She was also active in the establishment and management of the National School in Beirut. It was the first educational institution which adopted a secular program in the Ottoman Syria. It served students from different religious backgrounds. Ata later established her own school in Hasbaya.

Ata and Bustani had nine children, four boys and five girls. Their first child was Sarah who was born on 3 April 1844 and was named after Sarah Smith. Their second child was Salim who worked with his father in various activities. Their last child, Alice, was born in 1870. Ata was a model for her daughters who all received education. One of them, Louisa, married Khalil Sarkis who was the founder of the Lisan al-Hal newspaper. The family lived in the Zuqaq al-Blat neighbourhood in Beirut in the 1860s. Ata died in 1894.
