= Al Nafais Al Asriyyah =

Arabic literary and political magazine in Palestine (1908–1923)

- Categories: Literary magazine; Political magazine
- Frequency: Weekly; Biweekly; Monthly
- Founder: Khalil Beidas
- Founded: 1908
- Final issue: 1923
- Country: Ottoman Palestine; Mandatory Palestine
- Based in: Haifa (1908–1910); Jerusalem (1910–1923)
- Language: Arabic

Al Nafais Al Asriyyah (Arabic: النفائس العصرية, romanized: al-Nafais al-'Asriyya, lit. 'The Modern Treasures'), simply Al Nafais, was a literary and political magazine which was published between 1908 and 1923 with an interruption during World War I. It was founded, published and edited by the Palestinian writer Khalil Beidas and was the most read literary periodical published in Palestine under the Ottomans. Its subtitle was Majalla adabiyya tarikhiyya fukahiyya (Arabic: A recreational and historical literary magazine).

== History and profile ==
Al Nafais Al Asriyyah was launched by Khalil Beidas in 1908. The magazine was headquartered in Haifa, but it was moved to Jerusalem in 1910. It was modeled on other Arabic magazines, including Al Muqtataf and Al Hilal, but Beidas also designed Al Nafais using the features of the Russian literary journals such as Sovremennik and Russkii Vestnik. Throughout its lifetime the publication frequency of Al Nafais changed from weekly to biweekly and then to monthly.

In the early years it was a literary magazine which covered the translations of Russian literary works into Arabic. Beidas and Iskandar Al Khuri Al Beitjali translated these texts which were published in the magazine. The texts translated by Beidas included the stories by the Russian author Leo Tolstoy in which there was a clear opposition against the Orthodox church establishment. In 1919 Beidas also published his only novel entitled Al Warith (Arabic: The Heir) in Al Nafais. In addition, the magazine supported the novice literary genres and attempted to relate them with the Arab culture. Palestinian poet Khalil Al Sakakini and Isaf Al Nashashibi were among its regular contributors.

Al Nafais temporarily ceased publication in 1914 when World War I broke out and was restarted in Jerusalem on 26 July 1919. In this second phase it began to contain political materials partly due to the Russian revolution. It also contained articles on linguistics and history. The magazine folded in 1923 after producing 117 issues. Its successor was Al Ikha which was established by Salim Qub'ayn in Cairo.
