= Palestinian identity =

Shift in implications of "Palestinian" over time

Prior to the rise of nationalism during the decline of the Ottoman Empire, the term Palestinian referred to any person born in or living in the region of Palestine, regardless of their ethnic, cultural, linguistic, and religious affiliations. During the British Mandate for Palestine, the term "Palestinian" referred to any person legally considered to be a citizen of Mandatory Palestine as defined in the 1925 Citizenship Order.

The population of Palestine have long used the term "Palestinian" as one of their endonyms of self-identification. Eusebius in the fourth century and Al-Maqdisi in the 10th century used it as a geographical identity marker, while it was used later in a more explicitly nationalist sense, as by Khalil Beidas in the 19th century. Like all national identities, the Palestinian national identity is modern, with most scholars tracing its emergence to the early 20th century. Some argue that a nascent Palestinian nationalism was sparked by the 19th century revolts and the general nationalist awakenings throughout the empire, while others argue that it emerged as a reaction to Zionism.

After the establishment of the State of Israel during the 1948 Palestine war, the Jews of Mandatory Palestine became known as "Israeli Jews", having developed a national Jewish identity centered on a Jewish National Homeland in Palestine, derived from a political and ideological movement known as Zionism. By the mid-1950s, the term "Palestinian" had shifted to be a demonym that exclusively refers to the Arabs of former Mandatory Palestine, including their descendants, who had developed a distinctly Palestinian Arab national identity.

In contemporary times, the term "Palestinian" is the national demonym of the Palestinian people.

== Types and definitions ==
=== Geographical ethnonym ===
"Palestinian" may be used as an adjective to describe persons or objects which are related to Palestine. This was employed by historical authors such as Zosimus while describing the troops amassed by the Roman Emperor Aurelian to confront Palmyrene troops in the Crisis of the Third Century.

Many centuries earlier, in the 5th century BC, Herodotus employed the term as part of an ethnonym, speaking of the "Syrians of Palestine" or "Palestinian-Syrians", an ethnically amorphous group he distinguished from the Phoenicians.

Between the tenth and eighteenth centuries CE, several scholars living in the region of Palestine, like the Jerusalemites Shams ad-Din al-Maqdisi and Mujir al-Din al-'Ulaymi, and natives of Ramla Khayr al-Din al-Ramli and the Palestinian Christian priest Yusuf Jahshan used Palestinian as a term of self-identification, or described Palestine as "our country" (biladuna), indicating consciousness of belonging to a distinctive territorial-based entity, though more in social terms than political. The Muslim scholars partly drew that multifaceted identity from the cultural and religious legacy of Jund Filastin, the region's medieval Arab-Islamic administrative province.

Eusebius of Caesarea Maritima was using similar terminology in his fourth century CE work the Martyrs of Palestine, which documents those martyred for being Christian under Roman rule in his time, connecting them to earlier Christians of Palestine, like Saint Paul and Saint Peter. He ends the work by expressing his hope that he can represent "our land" to Christians elsewhere in the world and through this work make "the whole people of Palestine" (Syriac: ˁammā kullēh d-Pallistīnā) proud.

A couple of decades after the establishment of the Kingdom of Jerusalem in 1099, Fulcher of Chartres wrote that the Crusaders had been transformed from "Westerners" into "Easterners", and that "He who was a Roman or a Frank has been transformed on this earth into a Galilean or a Palestinian." After Saladin retook Jerusalem in 1187, some of fhe Crusaders who owned land and had integrated into the local population stayed, embraced Islam, and were Arabized, and their descendants today in places like the Hebron region identify as Palestinian, Arab and Muslim.

=== Legally ===
During the British Mandate over Palestine, a "Palestinian" could mean any person who was born in or hailed from the region of Palestine or was a citizen of the Mandatory Palestine, the terms of acquisition of which were laid out in the Palestinian Citizenship Order 1925. The term covered all the inhabitants of the region, including people from Muslim, Christian and Jewish backgrounds, and all ethnicities, including Arabs, the Dom people, Samaritans, Druze, Bedouins and the traditional Jewish communities of Palestine, or Old Yishuv, whose ancestors were already living there prior to the onset of Zionist immigration.

"Arab" and "Palestinian Arab" were used following the immigration of non-Arabic speakers to distinguish between the natives and newcomers who were also granted Palestinian citizenship by the British Mandatory government.

In the aftermath of the 1948 Palestine war and the establishment of the State of Israel, a "Palestinian" tends to refer to individuals from non-Jewish communities born in the West Bank and Gaza Strip, and citizens of the State of Palestine, including the populations of Palestinian refugees living in the wide Middle East and other Palestinian diaspora populations worldwide.

Prior to the establishment of the State of Palestine then an interim government during the Oslo Accords in 1993: the remaining parts of Arab Palestine were annexed by Jordan and occupied by Egypt. The people of the West Bank became citizens of the Kingdom of Jordan until its disengagement in 1988, as part of the annexation of the occupied parts which were later renamed as "West Bank of the Jordan River", while the inhabitants of the Egyptian-occupied Gaza Strip were considered to be citizens of the internationally unrecognized client All-Palestine Protectorate. The residents of the Gaza Strip became stateless after the dissolution of the All-Palestine government.

In Israel, former Palestinian Jews that acquired Israeli citizenship became Israeli Jews. Non-Jewish Palestinians that acquired Israeli citizenship are officially referred to by Israel's government as "Israeli Arabs" or "Arab Israelis", though the development of Palestinian nationalism in the 20th and 21st centuries saw a marked evolution in self-identification with Palestinian identity, sometimes alongside Arab and Israeli signifiers. (Note: An IDI Guttman Study of 2008 shows that most Arab citizens of Israel identify as Arabs (45%). While 24% consider themselves Palestinian, 12% consider themselves Israelis, and 19% identify themselves according to religion.) A number of Palestinian citizens of Israel have family ties to Palestinians in the West Bank and Gaza Strip as well as to Palestinian refugees in Jordan, Syria and Lebanon.

The 2018 Nation-state law defines nationality in Israel as the exclusive right of the Jewish people, meaning that non-Jews, while holding citizenship, are denied any right of national belonging or self-determination.

==== Palestinian refugees ====
UNRWA defines the Palestinian refugees as those whose normal place of residence between June 1946 and May 1948 was in the land that is now Israel, but they went outside during the 1948 war. UNRWA, however, provides aid to Palestinian refugees defined as such, as well as the descendants of those Palestinians. UNRWA does define "Palestinian refugees" to include descendants of "refugees".

Politically

The PLO's Palestinian National Covenant of 1964 defines a Palestinian as "the Arab citizens who were living permanently in Palestine until 1947, whether they were expelled from there or remained. Whoever is born to a Palestinian Arab father after this date, within Palestine or outside it, is a Palestinian".

=== In Ethnography ===
The word "Palestinian" in academia is occasionally used as a term rather than a demonym by ethnographers, linguists, theologians, and historians to denote a specific subculture in Palestine. In such context, it covers not only those who have a Palestinian Arab national identity or Jews of Palestine, but also those inhabitants of the Southern Levant as a whole, including ethnic and religious minorities such as the Druze, the Dom, the Circassians, and the Samaritans, and the Palestinian Bedouin.

== Cultural heritage and identity ==
A unique Palestinian cultural heritage, most closely associated with rural parts of Palestine, is an important part of Palestinian identity. This heritage includes vernacular architecture, archaeological and historical sites, handicrafts and local industries (like tatreez) Hebron glass, Nabulsi soap), folkore, traditional dances and songs.

Palestinian ethnographers at in the first half of the 20th century, like Tawfiq Canaan, Omar Saleh al-Barghouti, Stephan Hanna Stephan, Elias Haddad, and Khalil Totah, were deeply concerned with documenting and preserving rural cultural practices. They believed "that the peasants of Palestine represent – through their folk norms ... the living heritage of all the accumulated ancient cultures that had appeared in Palestine (principally the Canaanite, Philistine, Hebraic, Nabatean, Syrio-Aramaic and Arab)."

The Zionist denial of Palestinian identity and the rootedness of Palestinians in the land has led to increased efforts to preserve and revive this heritage.

== Emergence of Palestinian nationality ==
The timing and causes behind the emergence of a distinctively Palestinian national consciousness among the Arabs of Palestine are matters of scholarly disagreement. Some argue that it can be traced as far back as the peasants' revolt in Palestine in 1834 (or even as early as the 17th century), while others argue that it did not emerge until after the Mandatory Palestine period. Legal historian Assaf Likhovski states that "the dominant view" is that Palestinian identity originated in the early decades of the 20th century, when an embryonic desire among Palestinians for self-government in the face of generalized fears that Zionism would lead to a Jewish state and the dispossession of the Arab majority crystallised among most editors, Christian and Muslim, of local newspapers. Nazmi Al-Jubeh, professor of history and archaeology, sees Zionism as having impacted how Palestinian identity developed, while noting that a Palestinian identity, in the sense of belonging to the land of Palestine, is evident over its long history, though not in modern national terms and always in tandem with several other historical, social and cultural identity affiliations.

The term Filasṭīnī, previously used mainly as a geographical endonym, was launched into the local modern political discourse by Khalīl Beidas in a translation of a Russian work on the Holy Land into Arabic in 1898. After that, its usage gradually spread so that, by 1908, with the loosening of censorship controls under late Ottoman rule, a number of Muslim, Christian and Jewish correspondents writing for newspapers began to use the term with great frequency in referring to the 'Palestinian people'(ahl/ahālī Filasṭīn), 'Palestinians' (al-Filasṭīnīyūn) the 'sons of Palestine(abnā’ Filasṭīn) or to 'Palestinian society',(al-mujtama' al-filasṭīnī).

Saladin's Falcon, the coat of arms and emblem of the Palestinian Authority

Whatever the differing viewpoints over the timing, causal mechanisms, and orientation of Palestinian nationalism, by the early 20th century strong opposition to Zionism and evidence of a burgeoning nationalistic Palestinian identity is found in the content of Arabic-language newspapers in Palestine, such as Al-Karmil (est. 1908) and Filasteen (est. 1911). Filasteen initially focused its critique of Zionism around the failure of the Ottoman administration to control Jewish immigration and the large influx of foreigners, later exploring the impact of Zionist land-purchases on Palestinian peasants (Arabic: فلاحين, fellahin), expressing growing concern over land dispossession and its implications for the society at large.

Historian Rashid Khalidi's 1997 book Palestinian Identity: The Construction of Modern National Consciousness is considered a "foundational text" on the subject. He notes that the archaeological strata that denote the history of Palestine – encompassing the Biblical, Roman, Byzantine, Umayyad, Abbasid, Fatimid, Crusader, Ayyubid, Mamluk and Ottoman periods – form part of the identity of the modern-day Palestinian people, as they have come to understand it over the last century. Noting that Palestinian identity has never been an exclusive one, with "Arabism, religion, and local loyalties" playing an important role, Khalidi cautions against the efforts of some extreme advocates of Palestinian nationalism to "anachronistically" read back into history a nationalist consciousness that is in fact "relatively modern".

Khalidi argues that the modern national identity of Palestinians has its roots in nationalist discourses that emerged among the peoples of the Ottoman Empire in the late 19th century that sharpened following the demarcation of modern nation-state boundaries in the Middle East after World War I. Khalidi also states that although the challenge posed by Zionism played a role in shaping this identity, that "it is a serious mistake to suggest that Palestinian identity emerged mainly as a response to Zionism."

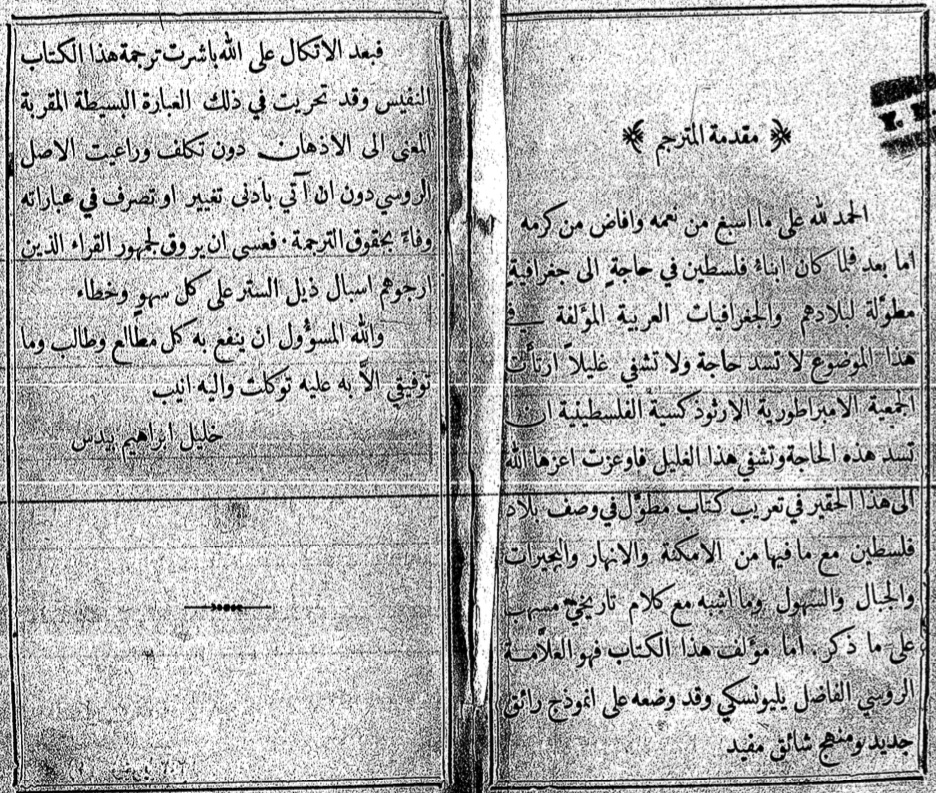
Khalil Beidas's 1898 use of the word "Palestinians" in the preface to his translation of Akim Olesnitsky's A Description of the Holy Land

Conversely, historian James L. Gelvin argues that Palestinian nationalism was a direct reaction to Zionism. In his book The Israel-Palestine Conflict: One Hundred Years of War he states that "Palestinian nationalism emerged during the interwar period in response to Zionist immigration and settlement." Gelvin argues that this fact does not make the Palestinian identity any less legitimate: "The fact that Palestinian nationalism developed later than Zionism and indeed in response to it does not in any way diminish the legitimacy of Palestinian nationalism or make it less valid than Zionism. All nationalisms arise in opposition to some 'other.' Why else would there be the need to specify who you are? And all nationalisms are defined by what they oppose."

David Seddon writes that "[t]he creation of Palestinian identity in its contemporary sense was formed essentially during the 1960s, with the creation of the Palestine Liberation Organization." He adds, however, that "the existence of a population with a recognizably similar name ('the Philistines') in Biblical times suggests a degree of continuity over a long historical period (much as 'the Israelites' of the Bible suggest a long historical continuity in the same region)."

Baruch Kimmerling and Joel S. Migdal consider the 1834 Peasants' revolt in Palestine as constituting the first formative event of the Palestinian people. From 1516 to 1917, Palestine was ruled by the Ottoman Empire save a decade from the 1830s to the 1840s when an Egyptian vassal of the Ottomans, Muhammad Ali, and his son Ibrahim Pasha successfully broke away from Ottoman leadership and, conquering territory spreading from Egypt to as far north as Damascus, asserted their own rule over the area. The so-called Peasants' Revolt by Palestine's Arabs was precipitated by heavy demands for conscripts. The local leaders and urban notables were unhappy about the loss of traditional privileges, while the peasants were well aware that conscription was little more than a death sentence. Starting in May 1834 the rebels took many cities, among them Jerusalem, Hebron and Nablus and Ibrahim Pasha's army was deployed, defeating the last rebels on 4 August in Hebron. Benny Morris argues that the Arabs in Palestine nevertheless remained part of a larger national pan-Arab or, alternatively, pan-Islamist movement. Walid Khalidi argues otherwise, writing that Palestinians in Ottoman times were "[a]cutely aware of the distinctiveness of Palestinian history ..." and "[a]lthough proud of their Arab heritage and ancestry, the Palestinians considered themselves to be descended not only from Arab conquerors of the seventh century but also from indigenous peoples who had lived in the country since time immemorial, including the ancient Hebrews and the Canaanites before them."

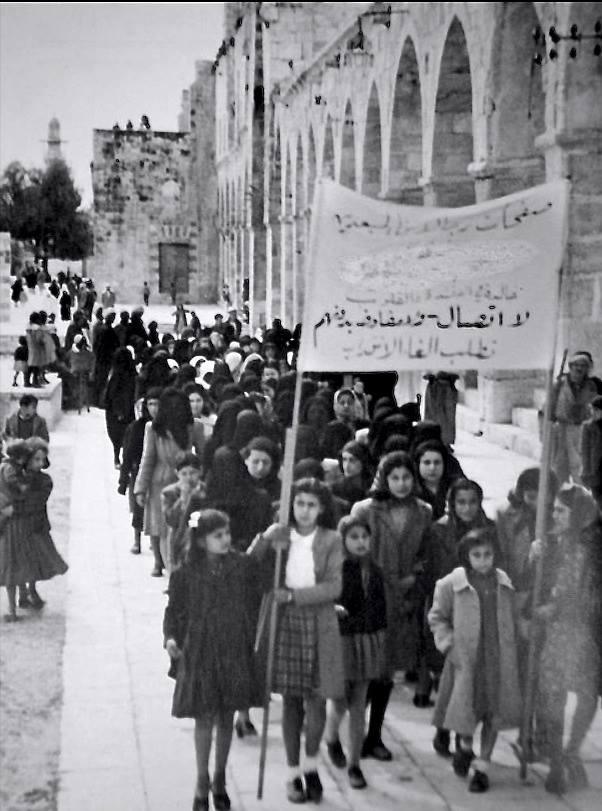
A 1930 protest in Jerusalem against the British Mandate by Palestinian women. The sign reads "No dialogue, no negotiations until termination [of the Mandate]"

Bernard Lewis argues it was not as a Palestinian nation that the Arabs of Ottoman Palestine objected to Zionists, since the very concept of such a nation was unknown to the Arabs of the area at the time and did not come into being until very much later. Even the concept of Arab nationalism in the Arab provinces of the Ottoman Empire, "had not reached significant proportions before the outbreak of World War I." Tamir Sorek, a sociologist, submits that, "Although a distinct Palestinian identity can be traced back at least to the middle of the nineteenth century (Kimmerling and Migdal 1993; Khalidi 1997b), or even to the seventeenth century (Gerber 1998), it was not until after World War I that a broad range of optional political affiliations became relevant for the Arabs of Palestine."

Israeli historian Efraim Karsh takes the view that the Palestinian identity did not develop until after the 1967 war because the Palestinian exodus had fractured society so greatly that it was impossible to piece together a national identity. Between 1948 and 1967, the Jordanians and other Arab countries hosting Arab refugees from Palestine/Israel silenced any expression of Palestinian identity and occupied their lands until Israel's conquests of 1967. The formal annexation of the West Bank by Jordan in 1950, and the subsequent granting of its Palestinian residents Jordanian citizenship, further stunted the growth of a Palestinian national identity by integrating them into Jordanian society.

The idea of a unique Palestinian state distinct from its Arab neighbors was at first rejected by Palestinian representatives. The First Congress of Muslim-Christian Associations (in Jerusalem, February 1919), which met for the purpose of selecting a Palestinian Arab representative for the Paris Peace Conference, adopted the following resolution: "We consider Palestine as part of Arab Syria, as it has never been separated from it at any time. We are connected with it by national, religious, linguistic, natural, economic and geographical bonds."

== Denial of Palestinian identity ==
Since the days of early Christian Zionism, Palestinian identity has been the subject of dismissive rhetoric. The phrase "A land without a people for a people without a land" was used as early as 1843 by a Christian Restorationist clergyman, and the phrase continued to be used for almost a century predominantly by Christian Restorationists, and was later adopted as Jewish Zionist slogan, to an extent that historians dispute.

After the inception of the State of Israel, a phrase that has similarly become often repeated is Israeli Prime Minister Golda Meir's remark that "There was no such thing as Palestinians. When was there an independent Palestinian people with a Palestinian state? It was either southern Syria before the First World War and then it was a Palestine including Jordan. It was not as though there was a Palestinian people in Palestine considering itself as a Palestinian people and we came and threw them out and took their country from them. They did not exist." as part of an interview with Frank Giles, then deputy editor of The Sunday Times on June 15, 1969, to mark the second anniversary of the Six-Day War. It is considered to be the most famous example of Israeli denial of Palestinian identity, and has been frequently been used to illustrate the denial of Palestinian history and sum up the Palestinians' sense of invisibility to Israel.

In 2023, Bezalel Smotrich, the Minister of Finance in Israel's 2022 far-right coalition government, reiterated the denial of Palestinian identity.

== Bibliography ==
- Kimmerling, Baruch; Migdal, Joel S. (2003). The Palestinian People: A History. Cambridge, Mass: Harvard University Press. ISBN 978-0-674-01131-1.
