= Butrus al-Bustani =

Lebanese Christian Nahda writer

- بطرس البستاني
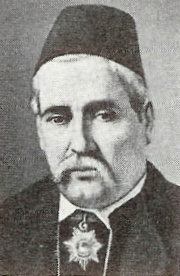
- Portrait of al-Bustani
- Born: January 1819; Dibbiye, Chouf, Ottoman Empire (modern-day Lebanon)
- Died: May 1, 1883 (aged 64); Beirut, Ottoman Empire (modern-day Lebanon)
- Occupations: Writer, scholar, lexicographer, periodical editor, translator
- Notable work: Muhit al-Muhit, Da'irat al-Ma'arif
- Movement: Nahda
- Spouse: Rahil Ata

Butrus al-Bustani (Arabic: بُطرُس الْبُسْتَانِيّ, ALA-LC: Buṭrus al-Bustānī; 1819–1883) was a writer and scholar from Mount Lebanon. He was a major figure in the Nahda, the Arab renaissance which began in Ottoman Egypt and had spread to all Arab-populated regions of the Ottoman Empire by the end of the 19th century.

He is considered to have been the first Syrian nationalist, due to his publication of Nafir Suriyya which began following the 1860 Mount Lebanon civil war. He founded the secular Arabic-language al-madrasa al-wataniyya (the National School) in 1863 in Beirut. In 1870, he founded Al-Jinan, the first important example of the kind of literary and scientific periodicals which began to appear in the 1870s in Arabic alongside the independent political newspapers.

== Life ==
Al-Bustani was born to a Maronite Christian family in the village of Dibbiye in the Chouf region of Lebanon, his family hailed from the village Bqarqacha in Mount Lebanon. In January 1819. He received primary education in the village school, where he attracted the attention of his teacher, Father Mikhail al-Bustani, because of his keen intelligence that he showed brilliantly.

The latter recommended him to the Bishop of Sidon and Beiteddine, Abdullah al-Bustani, who sent him at the age of 11 to the school at ‘Ayn Warqa in Ghosta, the most famous school of that period, to continue his studies there. At ‘Ayn Warqa where he learned Syriac and Latin. He spent ten years there and learned several foreign languages including French, Italian and English.

In 1840, after completing his studies at ‘Ayn Warqa’, Al-Bustani moved to Beirut and obtained his first employment outside of academia as a dragoman for the British Armed Forces assisting them in their efforts to evict Ibrahim Pasha from Syria in the interest of preserving the Ottoman Empire. Later that year al-Bustani was hired by American Protestant missionaries as a teacher and from that point on he worked closely with the Protestant mission in Beirut.

In Beirut, he came into contact with the American Protestant missionaries with whom he worked closely until his death on May 1, 1883. Following his initial employment with the American Protestant Mission in Beirut al-Bustani spent most of his years working for the American Protestant Mission. It was during these years that al-Bustani converted to their Protestant faith and completed many of his early works. Arabic grammar and arithmetic books were among these early works along with the Van Dyck's version of the Bible, the most popular Arabic translation of the Bible used today. Both al-Bustani and Nasif Al-Yaziji worked on Van Dyck's version under the supervision of Eli Smith who was an American Protestant Missionary, scholar and Yale graduate. The translation project was continued unto fruition after al-Bustani under Cornelius Van Allen Van Dyck. While working to translate the Bible, Al-Bustani learned Hebrew, Aramaic and Greek, and perfected Syriac and Latin thus bringing the number of languages he mastered to nine.

He was married to Rahil Ata (1826–1894) who is called mother of the Nahda movement. They had nine children, four boys and five girls. Their first child was Sarah who was born on 3 April 1844. Their second child was Salim who worked with his father in various activities. Their last child, Alice, was born in 1870. One of their daughters married Khalid Sarkis who was the founder of the Lisan al-Hal newspaper. The family lived in the Zuqaq al-Blat neighbourhood in Beirut in the 1860s.

== Role in the Nahda ==
In the late 1840s, al-Bustani obtained the position of the official dragoman for the American Consulate in Beirut which he held until he passed it on to his son Salim in 1862. Through the 1850s Bustani continued to work closely with the Protestant Missionaries in their attempt of proselytizing and educating Arab Christians in the Levant. However, at this time al-Bustani began to diverge from the Missionaries' method of education and began to express publicly the need for an Arabic identity that would be reflected in all spheres of society. In a lecture, “on the literature of the Arabs”, given in February 1859 al-Bustani publicly called for a revival of literature and scholarly works in the Arabic language. It was also in 1859 that al-Bustani disengaged from his work with the mission and devoted his time to this cause. Shortly after his lecture in Beirut in 1859, al-Bustani became the secretary of a cultural association for the publication of Arabic books, al-Umda’ al-Arabiyya l-Ishar al-Kutub al-Arabiyya. It was al-Bustani's exodus from religious education and move towards secular, national education at this time that revolutionized Arab culture and set the stage for the Nahda.

Following the Maronite/Druze civil war of Mount Lebanon in 1860, al-Bustani, having witnessed these political/religious tensions, published an irregular newspaper which he called Nafir Suriyya (a Clarion of Syria), wherein he voiced his ideal of a Syrian fatherland. Along with instilling Syrian Patriotism and “proto-nationalism”, Al-Bustani sought to reform education and so founded the madrasah al-Wataniyya in Beirut in 1863, his own National School in Lebanon where he applied his theories on education, namely his educational agenda. The National School educated its students in Arabic, French, English, Turkish, Latin and Greek and modern sciences without the pretense of religion but with an obvious nationalistic aim. Al-Bustani welcomed students from all religions and races and qualified staff not based on their religious standing but on their competence and professional qualities. The school was successful because it was unique in Syria at the time as being an educational institution based on secular ideals of equality and non-discrimination and thus stood against the religious schools that were closed off to the modern world. However, the rising religious solidarity in Syria eventually led to it being closed in 1878.

It was during the proceeding years throughout the 1860s that his major contributions to the Nahda emerged. These included a daily newspaper and the first Arabic encyclopedia Muhit al-Muhit (The Ocean of Oceans) and an Arabic dictionary dairat al-ma’arif (dictionary of knowledge). Al-Bustani's intention in these works was to form a common body of knowledge which, though very French, was considered universal. It was at this time that he came to be known famously as the Master and Father of the Arabic Renaissance. The greater part of his life's work was reviving and creating a love for the Arabic language, bringing Arabic into a place of affluence and utility as a tool for Arabs to express their thoughts and ideas in the modernising world of the 19th century. He believed that openness towards European scientific discoveries would help the Middle East to take its proper position in the world. In 1868, al-Bustani helped found the Syrian Scientific Society al-Ja’miyya al-Ilmiyya al-Suriyya, a group of intellectuals who would be a part of promoting the study of science in educational institutions in Syria.

Al-Bustani made large strides in forging a nationalism for Arabs by adopting and contextualizing European political and social values and education while maintaining a distinct nationalism, patriotism and Arab identity. All of this was to the advancement and continuation of the Arab cultural and literary renaissance at large that moved from Egypt to Syria/Lebanon. The reforms in the Ottoman Empire (see Tanzimat) from 1839–1876 and the work of the Young Ottomans strongly influenced al-Bustani to see that “Ottomanism” was the best means of achieving nationalism politically being that it was the closest model available for him in Syria and in particular it was a Romantic nationalism, whereby one must recreate or recover a culture by looking into the past. In Al-Bustani's case, he looked to the scientific revolution in the Golden Age of Islam under the Abbasid Caliphate in Baghdad (8th to 13th century A.D.) He argued that at that time, Europe was in the decline of the Dark Ages and that Arabs must once again reclaim that heritage. However, it wasn't an Islamic heritage Bustani was after for he was a secularist. Though a Protestant Christian, he did not seek religious reform but rather a reform similar to what the French had with the separation of the Church institutions from the State institutions. It was this very separation that was key for the European Renaissance and al-Bustani saw the same need for the Nahda. Al-Bustani viewed the edicts of the Young Ottomans as freedom for non-Muslims and an opportunity for Arabs in Syria to gain sovereignty. Thus politically, he helped Syria towards Ottomanism in the sense that the edicts allowed participation of citizens of the state regardless of religious affiliation.

Education, for Bustani, was the main vehicle to achieve an Arab identity and nationalism and it was only by the mass production of literature and its speedy circuit throughout the Middle East, afforded by the Nahda, that such an identity could be formed. Al-Bustani's years in the Protestant Mission led him to be at odds with educating a people about remote places and histories clearly seen in a quote from a lecture of his on education, "there should be one educational system for (all) the children of the nation (‘Umma), to safeguard its (cultural) identity. Thus in the realm of education, Bustani helped pave the way for a distinctly Arab education. His national/secular educational agenda in the midst of religious education was paramount to Syria's development. Al-Bustani's contributions to Arab language and literature and his creation of a medium and structure to spread his ideas and the ideas of other intellectuals in Syria led to great reforms of literature and moreover created a common body of knowledge for the Arab, a body that was a pre-requisite to modernity and Arab and also, some state, Syrian nationalism. Butrus al-Bustani stands among the reformers who helped push the Middle East into modernity without seeing the reform as primarily Islamic. For he took a non-sectarian approach and worked to bring together both Christians and Muslims into the greater agenda of the revolution of Arab identity and culture.

== Achievements ==
In the social, national and political spheres, he founded associations intending to form a national élite and launched a series of appeals for unity in his magazine Nafir Suriya.

In the educational field, he taught in the schools of the Protestant missionaries at ‘Abey before founding his own National School in 1863 on secular principles. At the same time, he compiled and published several school textbooks and dictionaries to become known famously as the Master and Father of the Arabic Renaissance.

Al-Bustani compiled an Arabic dictionary and published eleven volumes of an Arabic encyclopedia with the help of his sons. He wished to spread awareness and appreciation for the Arabic language, hoping to promote the cultural significance of the Middle East in the modern world.

In the cultural/scientific fields, he published a fortnightly review and two daily newspapers. In addition, he began work, together with Drs Eli Smith and Cornelius Van Dyck of the American Mission, on a translation of the Bible into Arabic known as the Smith-Van Dyke translation. As an alternative to the Ottoman state schools and the missionary schools he founded the National School in Beirut, which offered secular education in the Arabic language. in Beirut.

His prolific output and groundbreaking work led to the creation of modern Arabic expository prose. While educated by Westerners and a strong advocate of Western technology, he was a fierce secularist, playing a decisive role in formulating the principles of Syrian nationalism (not to be confused with Arab nationalism).

Stephen Sheehi states that al-Bustani's "importance does not lay in his prognosis of Arab culture or his national pride. Nor is his advocacy of discriminately adopting Western knowledge and technology to 'awaken' the Arabs’ inherent ability for cultural success (najah) unique among his generation. Rather, his contribution lies in the act of elocution. That is, his writing articulates a specific formula for native progress that expresses a synthetic vision of the matrix of modernity within Ottoman Syria."

== Works on education ==
- 'Discourse on Education Given at the National School.' In: Al-Jinan (Beirut), no. 3, 1870.
- 'The National School.' In: Al-Jinan (Beirut), no. 18, 1873.
- 'Discourse on Science among the Arabs', Beirut, 15 February 1859.
- 'Discourse on the Education of Women', given in 1849 at the meeting of members of the Syrian Association and published in the Actes de l'Association syrienne, Beirut, 1852.
- 'Discourse on Social Life', Beirut, 1869.
- Boutros al-Boustani. Textes choises. With a commentary by Fouad Ephrem al-Boustani. Beirut, Publications de l'Institut des Lettres Orientales, 1950. (Collection Al Rawai')
- The writings and speeches of Butrus al-Bustani, either in published or manuscript form, are preserved in the 'Yafeth' Library at the American University of Beirut and available to readers and researchers.

=== Early educational works ===
- The Van Dyck Version of the Bible – the Arabic translation of the Bible
- Muhit al-muhit – the Arabic Dictionary
- Da'irat al-Ma'arif – an Arabic Encyclopedia, 1876
- Nafir Suriyya – a magazine

== Associations ==
Al-Bustani along with Nasif –al-Yajizi and Mikhail Mishaqa played a crucial role in the founding of three associations:

- the Syrian Association (1847–52)
- the Syrian Scientific Association (1868)
- the Secret Association (1875)

== Masonic activities ==
He belonged around 1865 to the first lodge of Lebanese Freemasonry, the lodge "Palestine N ° 415" in the East of Beirut, lodge founded in Beirut in May 1861 by the Grand Lodge of Scotland.

== See also ==
- Nu'man al-Qasatili, a protege of Bustani and major novelist of the Nahda
