= Jurji Zaydan =

Lebanese novelist, journalist, editor and teacher (1861–1914)

Jurji Zaydan جرجي زيدان
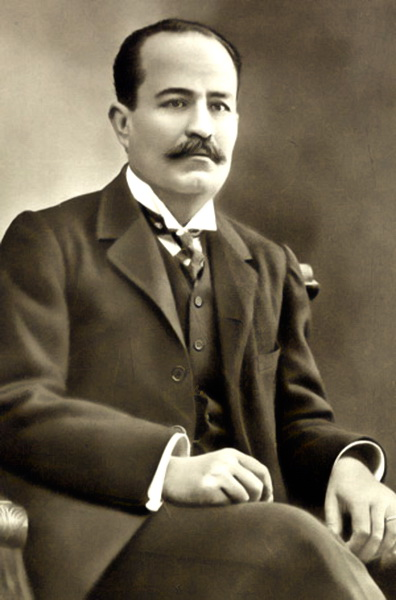
- Born: December 14, 1861; Beirut Vilayet, Ottoman Syria (present-day Lebanon)
- Died: July 21, 1914 (aged 52); Cairo, Egypt
- Occupations: Writer, novelist, journalist, editor and teacher
- Writing career
- Literary movement: Pan-Arabism

Jurji Zaydan (Note: Also transliterated Jorge Zaydân, Georgie Zeidan, or Jirjî Zaydan.) (Arabic: جرجي زيدان, ALA-LC: Jurjī Zaydān; December 14, 1861 – July 21, 1914) was a prolific Lebanese novelist, journalist, editor and teacher, most noted for his creation of the magazine Al-Hilal, which he used to serialize his twenty three historical novels.

His primary goal, as a writer and intellectual during the Nahda, was to make the common Arabic population know their own history through the entertaining medium of the novel. He has enjoyed a widespread popularity. He is also considered to have been one of the first thinkers to help formulate the theory of Arab nationalism.

== Early life ==
Jurji Zaydan was born on December 14, 1861, in Beirut to an Eastern Orthodox Christian family of limited means that had probably originated in the Hauran region. His father owned a restaurant and, being illiterate and uneducated himself, placed little importance on education. Zaydan dropped out of school after he completed an elementary education to help his father run the business.

However, he maintained a desire to educate himself by attending night classes in English until, in 1881, at the age of 20, he was admitted to the Syrian Protestant College as a medical student. He developed an interest in concepts of individualism such as laissez-faire economics, the Freemason belief in a universal enlightenment, and social Darwinism. He was particularly influenced by Samuel Smiles's book, Self-Help (published in 1859) to which he felt he could relate because of its emphasis on a rags-to-riches success story built upon hard work and perseverance. Furthermore, the book's focus on individualism and the self, a relatively new theme in Arab intellectual thought, would be a common theme in Zaydan's later historical novels.

He attended the university around the same time as Yaqub Sarruf (1852–1927), who first translated Self-Help into Arabic and would later found the magazine Al-Muqtataf (The Elite, 1876) with whom he shared ideals of modernizing the Arab world and emphasis on individual success through hard work.

Cornelius Van Dyck, an American professor of pathology at the Syrian Protestant College known for his translation of the Bible into Arabic in 1847, first encouraged Sarruf to translate Self-Help. He also influenced Zaydan's worldview, leading him to adopt the idea that education was the most important factor for the progress and development of a people. Such widespread education could be reached only by widespread internal reform and modernization of all aspects of Arab government and daily life. Zaydan thus became critical of contemporaries such as Egyptian Mustafa Kamil Pasha and Ahmed Orabi, who were concerned solely with gaining independence from Western influence. Zaydan argued that reform must precede independence to ensure its success.

In 1882, Professor E. Lewis was fired from the Syrian Protestant College for lightly praising Charles Darwin in a speech that he made to students of the college. Because the concept of Darwinism was highly controversial in Protestantism, the school had forbidden its inclusion in any curriculum. The firing led to mass protests amongst the students, many of whom left or were expelled for rebelling.

Additionally, many of the European pastors running the college were beginning to favour English over Arabic as the language of education. Zaydan was among those who left Syria for Cairo, where many Lebanese intellectuals and members of the Nahda had already relocated as a reaction to increased Ottoman suppression.

After a short stint in the Medical School of 'Ain Shams' and a military expedition with the British army to the Sudan, he turned his focus to developing his writing career.

Yaqub Sarruf began publishing al-Muqtataf in 1876 with help from Cornelius Van Dyck and his Syrian Protestant College classmates Faris Namir and Shahin Makarius. The magazine was concerned primarily covering modern scientific advancements, the first to do so in the Arab world, and it was known particularly known for its controversial coverage of the theory of evolution and Darwinism in the early 1880s.

== Career ==
After briefly serving as assistant editor for al-Muqtataf, Zaydan began producing scholarly works on various historical topics. His interest in history propelled him to travel to London to research Arabic history in the library of the British Museum.

His first book was published in 1889 with Ta'rikh al-Masuniya al-Amm in which he aimed to correct misconceptions about the Freemasons of which he was a member of the "Le Liban" lodge. The Freemason belief that universal knowledge existed and should be available to every person appealed to intellectuals like Zaydan as well as their quest to tap into this knowledge.

In 1890, he published al-Ta'rikh al-'Alamm (History of the World), a rather thin history of Asia and of Africa with a focus on the Middle East. Still, it is cited as one of the first non-Islamic histories to be written in Arabic, marking a turning point in the development of modern Arab education. Before, the entirety of Arab history had been recorded by the ulama, the religious scholars of the Caliphate. It was the first attempt at recording a nonreligious version of Middle Eastern history.

He then taught Arabic and opened a publishing house that he named Dar al-Hilal (House of the Crescent). His professional and personal life took a turn in 1891, with his marriage to Maryam Matar and the publication of his first historical novel, al-Mamluk al-Shariid (The Fleeing Mamluk). The novel met with such broad success that he was able to quit his teaching job. He would continue to steadily produce roughly one novel a year until his death in 1914.

He began publishing his most influential project, the magazine Al-Hilal (The Crescent) in 1892. It originally contained five sections: a history of the most famous men and events; articles by him or other writers, serialization of his historical novels, monthly events and world news of Egypt and Syria, and eulogies and criticism about mostly contemporary literature. With its focus on informing the public about Islamic history and new concepts within Western civilization, the magazine often took on an encyclopedic tone.

His primary aim remained steady throughout his publication of Al-Hilal and his historical novels: to provide the common Arabic people with an accurate sense of their own history in an accessible, entertaining way. Historical accuracy thus took firm precedence over plot and character development in each of his novels, and he was often critical of Western writers who bent historical fact to fit their literature, claiming such liberties misled the general public.

== Historical novel ==
Zaydan would typically write his annual novel during the summer months when al-Hilal was not published to begin its serialisation in the fall. Every novel but one had an almost identical frame.

He would begin each one by picking a historical topic. Though his novels did not follow a logical timeline, they were all centered on some aspect of Islamic history. Next, he would read all available sources on the topic in order to gain the most thorough understanding possible. Then, he would build a skeleton outline based entirely on historical fact. Finally, he would dream up characters and a romance through which he would relate the history.

The scholar's accuracy with which he approached each novel is further demonstrated by his frequent inclusion of documented sources, frequent footnotes and introductory chapters that provided historic, cultural and geographic context to the historic event of choice. The entertainment aspect came in with a love story between fictitious characters and a mystery of some sort to maintain reader interest. His plots were often weak, relying mostly on convenient coincidences between characters to drive the love story and mystery, with almost all of his novels ending in a happy ending.

His characters were often one-dimensional, with no insight given on their skills, background or their view of the time, institutions or society of which they were. Because he would present all character traits and personalities within the first mention of each character, character development was never present. The static characters, coupled with his straightforward, journalistic style were ideal for relating an objective and accurate history in the clearest way possible to the broad Arab public.

Along with providing the general population with education, he also aimed to develop "philosophy of language", which has the explicit purpose of informing, educating and enlightening. He was critical of writing that was accessible to only a small group of people, especially the esoteric language in religious scholarship. Because of the 10% literacy rate among men and 0.05% among women of the time, such gilded language was largely inaccessible to the general public. The introduction of the novel, especially one written in simple, clear language, is particularly noted for shifting the act of reading from the scholarly elite to the individual.

== Death and impact ==
In 1910, the newly opened Egyptian University offered Zaydan a professorship in Islamic History, which Zaydan accepted only reluctantly because of his unpopularity amongst conservative Muslims. He was dismissed before beginning in response to significant outcry from the Muslim public, who objected to his Christian origins and secular leanings.

Zaydan's secular take on history was particularly controversial in Tarikh al-Tamaddun al-Islam (The History of the Islamic Civilization, published 1901–1906), in which he offers a critical secular reading of Islamic history in at least five volumes. The experience embittered him until his unexpected death in 1914.

Leaving behind a legacy that includes 23 published novels, numerous scholarly works, and a magazine then circulated in Persia, India, Japan, Western Africa, Zanzibar, Australia, New Zealand, the West Indies, and North and South America, he was one of the most prolific and renowned Arab writers of the time. His impact left a lasting impression on the general Arab population as well as such literary giants as Taha Hussein, Naguib Mahfouz and poet Fadwa Tuqan.

Beyond the amount of work that he produced in his life though, there is the shift in thinking he brought to the Nahda and those who followed it. Because the Arabic novel was written in an accessible language, individualized education took a huge step away from the religious elite and towards the general population. His printing press greatly aided in this attempt to spread new knowledge and ideas to people of all backgrounds.

== Major works ==
=== History ===
- 1889: Tarikh al-Masuniya al-'Amm (General History of the Freemasons)
- 1890: Tarikh al-'Amm (The General History of the World)
- 1899: Tarikh al-Yunan wa al-Ruman (History of Greece and Rome)
- 1901–1906: Tarikh al-Tamaddun al-Islami 5 vols. (History of Islamic Civilization)
- 1907: al-'Arab qabl al-Islam (Arabs before Islam)
- 1907: al-Rih'lat al thlath (The three trips: historic accounts from visits to Istanbul, Europe, and Palestine)
- 1910–1913: Tarikh Adab al-luga al-'Arabiya 4 vols. (The History of Arabic Literature)
- 1912: Ṭabaqāt al-umam aw Al-salāʼil al-basharīyah (The Generations of the Nations, or the Descendants of Humanity)

=== Autobiography ===
- 1966: Mudakkirat Gurgi Zaidan (The Life of Jurji Zaydan)

=== Magazine ===
- 1892–1914: Al Hilal (the Crescent) vol. I-XXII

=== Novels ===
- 1891: al-Mamluk al-Sariid (The Fleeing Mamluk)
- 1892: Asir al-Mutamahdi (The Captive of the Mahdi Pretender)
- 1893: Istibdad al-Mamalik (Despotism of the Mamluks)
- 1893: Jihad al-Muhibbin
- 1896: Armanusa al-Misriyya (Egyptian Armanusa)
- 1897/98: Fatat Ghassan (Girls of Ghassan)
- 1899: 'Adra Quraish (Virgin of Quraish)
- 1900: 17 Ramadan
- 1901: Ghadat Karbala (Battle of Karbala)
- 1902: al-Hajjaj ibn Yusuf
- 1903: Fath al-Andalus (Conquest of Andalusia)
- 1904: Sharl wa 'Abd al-Rahman (Charles Martel and Abd al-Rahman)
- 1905: Abu Muslim al-Khurasani (Abu Muslim Khorasani)
- 1906: al-'Abbasa ukht al-Rashid (Abbasa Sister of Harun al-Rashid)
- 1907: al-Amin wa al-Ma'mun (al-Amin and al-Ma'mun)
- 1908: 'Arus Farghana (Bride of Farghana)
- 1909: Ahmad ibn Tulun
- 1910: 'Abd al-Rahman al-Nasir
- 1911: al-Inqilab al-'Uthmani (the Ottoman Revolution)
- 1912: Fatat al-Qairawan (Girls of Qairawan)
- 1913: Salah al-Din al-Ayyubi (Saladin)
- 1914: Shajarat al-Durr (The Pearl Tree)

== Translations ==
Until recently, Zaydan's works were not available in English, but they have been translated in a dozen other languages. The Zaidan Foundation, set up by his grandson dr. George Zaidan to promote Arab culture, has commissioned translations of five of his twenty-two historical novels. The work began in 2009, and the books were released in 2011 and 2012.

- The Conquest of Andalusia (Fath al-Andalus). Translation by Professor Roger Allen (UPenn). October 2011.
- The Battle of Poitiers (or Charles Martel and 'Abd al- Rahman). Translated by Professor William Granara (Harvard). December 2011.
- The Caliph's Sister – Harun al-Rashid and the Fall of the Persians (al-Abbasa Ukht al-Rashid). Translated by Professor Issa J. Boullata (McGill). February 2012.
- The Caliph's Heirs – Brothers at War: the Fall of Baghdad (al-Amin wal-Ma'mun). Translated by Professor Michael Cooperson (UCLA). February 2012.
- Saladin and the Assassins (Salah al-Din al-Ayyubi). Translated by Professor Paul Starkey (Durham University). April 2012.

Also in 2011, the translator Samah Selim translated Zaydan's novel Shajarat al-Durr into English. It won the Arkansas Arabic Translation Award.

== Sources ==
- Cachia, Pierre. "Literature: Arabic." Encyclopedia of the Modern Middle East and North Africa. 2nd ed. Vol. 3. New York: Macmillan Reference USA, 2004. 1418-422. Gale Virtual Reference Library. Gale, Cengage Learning, 2004. Web.
- Moosa, Matti. The Origins of Modern Arabic Fiction. Washington, D.C.: Three Continents, 1983. Print.
- Philipp, Thomas, and Jirji Zaydan. Gurgi Zaidan: His Life and Thought. Beirut: Orient-Institut, 1979. Print.
- Philipp, Thomas. Jurji Zaidan and the Foundations of Arab Nationalism. New York: Syracuse University Press, 2014.
- Reid, Donald M. "Syrian Christians, the Rags-to-Riches Story, and Free Enterprise." International Journal of Middle East Studies 1.4 (1970): 358–67.
- Sheehi, Stephen. "Doubleness and Duality: Jurji Zaydan's Al-Mamluk Al-Sharid and Allegories of Becoming." Journal of Arabic Literature 30.I (1999): 90–105. Index Islamicus. Academic Search Complete. Web.
- Ware, L. B. "Women's Emancipation in the Middle East: Jurji Zaydan's View." Journal of South Asian and Middle Eastern Studies 2.Iv (1979): 38–55. Index Islamicus. Web.

== Works ==
- Yaʻqūb Ṣarrūf (1893). al-Muqtaṭaf, Volume 17.
