= Al-Hilal (magazine) =

Egyptian cultural and literature magazine

Al Hilal
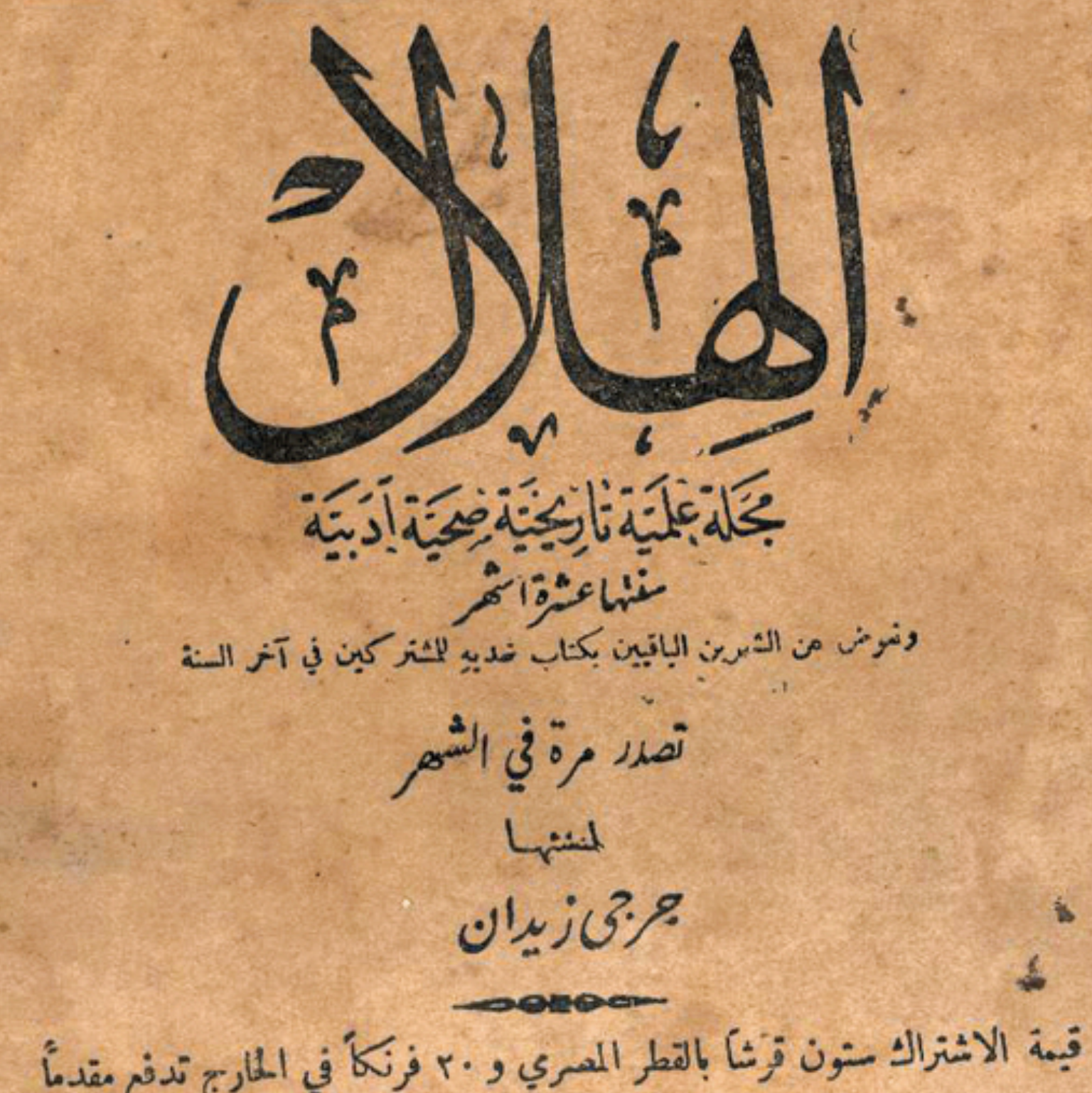
- Editor-in-chief: Mohamed Al Shafei
- Former editors: Helmy Al Namnam
- Categories: Cultural magazine; Literary magazine
- Frequency: Monthly
- Publisher: Dar Al Hilal Publishing House
- Founder: Jurji Zaydan
- Founded: 1892; 133 years ago
- Country: Egypt
- Based in: Cairo
- Language: Arabic
- OCLC: 1639361

Al-Hilal (Arabic: الهلال, lit. 'the crescent') is a monthly Egyptian cultural and literature magazine founded in 1892. It is among the oldest magazines dealing with arts in the Arab world.

== History and profile ==
Al-Hilal was founded in 1892 by Jurji Zaydan, a journalist and historical novelist from Beirut who had come to Egypt in the 1880s. The first issue of the monthly was published in September 1892. After Jurji Zaydan's death the journal was edited by his sons, Emile and Shukri Zaydan. Shortly after its start Al-Hilal managed to be a popular literary magazine along with the popular science magazine Al Muqtataf.

The magazine, published in Arabic, is based in Cairo. It is one of the state-owned publications in the country. State-run Dar Al Hilal Publishing House is the publisher of the magazine.

Past issues of Al-Hilal were digitized by the Bibliotheca Alexandrina. In addition, the publisher also archived the past issues of the magazine and of other publications. South Korean news agency the AsiaN and the magazine initiated a cultural partnership to support the cooperation in the fields of culture and media.

Al Hilal has inspired many Arabic magazines, including Al Nafais Al Asriyyah launched in Jerusalem in 1908.

== Editors and contributors ==
On 30 March 2011 Helmy Al Namnam became the editor-in-chief of Al Hilal. The next editor-in-chief of the magazine was Mohamed Al Shafei.

One of the earliest contributors was May Ziadeh, a Palestinian feminist writer. Another contributor was Aisha Abel Rahman, an author and professor of literature. She published articles under the pseudonym Bint al Shati. Her articles and others in Al Hilal were supportive of the United Arab Republic. Mansur Fahmi and Salama Moussa also contributed to the magazine. Ahmad Amin regularly contributed to Al Hilal from 1933 to his death in 1954.

== See also ==
- List of magazines in Egypt
