= Faris Nimr =

Lebanese journalist and intellectual (1856–1951)

- Born: 1856; Hasbaya, Ottoman Empire
- Died: 1951 (aged 94–95); Cairo, Egypt
- Education: New York University
- Occupation: Journalist
- Known for: Co-founder of Al Muqattam

Faris Nimr (Arabic: فارِس نِمْر; 1856–1951), was a pioneer Lebanese journalist and intellectual. He cofounded Al Muqattam, an Arabic, Cairo-based newspaper.

== Early life and education ==
Nimr was born in 1856 in Hasbaya, Ottoman Empire. He hailed from a Protestant family. His father was killed in the 1860 civil conflict in Mount Lebanon, and he moved with his mother to Beirut, then to Jerusalem. They returned to Hasbaya in 1868.

Nimr graduated from the Syrian College in Beirut in 1874, and worked at the newly created Lee Observatory under Doctor Cornelius Van Dyck, before becoming the observatory manager himself. In 1890 he graduated with a doctorate in philosophy from New York University.

== Career and activities ==
Following his graduation Nimr worked at the American College in Beirut as a lecturer. There he taught chemistry, and one of his pupils was Ilyas Matar. he was a member of the free mason organization. In 1876, he founded the monthly Arabic popular science magazine Al Muqtataf with Yaqub Sarruf in Beirut. They both moved to Cairo in late 1884 where they continued publishing Al-Muqtataf with great success. They managed to restart the magazine after they were permitted to resume its publication by the British authorities in Egypt.

In 1889, Nimr founded Al Muqattam, an Arabic, Cairo-based daily newspaper with Yaacoub Sarrouf and Shahin Makaryus. He became member of the Egyptian Senate. As of 1918 Nimr was a member of the Syrian Welfare Committee of which other members included Suleiman Nasif, Haqqi al-Azm, Rafiq al-Azm and Fawzi al-Bakri.

== Personal life and death ==
One of Nimr's daughters, Katie, married George Antonius, an author and historian. British diplomat Sir Walter Smart married his another daughter, Amy. Nimr's sister, Maryam, married Shahin Makariyus who was a merchant and the founder of a magazine entitled Al Lataif.

Nimr died in 1951.
