= Salim Qub'ayn =

Palestinian journalist (1870–1951)

- Born: 1870; Nazareth
- Died: 1951 (aged 80–81); Cairo
- Citizenship: Ottoman Empire (1870–1918); Syrian Arab Kingdom (1918–1920); Mandatory Palestine (1920–1948); Jordan (1948–1951)
- Occupation(s): Writer, translator, journalist

Salim Qabain (1870–1951) was a Palestinian teacher, journalist, writer, historian, and translator. He is considered one of the most important Palestinian and Arab literary figures, especially in translation, and one of the first Arab translators who introduced the Arab reader to Russian literature, as he was nicknamed "The Dean of Translators from Russian."

== Biography ==
Salim Qabain was born in 1870 in Nazareth in Palestine and completed his studies at the Russian School in Nazareth. After graduating, he worked in the teaching profession and was known for his fondness for writing and literature. He published his commentary on what he read in the university magazine founded by Farah Antun in Alexandria. He joined the Arab opposition movement against the Ottomans and was forced to flee and seek refuge in Egypt in 1897 due to the threat. He taught Arabic in several institutes and schools in Egypt and continued to publish his research in Al Muqattam, Al Mu'ayyad, and Al Mahrousa newspapers. In Cairo, he published several newspapers, including Al-Usbu' 1900, The Bride of the Nile 1903, and Al Ikha 1924. He also published a series of novels, the first published in 1909. Selim used to take a trip every year and publish his thoughts and observations on this trip upon his return.

Selim is one of the personalities who introduced the Arab reader to the great Russian writers such as Maxim Gorky, Tolstoy, Pushkin, and others during his translation of many of their books and his analysis of this literature and linking the Arab reader to it. Selim is one of the Arab writers who witnessed the Baha'i religion's emergence and summarized what he knew of its principles and the history of some of its figures in his book "Abd Al-Baha and the Baha'i" published in 1922 by the Imran Press in Egypt. In addition, his book included a summarized history of its messenger with some of its figures, especially an explanation of the biography of the life of Ibn Baha'u'llah al-Arshad and the spiritual leader of the Bahais after him, Abd Al-Baha Abbas, summarizing his life in Palestine and his relationship with its people. The book also includes a description of Abd al-Baha's funeral and the fortieth anniversary of his death. Many Palestinian writers, notables, and others delivered the poems and sermons on these two occasions.

Selim also took care of the affairs of the orthodox Arabs who had suffered from the oppression and oppression of Greece and wanted to be independent of them and manage their affairs themselves. He established charitable societies for his sect that played noble roles, and because of his Arab nervousness, the Greeks made him resign from teaching and charitable work. He established the brotherhood printing press and called for Arabs and Christians to unite against the strange foreigner.

Selim died in 1951 in Cairo of complications from diabetes.

== Works ==
He has published several books, including:

• (1908), “Hikmat Alnabi Muhammad” (The Wisdom of the Prophet Muhammad): Leo Tolstoy, Cairo

• “Mahkamat Jahannam” (The Court of Hell): Leo Tolstoy (translated into Arabic)

• “Unshudat Alhukm” (Song of Judgment): Turgenev (translated)

• “Rabeeb Butras Alakbar Alrabi” (The Arab stepson of Peter the Great): Pushkin (translated)

• (1912), “Tareekh Al Romanof” (History of the Romanovs)

• (1929), “Masraa Alkaisar Nikola Althani Akhir Kayasirat Russia” (The death of Tsar Nicholas II, the last Czar of Russia)

• “Anwaa Algaram Fi Barees” (Kinds of Love in Paris) (Translated from Russian)

• “Kisas Russiya” (Russian stories): Pushkin, Gorky, and others

• (1904), “Mathhab Tulstuwi” (Tolstoy's doctrine)

• (1914), “Assultan Hassan Bimunasabat Tawaleehi Alsulta Fi Misir” (Sultan Hassan on the occasion of his assumption of power in Egypt)

• “Albahaeeya Wa Muasisuha” (The Baha'i Faith and its founders)

• (1912), “Tareekh Alharb Aluthmaniya Aleetaliya” (History of the Ottoman-Italian War), Cairo

• “Huqooq Almara Fi Alislam” (Women's rights in Islam)

• (1908), “Aldistur Walahrar” (Al-Dustour and Al-Ahrar), Cairo

• “Alsiyaha Fi Russia”( Tourism in Russia)

• “Nakhbu Aladab” (Toast to Literature): Maxim Gorky (translated)

• (1922), “Abdulbaha Wa Albahaiya” (Abdel-Baha and the Baha'i Faith), Al-Omran Press, Cairo

• (1924), “Kafa Tuhafid Ala Sihatik” (How to maintain your health)

• “Badaeh Alkhayal” (Badaa' Al-Khayal-Stories): Tolstoy, translated, Cairo Dr.T.

• “Nakhbun Min Mubtakarat Makseem Jorky” (Toast from Maxim Gorky's innovations): Cairo Dr. T. Biography
