= Lee Observatory =

Observatory in Beirut, Lebanon

- Organization: American University of Beirut
- Location: Beirut, Lebanon
- Coordinates: 33°54′1.96″N 35°28′47.29″E
- Altitude: 38 m (125 ft)
- Established: 1873

Telescopes
- telescope: 12 inch refractor
- telescope: 3-inch transit
- helioscope: Spectro-helioscope
- Detector: Cosmic Ray Detector

The Lee Observatory is an astronomical observatory on the campus of the American University of Beirut in Beirut, Lebanon. Opened in 1873, it is the first and the oldest observatory of the Middle East in modern times.

Nowadays the observatory has only an academic role.

== History ==
The Lee Observatory opened in 1873, with Doctor Cornelius Van Dyck as its pioneer. The observatory was named in reference to Henry Lee, a wealthy British merchant from Manchester, who had made a significant donation to help finance its construction. The observatory had twin roles of sky gazing and serving as a meteorological station for the middle east. Several directors and assistants managed the Observatory, including Van Dyck, who pursued astronomy as a hobby and had bought most of the equipment himself, and Professors Mansour Jurdak and Owen Gingerich, who organised the "Open Nights Observatory" events and made contributions to the observatory library.
