= Al Muqattam =

Egyptian newspaper (1888–1954)

- Founders: Faris Nimr; Khalil Thabet; Anton Najib Matar
- Editor-in-chief: Faris Nimr
- Founded: 18 April 1888
- Ceased publication: 11 November 1952 (last issue); 26 May 1954 (ban)
- Language: Arabic
- Headquarters: Cairo
- Country: Egypt

Al Muqattam (Arabic: المقطم) was a newspaper which was published in Cairo, Egypt, between 1888 and 1952. It was one of the leading papers until its closure by the Egyptian government in 1954. The title of the paper was a reference to a range of hills outside Cairo.

== History and profile ==
Al Muqattam was first published on 18 April 1888. The founders were three Christians: Faris Nimr, Khalil Thabet and Anton Najib Matar. The establishment of the paper was supported by Lord Cromer, colonial administrator of the British in Egypt. It produced only three issues until 14 February 1889 when it became a daily newspaper. The paper was affiliated with the Al Muqtafa Foundation. Its publishers were Syrian-origin Christians, Faris Nimr, Yaqub Sarruf and Shahin Makaryus. The latter also published a masonic journal entitled Al Lataif in Cairo between 1885 and 1896. Fares Nimr served as the editor-in-chief of Al Muqattam from its start to his death in 1951 and also edited its political content. In the early years Yaqub Sarruf edited the science content of the paper.

Al Muqattam had 3,000 subscribers in 1893. It was nearly six thousands like those of Al-Ahram and Al Mu'ayyad in 1897. The last issue of the paper was published on 11 November 1952. It was banned by the Minister of National Guidance led by Salah Salem on 26 May 1954.

== Content and political stance ==
The paper initially produced news based on the translations of the telegraph messages sent by the major news agencies such as Reuters and Havas. In fact, Al Muqattam was the first Egyptian paper which obtained these messages from the leading news agencies, and its London correspondent was one of the editorial members of the British daily newspaper Daily Mail. Ibrahim Al Muwaylihi's work entitled Ma Hunalik was first published in the paper and serialized between 28 June 1895 and 8 February 1896. During the British occupation of Egypt between 1892 and 1914, Al Muqattam held a pro-British political stance. Therefore, the paper was subject to frequent criticism and allegations that it was financed by the British authorities. Due to these criticisms there were tensions between Al Muqattam and another Cairo-based newspaper Al Muayyad which supported the independence of Egypt. A group led by Al Muayyad contributor Mustafa Kamil attacked the offices of Al Muqattam. In addition, the publishers of Al Muqattam were frequently mocked by the political satire magazine Al Siyassa Al Musawwara. Al Muqattam and Al Ahram which had a pro-Ottoman stance also became opponents from 1889.

Al Muqattam supported another event which also caused criticisms: migration of Jews to Palestine. In 1911 Nissim Malul, a Zionist activist, began to work as the correspondent of Al Muqattam in Haifa. The paper had a regular column on Palestine of which the editor was anonymous, and the articles were signed as “senior Zionist”. Salim Tamari, a Palestinian sociologist and writer, argues that the editor of the column was possibly Shimon Moyal, a Jaffa-born writer and Zionist. Following the end of the British rule in Egypt in 1914, Al Muqattam became known for its high-quality journalism and reformist stance. It was the first Arabic newspaper which published the text of the Balfour Declaration on 10 November 1917 which had been signed on 2 November.

In the early 1920s, Al Muqattam frequently attacked Saudi ruler Ibn Saud. These attacks had significant effects on Ibn Saud that he established a paper, Umm Al Qura, in Mecca in 1924 to counterweigh the negative propaganda of Al Muqattam. Nimr's son-in-law and British embassy official Sir Walter Smart published many pan-Arabist articles in the paper from the 1930s. The paper was among the publications which celebrated the termination of the construction of the Suez Canal Zone Barracks in March 1939 which had been demanded by the British authorities. Towards the end of its lifetime Al Muqattam had a relatively independent editorial approach.
