= Al Lataif =

Masonic magazine in Egypt (1885–1996)

- Categories: Political magazine
- Frequency: Monthly
- Founded: 1885
- Final issue: 1896
- Country: Khedivate of Egypt
- Based in: Cairo
- Language: Arabic

Al Lataif (Arabic: اللطائف) was a monthly Egyptian masonic publication which existed between 1885 and 1896. It was headquartered in Cairo.

== History and profile ==
Al Lataif was launched in Cairo in 1885 to improve the masonic activities in Egypt. Its editor and founder was Shahin Makariyus who was the husband of Maryam Nimr, sister of the journalist Faris Nimr. The magazine was published by Faris Nimr's publishing house which also owned a newspaper entitled Al Muqattam.

Al Lataif came out monthly and contained many articles about women, including biographies of leading women. It also covered writings about the search for progress, the defense of individual freedoms, rejection of the oppressive use of authority, respect for the laws that govern society, compassion for the weakest, and eventually respect for women. All these topics were discussed based on the principles of the freemasonry. The magazine played a significant role in the unveiling of the Egyptian women. The magazine also featured short stories.

Maryam Nimr was among the contributors of Al Lataif until her death in 1898. Another major contributors were Amir Amin Arslan and Salma Qusatli. Al Lataif folded in 1896.
