= Salim al-Bustani =

Lebanese journalist and writer (1847–1884)

- سليم البستاني
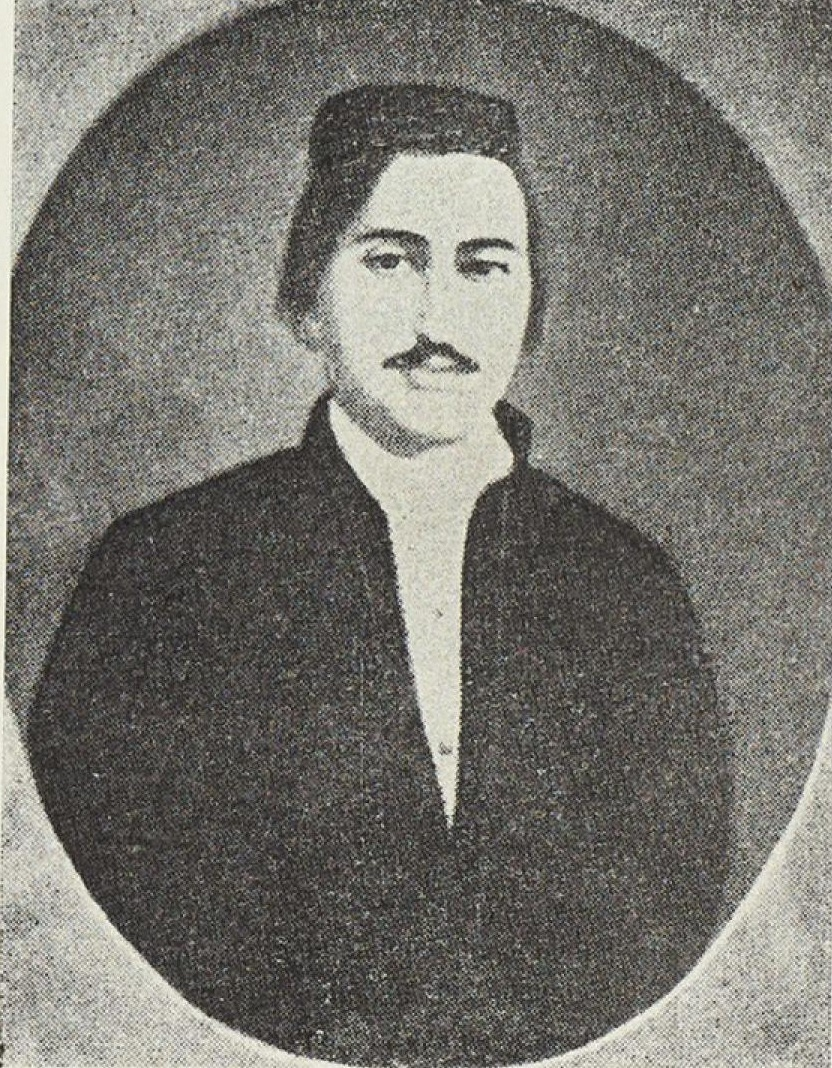
- Born: 28 December 1848; Abayh, Deir al-Qamar, Ottoman Syria
- Died: 19 September 1884 (aged 35); Bouarij, Zahlé, Ottoman Syria
- Resting place: Beirut
- Occupations: Translator, journalist, writer
- Movement: Nahda
- Spouse: Hannah Ayyub Thabit
- Children: 2
- Parents: Butrus al-Bustani (father); Rahil Ata (mother)

Salim al-Bustani (Arabic: سليم البستاني / ALA-LC: Salīm al-Bustānī; 1848–1884) was a Lebanese journalist, novelist and political figure who edited many publications with his father Butrus. He is known for being the pioneer of the genre of historical novel in Arabic.

== Early life and education ==
Bustani was born in a village, Abayh, in the northwest of Deir al-Qamar on 28 December 1848. He was the second eldest of Butrus al-Bustani and Rahil Ata's nine children. He studied French, English, Turkish and Arabic.

== Career and activities ==
At age 14 Salim became the translator at the American consulate in Beirut in 1862 succeeding his father in the post. Salim resigned from the post 1871 and began to work as an administrator of the National School founded by his father. There he also taught English, history and natural sciences.

Salim had been editing a newspaper, Al-Janna, established by him and Butrus in 1870. From 1871 he also edited the Al-Jinan magazine which was started by his father. His column in the magazine was titled Reform.

In addition, Salim was a member of various organizations. He was both a member and vice president of the Syrian Scientific Society. He also served as a member of the Eastern Scientific Society and the Municipality of Beirut.

== Personal life and death ==
Salim was married to Hannah Ayyub Thabit, a daughter of Salim Thabit who was a merchant. They had two children, a son and a daughter.

He died of heart attack at age 35 in the summer house of his father-in-law in Bouarij, Zahlé, on 19 September 1884. He was buried in Beirut after the funeral ceremony in the Protestant church.

=== Work and views ===
Salim was the author of the following historical novels: Al-Huyām fī jinān al-shām (1870; Arabic: Passion in Syrian Gardens), Zanubiya (1871) and Budur (1872). The first one which is about the conquest of Syria by Muslims in the 7th century and was serialized in al-Jinan was one of the earliest novels in Arabic. His other novels were also published in the same title.

Salim was part of the Nahda. His articles in Al-Jinan and in other publications attempted to make a synthesis between the Ottoman Sultan Abdulmejid's principle of the equality of the Ottoman citizens before the law and the Western concepts. Therefore, he focused on the following topics: division between religion and state and the establishment of a national bond without depending on religious sects and communal groups.

He harshly criticized economic imperialism of the Western countries and initiated a protest against the use of their products in 1870. He argued that there were significant damages caused by this since these countries bought raw materials from the Middle Eastern countries and sold the products made with these materials to the same countries. For him, this cycle was the major reason for the poverty of people and the destruction of local commercial activities.

In regard to the underdevelopment of the Arab nations Salim cited the lack of positivist knowledge as its cause which he regarded as the prerequisite for cultural and technological growth. He was one of the supporters of women's education which his mother, Rahil, attached importance. Salim stated "She who rocks the cradle with her left hand moves the world with her right." He was among the Lebanese intellectuals who advocated the idea of romantic love between individuals with freedom.
