= Da'irat al-Ma'arif =

Arabic encyclopedia

- Author: Butrus al-Bustani
- Original title: كتاب دائرة المعارف: وهو قاموس عام لكل فن ومطلب
- Language: Arabic

Kitāb Dāʼirat al-Maʻārif: wa-Huwa Qāmūs ʻĀmm li-Kull Fann wa-Maṭlab (Arabic: كتاب دائرة المعارف: وهو قاموس عام لكل فن ومطلب), often simply referred to as Dāʼirat al-Maʻārif, was an Arabic encyclopedia published by Butrus al-Bustani in 1875. It is considered the first modern encyclopedia published in Arabic.
