= Sarah Lanman Smith =

American Christian missionary and educator (1802-1836)

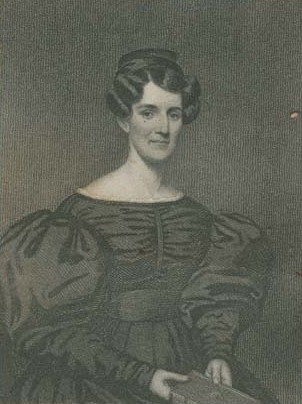
- Born: Sarah Lanman Huntington; June 18, 1802; Norwich, Connecticut, U.S.
- Died: September 30, 1836 (aged 34); Boojah, Smyrna, Ottoman Empire (modern-day Buca, İzmir, Turkey)
- Occupations: Missionary; memoirist; school founder
- Spouse: Eli Smith (m. 1833)
- Relatives: Jedediah Huntington (grandfather); Jonathan Trumbull (great-grandfather)
- Writing career
- Language: English
- Notable work: Memoir of Mrs. Sarah Lanman Smith

Sarah Lanman Smith (also known as Sarah L. Huntington Smith; June 18, 1802 – September 30, 1836) was a 19th-century American Christian missionary, memoirist, and school founder. In 1835, she established the American School for Girls, which became the Lebanese American University.

In 1830-1831, Smith (then Huntington) and Sarah Breed established and conducted a Sunday school among the Mohegan Native American tribe in Connecticut. In 1833, she married Rev. Eli Smith and they embarked for Beirut, via Malta and Alexandria. Five years later, in ill-health, she was wrecked on a voyage to Smyrna, but escaped in a boat, dying soon after. Her memoirs were published by Dr. Edward W. Hooker in 1839.

== Early life and education ==
Sarah Lanman Huntington was born in Norwich, Connecticut, on June 18, 1802. She was the daughter of Jabez Huntington, Esq. She grew up in Norwich, and was educated with missionary sympathies and feelings. One of her ancestors was John Robinson, of Leyden, who was from a long line of missionaries. Her paternal grandfather was Jedediah Huntington, a general in the Continental Army during the American Revolutionary War, high sheriff of New London, Connecticut, and one of the early members of the American Board of Commissioners for Foreign Missions. Her paternal grandmother, Mrs. Faith Huntington, was daughter of Jonathan Trumbull, who was Governor of Connecticut during the American Revolution; and whose brothers were Jonathan Trumbull Jr., also a governor of Connecticut; Colonel John Trumbull, the American painter; and Joseph Trumbull, commissary general of the Continental Army. Her maternal grandfather was Peter Lanman, Esq., of Norwich, a man of religious character; among whose ancestors, in the county of Plymouth, Massachusetts, were several individuals of eminent piety. Her maternal grandmother, the Sarah Spaulding Coit Lanman, whose name she bore. The Rev. Joshua Huntington, of the Old South Church, Boston, was a half-brother of her father. She was exceedingly attached to her friends. Her father was almost her idol. The affection for her mother, who died when Sarah was young, she transferred to her step-mother. Smith had a sister and three brothers.

Being of a delicate constitution when a child, there was some difficulty in training and governing her. A fond nurse, sometimes by injudicious kindness, did much to counteract the corrections of her parents. A protracted sickness when she was about six years old confined her to a cot by the fireside. During the first twelve years of her life, she was like other thoughtful and pleasant girls of her age, and spent her time in the amusements and pursuits of youth. At school she was industrious, studious, but not remarkably rapid in her progress. Her quick sensibilities were at this age often tortured by the extreme severity of a school-mistress, under whose instruction she was placed. In the minds of her parents, she never appeared to be a prodigy or a genius. At the age of twelve, her mind was drawn to divine things. She was aware of the work of missionaries such as Harriet Newell and Ann Hasseltine Judson. It was at the age of fifteen that she went to a boarding school in Boston, where she remained a year. After returning to her father's house, her life was spent surrounded by much company. At the age of eighteen, Smith made a visit abroad. On August 10, 1820, she felt converted and ceaselessly sought out ways in which she might do good to others.

== Career ==
=== The Mohegans ===
In 1827, she formed a plan to benefit the Mohegan, who lived a few miles from Norwich. These Native Americans were the remnant of a once mighty tribe. From hut to hut, she visited them in the forest, started a Sunday school, of which she and another young woman, Sarah Breed, were the sole teachers, and provided books for those who could read. Not satisfied with this, she determined to build a church (1830), and secure the services of a missionary. For this purpose, she wrote to several of her influential friends, to secure their cooperation and sympathy. For aid in her work, she also applied to the Connecticut General Assembly, and when that failed, she turned to United States Secretary of War. To a considerable extent, she was successful, and obtained the esteem and gratitude of the Mohegan. She usually rode from Norwich on horseback, and, taking a little girl with her into the saddle, passed from house to house, using the child as guide, interpreter, and adviser. When she met in the road a few Native Americans, or a group of men and women, she would stop her horse, and converse awhile with them. In this way, she gained the confidence and love of the people.

=== Syria ===
Smith thought about becoming a missionary in the western part of the United States. The idea of laboring in the West was abandoned in 1833, during which year she resolved to accompany Rev. Eli Smith to Syria. After consultation with her friends, she was married on July 21, in the midst of her associates, at Norwich. On August 29, Mrs. Smith left her childhood home, forever, and, after visiting the friends of her husband in Boston, embarked from that place for Malta, on September 21, in the brig George, commanded by Capt. William Hallett.

After a voyage of 54 days, the missionaries landed at Malta, and proceeded to Beirut, via Alexandria. They arrived at Beirut on the January 28, 1834. The sketch of their voyage given by Mrs. Smith herself, and found in her published memoir, documents their travels across the Atlantic, the Mediterranean Sea, the Azores, the coast of Africa, the Strait of Gibraltar, the stay at Malta, the visits to convents, temples, and other places of worship, the city of Alexandria, the grave of Parsons, the passage to Beirut, and their safe arrival. Though the people kindly welcomed them, the missionaries found a wide difference in the habits and customs of the European and the Arab, and, brought into connection with the latter, as they were every hour of the day, the contrast was continually before them. She had no house which she could properly call her own, for, at times, while she was least prepared, and while visits were least desirable, her house would be invaded by a company of five or six women, who would remain a long time, asking questions. But Mrs. Smith felt that these annoyances were to be endured with cheerfulness, and she would console herself that such privations and trials were parts of the missionary work. The situation of Mrs. Smith was not at all like that of many other missionaries. Hence, on her arrival, she found all the comforts and conveniences necessary, as well as a beautiful residence.

Smith studied and learned three languages: Arabic, French, and Italian. She spent most of the time in her school, which was established soon after her arrival, and for awhile was the only schoolmistress in all of Syria. The schoolhouse, which was erected upon a plan of her own, was filled by a large number of children of Egyptian, Arabian, and Turkish parents, who, under the care of their teacher, made considerable progress. Her residence among the Mohegans prepared her for her duties in Syria, and gave her the advantage of an experience. In the Sunday school, she instructed the 15 or 20 children who attended. Under her labors, the school gradually and constantly increased. She and her husband Eli adopted an eight-year Greek Orthodox student, Rahil Ata in 1834. In repeated instances, the Moslem parents kept their children under Smith's care after the school had been condemned.

One of the most pleasant circumstances connected with the missionary life of Mrs. Smith, was her visit to the Holy Land, in 1835. From early childhood, she had regarded the city of Jerusalem with a feeling of veneration. She traversed the mountains of Galilee, and stood upon the summits of Carmel, Gerizim, Tabor, Hermon, Lebanon, Olivet, and Calvary.

== Death and legacy ==
After visiting the prominent places of the Holy Land, Smith returned again to her station at Beirut, where she labored until June 1836, when her health failing, she set sail with her husband for Smyrna with the hope of regaining it. At this point, her suffering commenced. The vessel in which they sailed was old and uncomfortable. The fifth night after leaving Beirut, the vessel was wrecked on the north side of the island of Cyprus, and the voyagers barely escaped. Eventually, they landed on a sandy shore, in a destitute condition. They arrived at Smyrna in 33 days after they left Beirut. Here, her strength gradually failed. The consumption grew worse; and on September 30, 1836, she died at Boojah, Ottoman Empire, a small village about 5 miles (8.0 km) from Smyrna. On the following day, as word spread through Smyrna that Mrs. Smith died, the flags of the American vessels in the harbor were seen lowering to half-mast, and that upon the dwelling of the consul was shrouded with the drapery of death. On October 1, she was buried. Memoir of Mrs. Sarah Lanman Smith (1839) was written by Smith and edited after her death by Edward W. Hooker.

The American Board of Commissioners for Foreign Missions felt deeply the loss which had been sustained. The slab of marble which rises upon her grave bears an inscription:—

TO BENEVOLENT EFFORTS, FOR THE YOUTH AND THE IGNORANT OF HER NATIVE CITY; FOR THE NEGLECTED REMNANT OF ITS ABORIGINAL INHABITANTS; AND FOR THE BENIGHTED FEMALES OF SYRIA SHE DEVOTED ALL HER ARDENT, EXPANSIVE AND UNTIRING ENERGIES, AS A SERVANT OF CHRIST, UNTIL, SINKING UNDER MISSIONARY LABORS AT BEYROOT, SHE WAS BROUGHT HITHER, AND DIED IN TRIUMPHANT FAITH, SEPTEMBER 30, 1836, AGED 34.

At the Park Church, Norwich, the two dormer windows nearest the east transept were put in by E. B. Huntington as memorials of Deacon Jabez Huntington and his wife, and also to Smith.

== Selected works ==
- Memoir of Mrs. Sarah Lanman Smith (1839)
