= Al-Muqtataf (magazine) =

Arabic popular science magazine

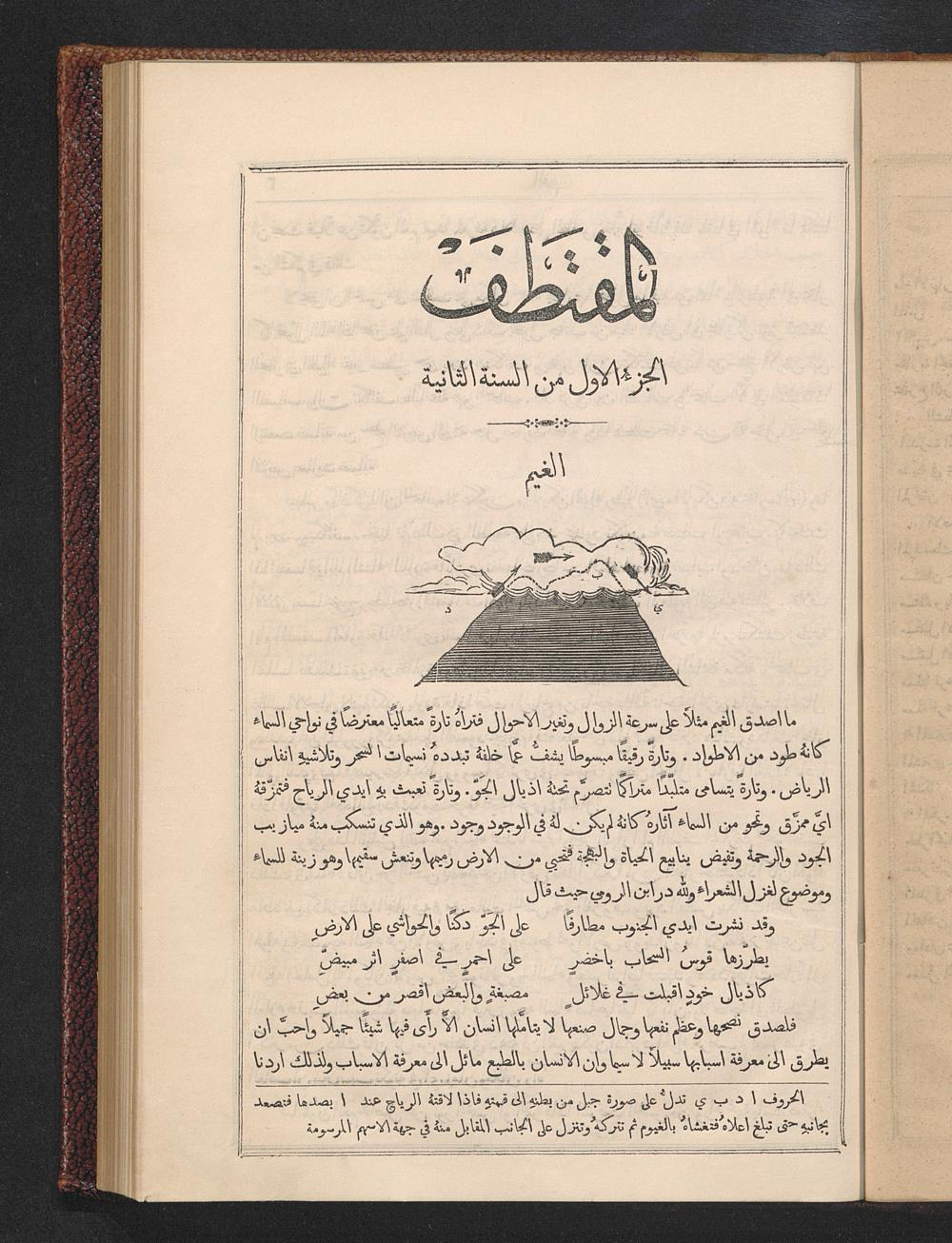
- Second volume of Al Muqtataf
- Categories: Science magazine
- Frequency: Monthly
- Publisher: Yaqʿūb Ṣarrūf; Fāris Nimr; Šāhīn Makāriyūs
- Founded: 1876
- Final issue: 1952
- Country: Lebanon; Egypt
- Based in: Beirut; Cairo
- Language: Arabic

Al-Muqtaṭaf (Arabic: المقتطف; DMG: al-Muqtaṭaf; English: "The Digest") was an Arabic journal of popular science. The journal was published monthly from 1876 to 1952 in Beirut and Cairo with a total of 121 issues. Along with Al-Manar and Al-Hilal, it was one of the Arab world's three most popular journals in the early 20th century.

== Publication history ==
Al-Muqtataf was founded in 1876 by the Arabic Christians Yaqūb Ṣarrūf (1852–1927) and Fāris Nimr (1856–1951) at the Syrian Protestant College (SPC, today American University of Beirut) in Beirut. Both of them graduated there with a Bachelor of Arts degree in science and worked afterwards as lecturers. Ṣarrūf, who had made a name himself as an important science journalist and promoter of the modern Arabic literature, was interested predominantly in scientific and literary topics. Nimr, on the other hand, dedicated himself additionally to current politics. The third publisher Šāhīn Makāriyūs (1853–1910) who was also a journalist, was responsible for the printing technology, and he developed this already in the production of the journals Našra al-Usbūʿīya (1871) and aṭ- Ṭabīb (1884–1885).

The publishing course was apparently not planned from the beginning since the volumes are not furnished with a date till the fourth year. The chronology was published until 1885 only according to Gregorian calendar later the Islamic dating was also added. Besides Syria and Egypt the issues were also distributed in Iraq, Iran, Yemen and were spread in numerous European countries, in the US, Canada, Latin America, Australia as well as in India and China.

In 1882, the journal attracted controversy when it published a speech by an SPC professor named Edwin Lewis. The speech made favorable references to Darwinism, and was opposed by religiously conservative authorities at SPC. In addition, another Christian journal Al-Bashir's editor Louis Cheikho harshly criticised the articles on Darwin published in Al-Muqtataf. The editors of Al-Muqtataf were accused of being atheists by Al-Bashir. The accusations of two journals each other lasted until 1884, and the incident became known not only in the region, but also in Europe. The problem was solved the same year only through the intervention of the Ottomans who asked the editors through the Directorate of Foreign Affairs and Publications in Beirut to stop accusing each other if they did not want to be subject to the bans or penalty. Such oppositions led Ṣarrūf and Nimr to migrate to Cairo in 1883 where they produced the journal in a private printing press owned by Makāriyūs. One of the contributors in Cairo was May Ziadeh, a Palestinian feminist writer. In addition, Ṣarrūf and Nimr published simultaneously the daily newspaper al-Muqaṭṭam (1889-1952), the monthly journal al-Laṭāʾif (1886-1896) and Ǧarīdat as-Sūdān (The Sudan Times, 1903) in Cairo.

Al-Muqtataf ended publication in 1952.

== Content ==
Al-Muqtaṭaf was not a political but rather an encyclopaedic journal that followed European and American examples. The New Yorker weekly journal American Artisan for "Arts, Mechanics, Manufactures, Engineering, Chemistry, Inventions and Patents" provided the logo of crossed hammer and feather, which was copied at the title page till the 1890s. At first the subheading was "ǧarīda ʿilmīya ṣināʿīya" ("journal for science and industry") which indicates that current politics was for the most part neglected.

The publishers' aim was to inform the reader in the Arab world about the Western scientific progress of that time and how to use that knowledge in one's daily life. The scientific and literary topics of the journal were varied. Articles on modern sciences were published, from anatomy to astronomy and from physics to veterinary medicine as well as agriculture and handicraft. Evolutionary theory and Darwinism obtained great significance in the first years of publication and resulted in excited discussions among the authors and readers. Cultural and social topics as well as literature gained over the time more relevance, and translations of European literature were increasingly published.

The rubric for disputation and correspondence (Bāb al-Munāẓara wa-l-Murāsala) and the column for questions and answers (Masāʿil wa-aǧwibatuhā) enabled and promoted social, scientific and political debates. Authors and readers could express their opinions, debate with other authors or ask questions. The importance of interaction with the readership is also evident in numerous reader surveys, its results were continuously published.

It was also important for the authors to complement the articles with numerous illustrations, first in black and white and from 1926 on for the first time coloured. From March 1885 a lot of advertisements appeared, from October 1886 they were published in Arabic and English in many pages for a wider public. All in all this encyclopaedic educational journal, the only one of its kind, had remarkable influence on numerous scientific, social and political debates in the Arab world. Due to its publications scientific fields, European literature as well as social topics could gain popularity and broadly be discussed.

== Influence ==
Al Muqtataf was used by other Arabic journals as a model, including Al Nafais Al Asriyyah launched in Jerusalem in 1908. Jurji Zaydan worked as an associate editor for the magazine before creating the magazine Al-Hilal.
