= Eli Smith =

American missionary (1801–1857)

Portrait of Eli Smith

Eli Smith (September 13, 1801 – January 11, 1857) was an American Protestant missionary and scholar.

== Biography ==
Smith was born in Northford, Connecticut, to Eli and Polly (née Whitney) Smith. He graduated from Yale College in 1821 and from Andover Theological Seminary in 1826. He worked in Malta until 1829, then in company with H. G. O. Dwight traveled through Armenia and Georgia to Persia. They published their observations, Missionary Researches in Armenia, in 1833 in two volumes. Smith settled in Beirut in 1833. The following year his wife Sarah opened the first girls' school in Lebanon, while William McClure Thomson opened a boy’s seminary in Beirut.

Along with Edward Robinson, he made two trips to the Holy Land in 1838 and 1852, acting as an interpreter for Robinson in his quest to identify and record biblical place names in Palestine, which was subsequently published in Robinson's Biblical Researches in Palestine.

He is known for bringing the first printing press with Arabic type to Syria. He went on to pursue the task which he considered to be his life's work: translation of the Bible into Arabic. He worked on this with the Arabic scholar and poet, Nasif al-Yaziji. Although he died before completing the task, the work was completed by C. V. Van Dyck of the Syrian Mission and published in 1860 to 1865.

== Family ==
Smith married three times. His first wife was Sarah Lanman Huntington, who was also a missionary. She died in 1836. In 1841 he married Maria Ward Chapin and they had a son named Charles; she died in 1842. He married Mehitable "Hetty" Simkins Butler on October 7, 1846, in Northampton, Massachusetts.

His daughter Mary Elizabeth Smith was educated at the female seminaries in Hartford, Connecticut, and Ipswich, Massachusetts, and taught at the Female Seminary at Mt. Auburn, Cincinnati. She was listed In the Women's Who's Who of America in 1914–15.

== Publications ==
Smith’s books include:

- Missionary Researches in Armenia (2 vols. Boston, 1833)
- Missionary Sermons and Addresses (1833)
