= Bouarij =

Bouarej بوارج
- Location in Lebanon
- Coordinates: 33°48′45″N 35°49′20″E
- Country: Lebanon
- Governorate: Beqaa Governorate
- District: Zahle District
- Elevation: 4,300 ft (1,310 m)

Population (2021)
  - Total: 3,250
- Time zone: UTC+2 (EST)
  - Summer (DST): +3

Bouarej (Arabic: بوارج, romanized: Bwārij, also spelled Bouarij, Bouârej, Buariji or Bwareg) is a village located on the eastern side of the Church Mountain, Beqaa.

== Population ==
Bouarij has 1,274 registered voters in the 2009 elections. The population follow Sunni Islam. In the municipal Lebanese elections of 2004, Bouarej counted 1,905 registered voters of which 1,141 voted. For the past 150 years, the village has been populated by four main families: Chahine, Jabr, Jaber and AlBast.
