= Khalil Beidas =

Palestinian writer

Khalil Beidas خليل بيدس
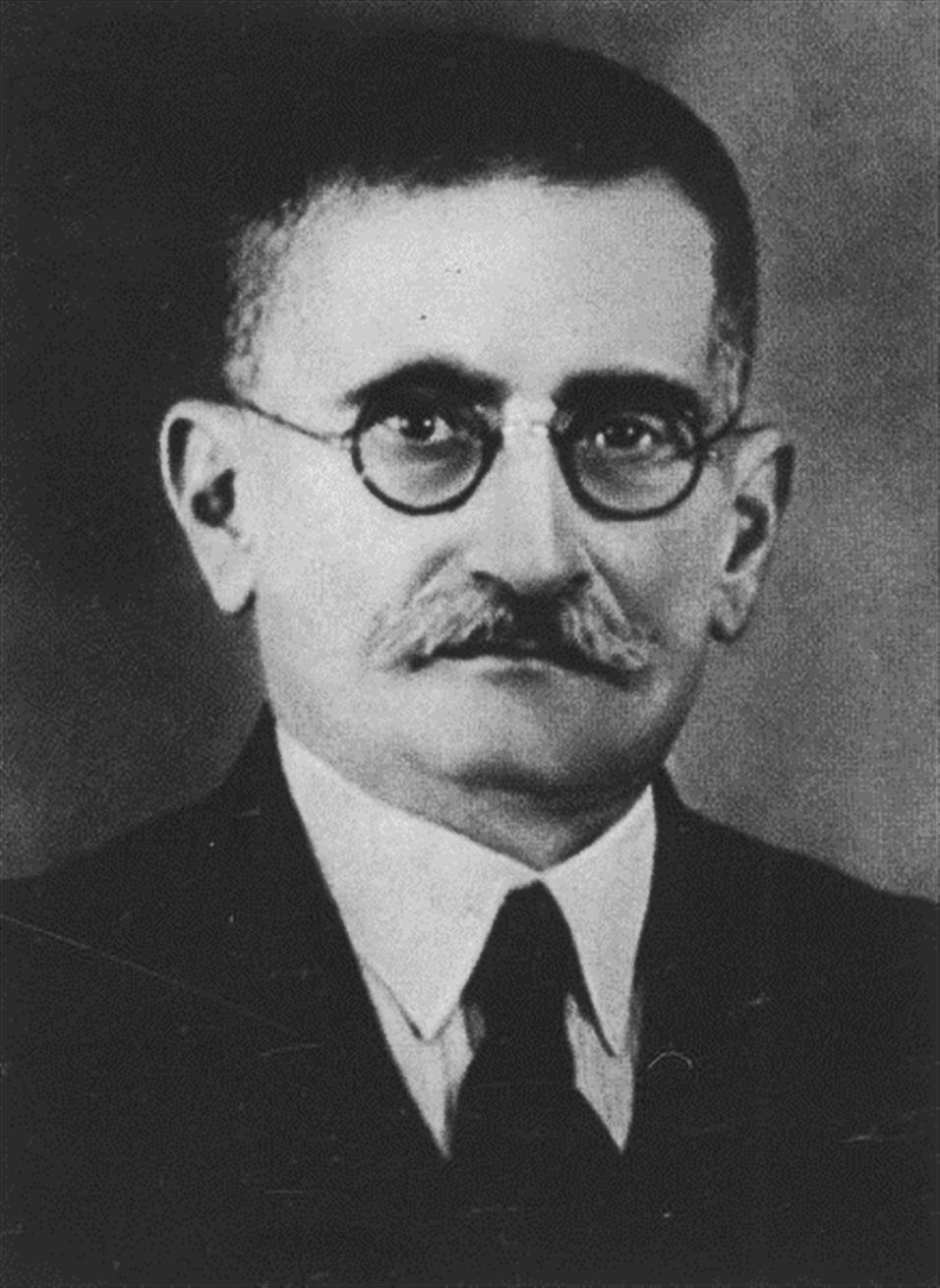
- Born: 1874; Nazareth, Sanjak of Acre, Ottoman Empire
- Died: 1949 (aged 74–75)
- Other name: The pioneer of Palestinian short-story
- Relatives: Yousef Beidas (son); Edward Said (1st cousin once removed)
- Writing career
- Language: Arabic

Khalil Beidas (Arabic: خليل بيدس, also transliterated Khalil Bedas, Khalil Baydas, Khalil Beydas) (1874–1949) was a Palestinian scholar, educator, translator and novelist. Beidas was the father of Palestinian Lebanese banker Yousef Beidas and was a cousin of Edward Said's father.

Alongside contemporaries such as Khalil al-Sakakini, Izzat Darwaza and Najib Nassar, Beidas was one of Palestine's foremost intellectuals in the early twentieth century (Note: "one of Palestine's foremost intellectuals in the early twentieth century." (Büssow 2011, p. 67)) during the Al-Nahda cultural renaissance. Beidas was the pioneer of the modern Levantine short-story and novel. He was also a prolific translator—as early as 1898, he had translated some of the works of Tolstoy and Pushkin into Arabic. In addition, he established a magazine, "al-Nafā'is al-'asriyyah" (النفائس العصرية, The Modern Treasures), which acquired a good name in literary circles both in the Ottoman vilayet of Syria (broadly corresponding to today's Israel, Palestine, Jordan, Syria, and Lebanon) and the Palestinian Diaspora. Beidas is also known as Raʾid al-qissa al-filastiniyya (the pioneer of Palestinian short-story). He and his wife, Adele, had 4 sons and 4 daughters.

== Education and career ==
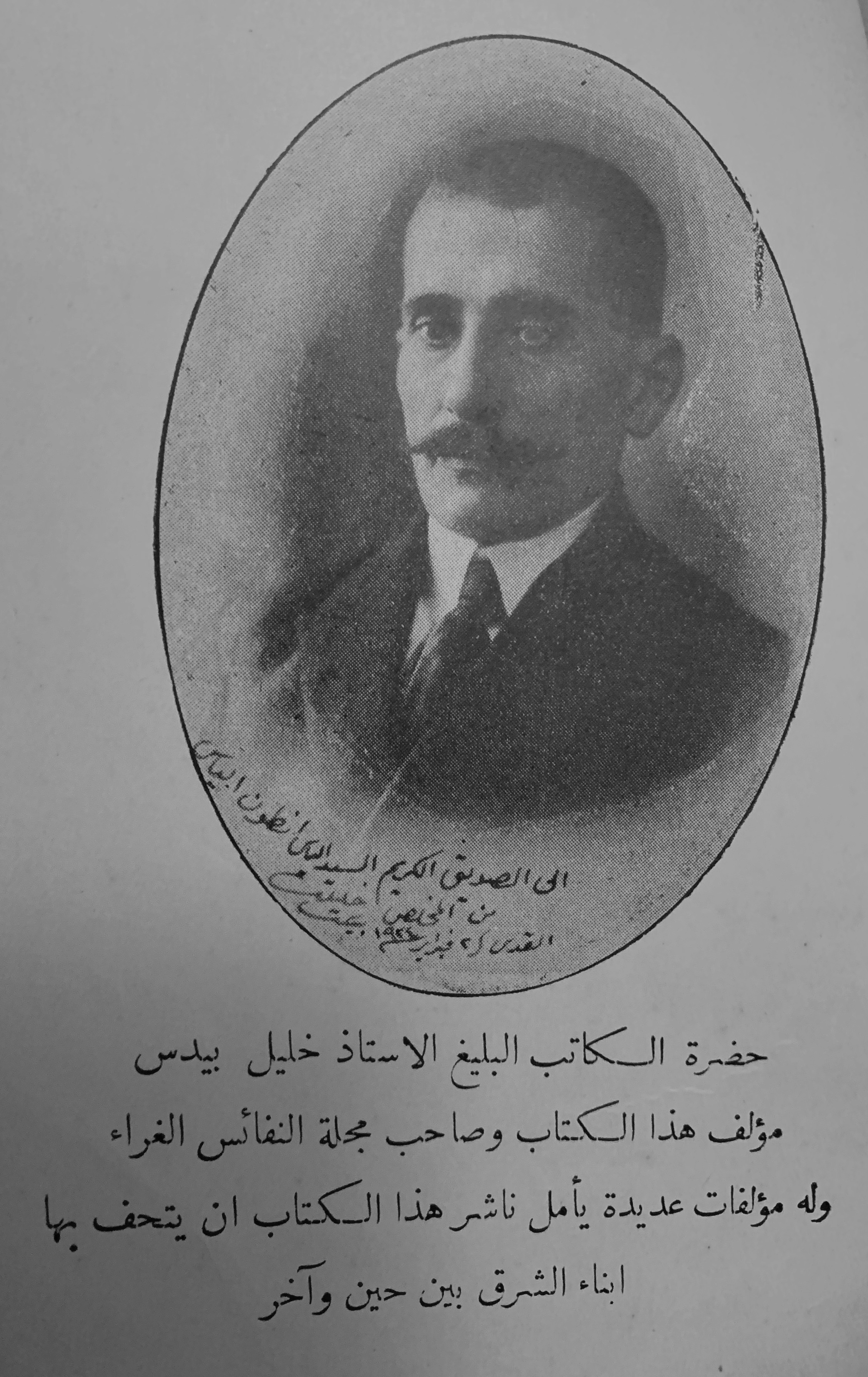
Khalil Beidas from 1924 book of short stories

Beidas was born in Nazareth, Ottoman Palestine, vilayet of Syria in 1874 and studied at the Russian Orthodox al-Muskubīya (presently, according to Edward Said, a detention and interrogation centre predominantly for Palestinians) and the Russian Teachers' Training Centre in Nazareth (now an Israeli police station), which had been founded in that town in 1886. There were no tuition fees for Palestinian students, and though teaching was in Arabic, high importance was placed on studying Russian. In his recollections, Beidas stated that:'In those days, Russian schools in Palestine were, without doubt, the best.' He graduated in 1892. Beidas' education was on a basis of classical Arab culture, and, though a Christian, Beidas achieved renown as a hafiz. In his early twenties, Beidas was appointed headmaster of Russian missionary schools in many parts of Syria and Palestine. Later, he became the senior Arabic teacher at Anglican-run St. George's School in Jerusalem.

Beidas travelled in Russia after his graduation in 1892 as a ward of the Russian Orthodox Church, and during his sojourn there came under the influence of ideas of Nikolai Berdyaev, of late 19th century Russian cultural nationalists like Dostoevsky and by writers like Maxim Gorky and Leo Tolstoy. On returning to Palestine, Beidas became a prolific translator, and a dominant figure in introducing the major writers of Russian literature to the Arabic-speaking world. It was also through their Russian translations that he turned out many versions of major English, French, German and Italian writers. These innovative translations had a wide impact, not only in Palestine where he was a pioneer in the development of a modern literature, but more broadly throughout the Arab world, influencing authors as various as the Iraqi Ma'rūf al Rusāfī (1875–1945), the Lebanese Halīm Dammūs (1888–1957) and Wadī' al-Bustānī (1888–1945), Syrian authors like Qistākī al-Himsī (1858–1931). His technique in translation was distinctive—he translated freely, a creative 'arabization' that embroidered or curtailed the origins until he achieved what he considered to be the basic aim of the novel, that which is derived from everyday life and human nature.

According to Edward Said Later, Beidas's novels played an important role in the 'construction of a Palestinian national identity, particularly with regard to the influx of Zionist settlers. His first literary venture into this genre was al-Warith (The Inheritor/The heir) in 1920. The book dealt with a subject, the Palestine Partition Plan and the establishment of the state of Israel, which appeared only occasionally down to 1948, but whose significance for writers who survived the debacle only emerged after that date, retrospectively. In this work, in which a Jew gets rich via usury and decent people are exploited. It is one of the two Palestinian novels of note written before the 1948 Palestinian expulsion and flight, the other being A Chicken's Memoirs (1943) by Ishaq Musa al-Husaini. He played an important role also in the 1930s in the development of Palestinian theatre, which thrived down to 1948.

Given his strong connections with the Russian Orthodox Church, Beidas became a leading member of Palestine's Orthodox church, representing the Orthodox Christians of Northern Palestine at the Combined Council of Arab Orthodox and Greek Clergy which was charged to administer Orthodox affairs in Jerusalem.

On the occasion of the Nebi Musa riots of 1920, which arose in protest at the incipient implementation by the British Mandatory authorities of the Balfour Declaration's opening of Zionist immigration into Palestine, Beidas was one of the key speakers, credited with giving a 'soul-stirring speech. Some speakers were thought to be incendiary: the crowd responded by chanting 'we will drink the blood of the Jews'( Nashrab dam al-yahud.) Beidas's own words concluding with the remark,'My voice is weakening with emotion, but my national heart will never weaken'. He, together with several others, was rounded up and detained. He was released in 1921, according to one account in the expectation that lenience would secure his support and mitigate his opposition. Overtures came from the French Mandatory authorities in Lebanon to "grease his palm" and get him to write political propaganda against the British, an offer he refused on the grounds that he had no intention of being either a lackey of the British or a sycophant of the French. Soon after, in 1922, he published his history of the city of Jerusalem, Ta'rikh al-Quds (History of Jerusalem), (1922) A short story collection Masarih al-Adh'han (Pastures of the Mind) came out in 1924 and displays his use of fiction to moralise and edify the reader.

Beidas was interested in European culture, especially with its humanitarian and social aspects and, prompted by the contemporary Russian cultural resurgence to which he had been exposed, called for a comprehensive cultural revival in the Arab world. His own cultural works were multi-faceted: literary criticism, educational textbooks, translation of major foreign works of fiction, works on linguistics, political speeches and articles and works of Arab, Greek and European history.

Beidas' was a main proponent of the Palestinian national movement, through his journal Al-Nāfa'is as well as through a number of public speeches and articles in major Arabic (Egyptian) newspapers such as Al-Ahram and Al-Muqattam. Beidas tried to raise awareness of the threatening presence of the Zionist immigrants, and urged the Ottoman authorities to treat the inhabitants of the Palestinian Sanjaks fairly.

Beidas established a unique library of old manuscripts, valuable books as well as a Stradivarius violin, all of which were lost, together with several of his manuscript compositions, when he fled to Beirut after the establishment of the State of Israel in 1948. His library is thought to reside within the Jewish National Library at the Hebrew University of Jerusalem.

== Al-Nafa'is ==
Beidas' weekly periodical, al-Nafā'is al-'asriyyah (النفائس العصرية, The Modern Treasures), was founded in 1908 in Haifa, around the time of the Young Turk Revolution of July 1908. (Note: Greenberg – against most sources – places it after the YTR in January 1909 (Greenberg 2012, p. 15).) He initially described its as "a magazine for jests and fun-making pieces" (majallat latā'if wa fukāhãt). It started by running short stories but also serializations of the Russian novels he was then translating. In one of his anonymous pieces for it, Beidas called upon the fathers of his society to prepare their children towards the 'age of freedom' (al-hurriyya), one where the free man was somebody who could make his own law (shar'ia) and guide himself (qiyadat nafsibi). Soon afterwards, in 1911, production was relocated to Jerusalem, where it was published on the printing presses of the Syrian Orphanage (Dar al-Aytam) in Jerusalem, founded by Johann Ludwig Schneller (1820–1896). several months after the Young Turk Revolution of July 1908. It was to become one of the most popular periodicals amongst Arabs living both within the Levant and in the Palestinian Diaspora.

Beidas was in full technical control of the journal, editing most of the contents himself. It became a mouthpiece for all major active writers in the region of Syria and the Palestinian Diaspora and was distributed widely, as far a field as Brazil and Australia. An-Nafa'is became a distinguished institution, benefiting from the general cultural awakening in the region and the increased focus on literary and scientific matters.

In the preface to the first issue of An-Nafa'is, Beidas explained that he considered novels to be one of the great pillars of civilisation in the enlightenment of the mind and his aim was to draw readers' attention to the significance of narrative art from the intellectual, social and moral point of view.

== Selected works ==
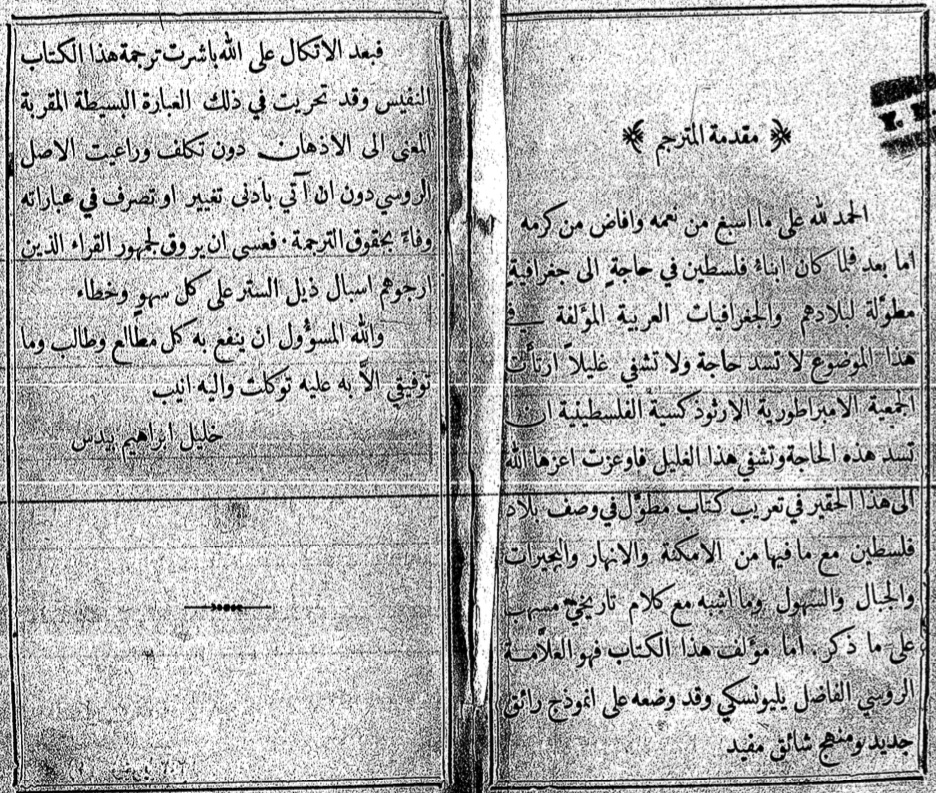
Khalil Beidas's 1898 use of the word "Palestinians" in the preface to his translation of Akim Olesnitsky's A Description of the Holy Land

1898–99

- Ibnat al Qubtan (ابنة القبطان, Pushkin's The Captain's Daughter), Beirut, 1898
- Al-Tabib al-Hathiq (الطبيب الحاذق, The Skilled Physician), Beirut, 1898
- Al-Quzaqi al-Walhan (The Distracted Caucasian), Beirut, 1899
- History of Ancient Russia, Beirut, 1899
- Several educational books
- Several textbooks on arithmetic

1908–21

- Shaqa' al-Muluk (شقاء الملوك: رواية ادبية غرامية اجتماعية, The Misery of Kings), 1908
- Ahwal al-Istibdad (أهوال الاستبداد, Aleksey Nikolayevich Tolstoy's The Terrors of Totalitarianism), 1909
- Henry Al-Thamin (Henry VIII), Jerusalem, 1913
- Al-Hasna' Al-Muntakira (The Disguised Beauty), Jerusalem, 1919
- Al-Arch wa Al-Heb, 1919
- Al-Warath, 1919
- Al-Tayaran (The History of Flight), Cairo, 1912
- Rihla ila Sina (Trip to Sinai), Beirut, 1912
- Muluk al-Rus (The Tsars of Russia), Jerusalem, 1913
- Darajat Al-Hisab (Grades of Arithmetic), Volumes I and II, Jerusalem 1914
- Al-Qira'a (Grades of Reading), Volumes I–VII, Jerusalem, 1913–21
- Umam Al-Balkan (The Balkan States), Jerusalem, 1914

Collections of short stories

- Ifaaq Al-Fakar (آفاق الفكر), c.1924
- Masarih Al-Adhhan (Masareeh Al-Adhan) (مسارح الاذهان: مجموعة ادبية فنية روائية فى حقيقة الحياة), c.1924

== See also ==
- Palestinian Christians

== Sources ==
- Boustani, Sobhi (2013). "Jewish Figures in Modern Arabic Literature". In Meddeb, Abdelwahab; Stora, Benjamin (eds.). A History of Jewish-Muslim Relations: From the Origins to the Present Day. Princeton University Press. pp. 566–572. ISBN 9781400849130.
- Büssow, Johann (2011). "Children of the Revolution: Youth in Palestinian Public Life,1908–1914.". In Ben-Bassat, Yuval; Ginio, Eyal (eds.). Late Ottoman Palestine: The Period of Young Turk Rule. I.B.-Tauris. pp. 55–79. ISBN 9780857719942.
- Der Matossian, Bedross (2011). "Administering the Non-Muslims and 'The Question of Jerusalem' after the Young Turk Revolution". In Ben Bassat, Yuval; Ginio, Eyal (eds.). Late Ottoman Palestine: The Period of Young Turk Rule. I.B.Tauris. pp. 211–239. ISBN 978-184885631-8.
- Doumani, Beshara B (1999). "'Rediscovering Ottoman Palestine: writing Palestinians into history". In Pappé, Ilan (ed.). The Israel/Palestine Question;Rewriting Histories. Vol. 3. Otto Harrassowitz Verlag. pp. 11–39. ISBN 9780415169479.
- Foster, Zachary (29 February 2016). "Who Was The First Palestinian in Modern History". The Palestine Square. Institute for Palestine Studies. Archived from the original on 29 February 2016.
- Greenberg, Ela (2012). Preparing the Mothers of Tomorrow: Education and Islam in Mandate Palestine. University of Texas Press. ISBN 978-029274998-6.
- Hamdal, Nathalie (2015). "Introduction". In Khalidi, Ismail; Wallace, Naomi (eds.). Inside/Outside: Six Plays from Palestine and the Diaspora. The ater Communications Group, New York. pp. xv–xxxi. ISBN 9781559367981.
- Imangulieva, Aida (2009). Gibran, Rihani & Naimy: East–West Interactions in Early twentieth century Arab literature. Inner Farne Press. ISBN 978-190593727-1.
- Jawharriyeh, Walid (2014). Tamari, Salim; Nassar, Issam (eds.). The Storyteller of Jerusalem: The Life and Times of Wasif Jawharriyeh 1904–1948. Olive Branch Press. ISBN 978-162371039-2.
- Khalidi, Rashid (2010). Palestinian Identity: The Construction of Modern National Consciousness. Columbia University Press. ISBN 978-023115075-0.
- Mardelli, Bassil A. (2010). Middle East Perspectives: Personal Recollections (1947 – 1967). iUniverse. ISBN 978-145021118-5.
- Mattar, Philip (2005). Encyclopedia of the Palestinians (2nd ed.). Facts on File. ISBN 978-081606986-6.
- Mazza, Roberto (2015). "Transforming the Holy City: From Communal Clashes to Urban Violence, the Nebi Musa Riots in 1920". In Freitag, Ulrike; Fuccaro, Nelida; Ghrawi, Claudia; et al. (eds.). Urban Violence in the Middle East: Changing Cityscapes in the Transition from Empire to Nation State. Berghahn Books. pp. 179–195. ISBN 9781782385844.
- Moore-Gilbert, Bart (2009). Postcolonial Life-Writing: Culture, Politics, and Self-Representation. Routledge. ISBN 978-113410692-9.
- Moosa, Matti (1997). The Origins of Modern Arabic Fiction. Lynne Rienner Publishers. ISBN 978-089410684-2.
- Peled, Matityahu (1988). Aspects of modern Arabic literature. Peeters. ISBN 978-113683621-3.
- Reynolds, Dwight F. (2015). The Cambridge Companion to Modern Arab Culture. Cambridge University Press. ISBN 978-131629811-4.
- Said, Edward (2013). Out of Place: A Memoir. Granta Books. ISBN 978-184708224-4.
- Taha, Ibrahim (2010). "Khalil Baydas". In Allen, Roger M. A.; Lowry, Joseph Edmund; Stewart, Devin J. (eds.). Essays in Arabic Literary Biography: 1850–1950. Vol. 3. Otto Harrassowitz Verlag. pp. 71–79. ISBN 9783447061414.
