= Cornelius Van Alen Van Dyck =

American missionary physician and teacher (1818–1895)

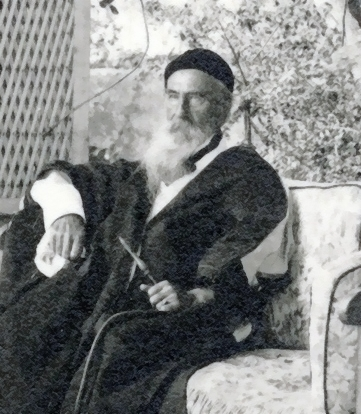
- Born: Cornelius Van Alen Van Dyck; August 13, 1818; Kinderhook, New York
- Died: November 13, 1895 (aged 77); Beirut, Ottoman Syria
- Occupations: Physician, academic, translator, pathologist

Cornelius Van Alen Van Dyck, M.D. (August 13, 1818 – November 13, 1895) was an American missionary physician, teacher and translator of the Protestant Bible into Arabic.

== Life ==
Cornelius Van Alan Van Dyck was born at Kinderhook, New York and educated at Jefferson Medical College, Philadelphia, from which he graduated as M.D. in 1839.

In 1840, he was sent to Lebanon by the American Board of Commissioners for Foreign Missions as a medical missionary for the Dutch Reformed Church, and he was stationed at Beirut, Abeih, Sidon, and Mount Tabor. He studied Arabic in Beirut under Butrus al-Bustani and Nasif al-Yaziji, both of whom later became famous Arab writers, and Yusuf al-Asir, with whom he would later collaborate in translating the Bible into Arabic. He married Julia Abbott, daughter of the former British consul-general in Beirut, in December 1842.

In June 1843, they moved to Abeih, where, with W. M. Thomson, he organized a secondary school for training evangelical ministers. Noting the scarcity of suitable teaching materials in Arabic, he proceeded to write Arabic textbooks on geography, navigation, natural history, and mathematics, which were long used in Syrian schools. He also studied theology and was ordained a minister by his fellow missionaries in 1846, shortly before the inauguration of the Abeih Seminary.

In 1849, he was abruptly transferred from Abeih to Sidon, where he was expected to open a new mission station, preach, and practice medicine. Upon returning to Beirut in 1857, he began to work on the Arabic Bible. After completing the translation in 1865, he went to New York to supervise its printing, also teaching Hebrew for two years at Union Theological Seminary and studying ophthalmology.

On returning to Beirut, Van Dyck became a professor of pathology and internal medicine in the medical school of the newly founded Syrian Protestant College, which later became the American University of Beirut. He also taught astronomy in its literary section, directed its observatory and meteorological station as well as the mission press, and edited its weekly journal al-Nashran. He wrote Arabic textbooks on chemistry, internal medicine, physical diagnosis, and astronomy, publishing some of them at his own expense, and he helped Yaqūb Ṣarrūf and Fāris Nimr to establish the popular science magazine Al-Muqtaṭaf.

He translated al-Razi's ninth-century treatise on smallpox and measles, adding a critical commentary. Often called al-Hakim during his lifetime, Van Dyck had a large medical practice in addition to his academic duties.

== Lewis affair ==
He resigned from the Syrian Protestant College after the 1882 commencement address by Professor Edwin Lewis was censored by the college board for mildly favoring Charles Darwin's theory of evolution by natural selection, considered heretical by most Protestants. He stayed in Beirut, practicing at the Hospital of St. George as its chief physician. He published more books in Arabic, including a translation of Lew Wallace's Ben Hur.

He died in Beirut in 1895.

== Family ==
Cornelius was married to Julia Abbot and they had six children.

State Senator Henry H. Van Dyck (1809–1888) was his brother.
