= Yaqub Sarruf =

Ottoman Lebanese writer and publisher

- يعقوب صروف
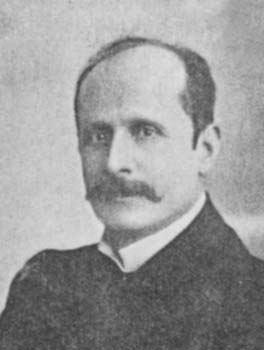
- Born: 1852
- Died: 1927 (aged 74–75)
- Citizenship: Ottoman Empire (1852–1918); Greater Lebanon (1920–1927)
- Education: American University of Beirut – Bachelor of Science, 1870); New York University – Doctor of Philosophy, 1890
- Occupation(s): Writer, journalist, teacher, poet, and scientist
- Known for: Al-Muqtataf

Yaqub Sarruf (Arabic: يعقوب صروف, 1852–1927) was a pioneering Lebanese writer, publisher, and translator. Sarruf was born in Al-Hadath, Lebanon. His father sent him to the American School in Abey, then to the Syrian Protestant College where he obtained a Bachelor of Science degree in 1870. He later obtained a PhD from Cambridge. After his graduation he assumed the presidency of the American Schools in Sidon and Tripoli. In 1876, he founded the monthly popular science magazine Al-Muqtataf with Faris Nimr in Beirut. He moved to Cairo in late 1884 where he continued publishing the magazine until his death in 1927. Sarruf and Nimr were nominated for two of SPC's first honorary degrees in 1890, but they declined to attend the ceremony.

== See also ==
- Cornelius Van Alen Van Dyck
