= Mass media in Egypt =

Mass media in Egypt includes a variety of online, television, radio, print, and magazines. It is highly influential in the Arab World, attributed to its large audience and its historical TV and film industry supplies to the Arab-speaking world.

== Overview ==
A period of ease on media marked the last years of Hosni Mubarak's rule, but since the 2011 revolution and 2013 coup d'état, Reporters Without Borders said "successive governments have tried to control the media and have not hesitated to impose measures restricting journalists' freedom," in 2016, and "the situation of media freedom in Egypt is extremely worrying" in 2017. While state media is "almost always loyal to President al-Sisi," and most pro-Islamist media have been closed, or now broadcast from abroad, journalists and human rights defenders are denied access to parts of the Sinai region and are obliged to report only the official version of terrorist attacks under the terrorism law that was adopted in August 2015.

Following the 2011 revolution, acquisitions of media outlets and private newspapers by businessmen linked to the government started surfacing, initially with close ties to the newly in-power Muslim Brotherhood, businessmen then shifted in 2013 with the deposition of former President Mohamed Morsi to Gen. Abdel Fattah al-Sisi's support and regime. In 2016 the takeover by businessmen linked to the government and intelligence services escalated rapidly; and the regime's domination of the media is affecting even pro-government media. In addition to those acquisitions, the government tapped into the market with a major new TV network named "DMC" with a range of news, sports, and entertainment channels changing the landscape beyond the "official" outlets that lost their credibility, DMC also imposed a de facto monopoly over filming where other privately owned TV channels are denied access.

Online, Egypt banned at least 62 websites in a crackdown in June 2017, including Daily Sabah, Medium, Al Jazeera, The Huffington Post, and Mada Masr along with opposition websites, like El-Badil, for containing material that "support terrorism and extremism as well as publish lies", that blockade was followed by a growing list of censorship circumvention and VPN providing websites in addition to the blockade of OpenVPN protocol on a national scale. The crackdown was condemned by the Association for Freedom of Thought and Expression (AFTE), Mada Masr, and by the Index on Censorship. The ATFE stated that "the blocking of websites violates the Egyptian Constitution". The country saw a period of increasing freedom from governmental control during the last years of ousted president Hosni Mubarak. Although Freedom of the media is guaranteed in the constitution, and the government was increasingly respecting this, however many laws still remain that restrict this right. Back in 2005, and after the Egyptian presidential election, Ahmed Selim, office director for Information Minister Anas al-Fiqi, declared the era of "free, transparent and independent Egyptian media".

== History of the printing press ==
The printing press was first introduced to Egypt by Napoleon Bonaparte during his French Campaign in Egypt and Syria. He brought with his expedition a French, Arabic, and Greek printing press, which were far superior in speed, efficiency and quality than the nearest presses used in Istanbul. In the Middle East, Africa, India, and even much of Eastern Europe and Russia, printing was a minor, specialized activity until at least the 18th century. From about 1720, the Mutaferrika Press in Istanbul produced substantial amounts of printing, of which some Egyptian clerics were aware at the time. Juan Cole reports that "Bonaparte was a master of what we would now call spin, and his genius for it is demonstrated by reports in Arabic sources that several of his more outlandish allegations were actually taken seriously in the Egyptian countryside."

== The press ==
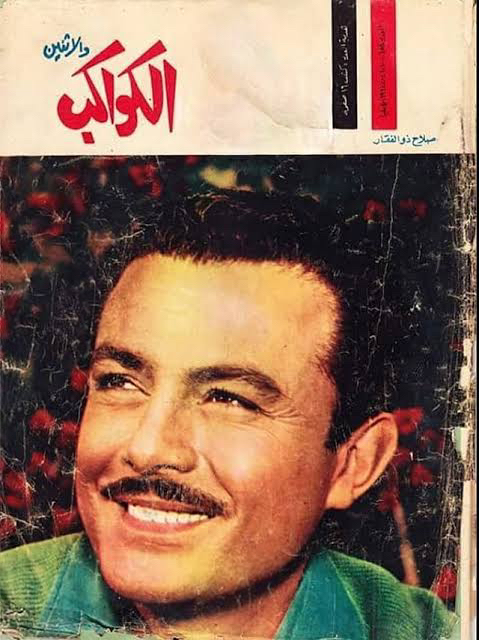
Al Kawakib Egyptian magazine cover featuring Egyptian movie star Salah Zulfikar, March 1961

The written press is very diverse in Egypt, with over 600 newspapers, journals, and magazines. However these are owned mostly or in some way by the government, the opposition or other political parties. Several journalists from private newspapers have been arrested and jailed for breaching laws that prohibit criticism of the President, state institutions and foreign leaders, or "putting out false news harming the reputation and interests of the country". However, unlike many of Egypt's regional counterparts, criticism of the government in general does take place, after amendments to existing press laws in 2006 which however still criminalise libel.

In 2009 an Egyptian court revoked the publishing license for Ibdaa ("creativity"), a small-circulation literary magazine, for publishing a "blasphemous" poem by Hilmi Salem called "On the balcony of Leila Murad" in which God is likened to an Egyptian peasant who farms and milks cows. It came to the attention of authorities at Al-Azhar University, described as "the government’s highest authority on religion", who then petitioned the courts, who ruled that "Freedom of the press ... should be used responsibly and not touch on the basic foundations of Egyptian society, and family, religion and morals". Over the past two decades, Al-Azhar University censored more than 196 texts.

In the late 1800s/early 1900s Egypt had journals in both Arabic and French. In much of the 1800s Alexandria served as the centre of Egyptian journalism. Circa the mid-to-late 1800s many famous literary journals were established in Alexandria, but moved to Cairo by the 1890s. By the late 1800s the makeup of Alexandria-based publications increasingly focused on culture while publications focused on political matters moved to Cairo. During that decade the city had twelve newspapers, and there were three new general culture journals that decade. By the 1890s the number of newspapers had increased to 39, and 19 new general cultural journals appeared that decade. In 1899 Al-Ahram moved to Cairo, and by circa 1901 publications in Cairo made up 65% of the total while ones based in Alexandria had declined to 28%.

=== Women's Press ===
The period before the creation of Egyptian political parties saw the creation of many women's periodicals and press, from the year 1892, with the creation of the first women's journal al-Fatah by Hind Nawfal, originally published in Alexandria, until through the first world war, an average of 1 new journal was being created each year. For Nawal, this was an opportunity to write for and about women and to defend their right's, express her views and discuss their duties. Editions of the journal were published continually for two years, after which she stopped publications.

Examples of other significant periodicals include Muslim women's journal Tarqiyat al-Mar'a which was first published in 1908, which fought for women's rights which had already been granted by Islam and argued against the mixing of genders and for veiling. In the same year, Malaka Sa-d first published al-jins al-lateef, a Coptic journal dedicated to the issues Coptic women faced, it published a diverse set of female editors.

Although originally influenced by western European and Turkish women's press, these journals evolved throughout the years. Women did not feature on the cover until the 1920s, with drawings previously being preferred due to conventions on veiling. During this time, men started writing women's periodicals too as it became an accepted literary genre, these often came in a tabloid form.

== Television ==
There are two state broadcasters and an increasing number of private broadcasters. Figures from the CIA World Factbook state more than 98 television channels in 1995, and 57 AM and 14 FM radio channels in 1999. The Ministry of Information controls content in the state-owned broadcast media. Egypt was the first Arab nation to have its own satellite, Nilesat 101, which allows the Egyptian TV and film industry to supply much of the Arab-speaking world with shows from its Media Production City. The previously tight controls on state TV and radio gave way to even and fair coverage of all political parties involved in the Egyptian presidential election of 2005, a first for Egyptian media. However, in 2006 several journalists working for the Cairo branch of the Qatar-based Al-Jazeera were detained for investigating subjects such as police brutality and "harming the country's reputation".

== Radio ==
Egyptian radio broadcasting (as in both FM and AM bands) began to serve in Egypt in the 1920s as locally owned radios. They began airing radio as The Egyptian State Radio on the 31 May 1934 in an agreement with the Marconi Company. In 1947 the contract with the Marconi Company was canceled and radio broadcasting was nationalized by the Egyptian government.

By the early 1990s, Egypt had only four FM stations, but the number increased to six by the end of the decade. In 2000 stations moving from the AM band and the introduction of private stations raised the number to ten stations as of 2006.

=== As a political tool ===
Radio has also historically been utilized as a political tool in Egypt beginning under the rule of President Gamal Abdel Nasser.(10) Nasser became president of Egypt in 1954 and served until his death in 1970.(10) When Nasser came to power he realized that radio could be utilized as a powerful political tool for two reasons. First, the illiteracy rate in Egypt has been traditionally high.(11) Using radio to spread political ideas, therefore, allowed a greater number of the population to hear his political ideas. Many Egyptians, both literate and illiterate, also enjoyed listening to radio, so this provided an alternative means to propagate his ideologies other than print media.(11) Second, he had the power to expand the radio to all parts of Egypt allowing for the dissemination of his political messages throughout Egypt.(11)

The main program Nasser utilized to voice his politics was the Voice of the Arabs.(10) This program was started on July 4, 1953 and was directed by Ahmed Said.(10) Said was also the chief announcer of the program and had a close relationship with Nasser and his administration. Nasser's political goals for Egypt were seen as strongly revolutionary and adopted positions such as anti-colonialist, anti-imperialist, and anti-Zionist.(10) These positions were highly supported and strongly voiced on the Voice of the Arabs in the mid- to late 1950s.(10) This revolutionary propaganda influenced two significant events in Arab countries in the 1950s.

The first was when the Voice of the Arabs began a series of broadcasts in 1955 that called for Jordanian citizens to campaign against their countries involvement in Baghdad Pact and against their governments close involvement with Britain.(10) This resulted in the dismissal of General John Bagot Glubb, a veteran soldier and Arabist who had been in Jordan over 25 years, as a commander of Jordanian forces.(10) Although the broadcasts cannot be proven fully as the reason for his dismissal, it is strongly believed that the demonstrations that resulted from the broadcasts influenced the Jordanian presidents decision.(10)

The second was broadcasts from 1955 to 1958; which promoted revolution in Iraq.(10) At this time period Iraq had joined the Baghdad Pact, and Nasser saw this as Britain attempting to westernize the Arab world.(10) Due to this the Voice of the Arabs broadcasts were calling on for a revolution by the Iraqi citizens against the royal family and Prime Minister Nuri al-Said.(10) Broadcasts in 1957, in fact, called for the outright assassination of es-Said and the royal family.(10) In 1958, a military coup overthrew the Iraqi government and es-Said and King Faisal II of Iraq were killed.(10) The Egyptian broadcasts were not the sole cause of this, but Ahmed Said did receive a letter with a piece of es-Said's finger inside that thanked him for the support.(10)

After 1958, the role of radio as a powerful political tool declined.(10) By the 1960s radio had been around for many years in Egypt and the emergence of television created competition for the radio. Also, after 1970, radio programs such as the Voice of the Arabs reduced their broadcasting hours substantially. During this same period religious radio programs increased more than any other.(10)

== Internet ==
The government has actively encouraged internet usage, quadrupling over the last few years with around 17 million regular users in 2010, around 21 percent of the population. Internet penetration jumped in 2013 reaching 49.6% of Egypt's 90 million population. The internet is often used for political opposition, blogging, and lively debate amongst the public and by the media which can publish stories that are prohibited in the print media. The Egyptian government does not widely censor the internet, though the state-run Supreme Administrative Court allowed the Ministry of Information and Ministry of Communication to close down or block websites that are a "threat to national security". However, several people have been detained for insulting Islam, state institutions and President Hosni Mubarak during pro-democracy protests, as well as government officials in cases of abuse by the security services. On 10 April 2011, Egyptian blogger Maikel Nabil was sentenced to three years in prison by a military court on charges of insulting the armed forces and publishing false information after he published an article on 28 March titled "The people and the army were never one hand" in which he detailed cases of abuse by the military and criticized the Supreme Council of Armed Forces for undermining the revolution.

== Freedoms ==
Freedom of expression and belief tend to be suppressed by the Egyptian media sector to favor pro-government ideology since the coup in 2013. One of the former editors of a major publication Al-Ahram was detained in 2021 for false news of President Sisi to resign. In September 2026 the Egyptian authorities arrested and detained the entire news desk of independent investigative platform Matsadaash, accusing them of belonging to the outlawed Muslim Brotherhood.

== Regulation ==
Egypt's regulation laws encompass media and journalism publishing. Any form of press release to the public that goes against the Egyptian Constitution can be subject to punishment by these laws. This law was put in place to regulate the circulation of misinformation online. Legal action can be taken on those who share false facts. Egypt's Supreme Council for Media Regulations (SCMR) will be authorised to place people with more than 5,000 followers on social media or with a personal blog or website under supervision. More than 500 websites have already been blocked in Egypt prior to the new law in 2018. Websites must go through Egypt's “Supreme Council for the Administration of the Media” to acquire a license to publish a website.

Media regulation in Egypt has always been limited, but as in recent years, it has become even more limited. In 2018, a law was put in place to prevent the press and any media outlet from putting out content that violates the Egyptian Constitution, and/or contain any “violence, racism, hatred, or extremism.” If any content causes national security concerns or is broadcast as ‘false news’, the Egyptian Government will put a ban on those media outlets that produced that media. The law known as ‘The SCMR Law’, creates a media regulatory restriction plan that allows the government authorities to be able to block the content and those who want to be able to produce content, or be able to publish a website, have to obtain a license. In order to do that, those would need to go to Egypt's “Supreme Council for the Administration of the Media.”

== Former publications ==
The first Arabic-language newspaper in Egypt was al-Tanbih, published by the French, and headquartered in Alexandria, around the start of the 1800s. The first official Egyptian newspaper, in Arabic and based in Cairo, was Jurnāl al-Khidīw and appeared over ten years later. The bilingual Ottoman Turkish and Arabic paper Vekayi’-i mısriyye (al-Waqāʾiʿ al-miṣriyya), was first printed on 3 December 1828.

- Abū al-Nuwās (Alexandria) - Established in 1895 by Najib Gharghur
- al-ʻĀm al-Jadīd (Alexandria) - Established in 1895 by Najib Gharghur
- al-ʻAṣr al-Jadīd (Alexandria) - Established in 1880, its editors were 'Abd Allah al-Nadim and Salim ʻAbbas al-Shalafun, the latter being from Syria. It was one of two journals that Elisabeth Kendall, author of "Between Politics and Literature: Journals in Alexandria and Istanbul at the End of the Nineteenth Century," described as a replacement for al-Maḥrūsa and Mișr. Officially it was edited by Salim al-Naqqash, but he was not the real editor.
- al-Āmāl (Alexandria) - Established in 1899 by Najib Gharghur
- al-Babaghāʻ (Alexandria) - A satirical publication established by Najib Ghargur, it began in 1887 and had a run of five issues. Gharghur's influences came from Il Paparillo, a satirical publication published in Bologna, Italy.
- al-Burhān - It was established by Muhammad Farid and Hamza Fath Allah. It was based in Alexandria but moved to Cairo in 1881.
- al-Falāh - Established in 1886, it was based in Cairo and established by Salim al-Hamawi. He moved to Cairo to establish the paper even though he hitherto was active in Alexandria.
- Al-Fatat (Alexandria)
- al-Ḥaqīqa - (Alexandria) Co-founded by Najib Ghargur and Faraj Mizrahi in 1888, and with writers originating from Egypt and Syria described as "famous" by Kendall, it covered literary affairs and other topics; Kendall stated that the topics covered were "broad". Jurj Marza, from Lebanon, acquired the publication from Gharghur in 1889, and the publication folded later.
- al-Ibtisam (Alexandria), established in 1894, it focused on culture, was a general journal, and was co-founded by Rufa'il Mishawa and Najib Gharghur
- al-Iskarandiyya (Alexandria), established in 1878 by Salim al-Hamawi
- al-Ittiḥad al-Miṣrī (Alexandria), established by Rufa'il Mashaqa in 1881, focused on culture. Najib Gharghur began editing it in 1889, and continued until about 1909
- al-Maḥrūsa - Established in 1880, it was originally based in Alexandria, but moved to Cairo in 1887, and was one of two journals that Kendall described as a replacement for al-Maḥrūsa and Mișr. While it was in Alexandria, Fadl Allah al-Khuri, a Syrian, was the editor. It closed in 1882 due to the 'Urabi Revolt.
- al-Manāra (Alexandria), established in 1888 by Salim al-Khuri Bishara, with Najib Ghargur as the editor. The publication hired an artist from Bologna, Italy to make illustrations. According to Kendall, it had influences from Italian culture.
- Ar-Rawi (Alexandria). Established in 1888 by Khalil Ziniyya. With writers including Najib Gharghur and Najib al-Haddad, the monthly publication included literature, humorous content, intellectual content, and later political content; the last category prompted its shutdown in 1890. Ziniyya had considered re-establishing it but Ibrahim al-Yaziji from Syria suggested to Ziniyya that it remain out of operation. According to Kendall, it was one of two publications that, despite not lasting for a long time, had "greater literary significance".
- al-Tankīt wa-l-Tabkīt a.k.a. al-Ṭāʼif - Established in 1881 by al-Nadim, it was a weekly publication originally called al-Tankīt wa-l-Tabkīt, but changing to its latter name around the ninth issue. It was originally based in Alexandria. Kendall cited the copious letters sent to al-Nadim asking him to keep publishing the newspaper, after al-Nadim announced that he planned to end it, as proof of it having significant popularity. al-Nadim used vernacular Egyptian Arabic to write episodes and sketches in the publication and initially employed simple language as a way of spreading ideas to ordinary citizens, although the newspaper initially switched to classical Arabic. Around the 'Urabi Revolt in 1882 the publication headquarters shifted to Cairo, and Kendall wrote that it "became the official organ" of the revolt.
- al-Surūr (Alexandria) - Established by Niqula ʻAbd al-Masih in 1892 and running until about 1902, it focused on culture. Jurj Marza from Lebanon and Antun Nawfal from Syria edited it. Kendall credited the relative longevity to its "innocuous and eclectic" articles.
- al-Tijāra (Alexandria) - Established in 1879. In Kendall's words, Jurji Zaydan, the founder of al-Hilāl, described it as one of two "pillars in the evolution of Egyptian journalism". Kendall described it as one of two newspapers that, citing Zaydan, "stirred up Alexandrian intellectuals".
- Al Ustadh - Established by al-Nadim, it was published from 1892 to 1893 and was based in Cairo. The "episodes" published by al-Nadim in his previous publications also turned up in this one, and Kendall stated that there they retained their "popularity".
- Anis al-Jalis (Alexandria) - Established by Alexandra de Avirieno in 1898, it focused on women and had poet brothers Najib and Amin al-Haddad writing for it.
- Bulletin de l'Institut égyptien
- Ḥadīqat al-Adab (Alexandria) was established in 1888, by Najib Ghargur, who did not obtain an official license to create the work. It included versions of European fiction repurposed for an Arabic-speaking audience as well as some of Gharghur's original works. Kendall stated that it was popular and that it was the "most specialized literary journal" of all time, up to 2002, in Egypt. The lack of the license meant the Egyptian authorities closed the publication. Kendall stated that she was unsure of the time the journal closed but she guessed it was 1889. According to Kendall, it was one of two publications that, despite not lasting for a long time, had "greater literary significance".
- Il progresso, an Italian newspaper established in the city of Alexandria in 1858 and 1859.
- Isis. Revue française d'Égypte
- L'Echo des Pyramides - (Alexandria) Published around 1827, centred on education
- L'Égyptienne, a magazine that was started by Hoda Sharawy, beginning in 1925 and ending in 1940.
- L'Égypte contemporaine
- La Décade égyptienne
- La Semaine égyptienne Organe du Touring club
- Le Courier de l'Égypte (spelled with one or two rs)
- Le Phare du Bosphore - Originally in Turkey but later moving to Egypt, it was established in 1870 and edited by Kiriakopoulos. It ended in 1890.
- Le Phœnix : revue de la renaissance orientale
- Lisān al-ʻArab - Established in 1894 by poet brothers Najib and Amin al-Haddad, it included their works and anti-Sultan of the Ottoman Empire Abdul Hamid II content. Kendall stated that the writing was not as strong as that of 'Abd Allah al-Nadim. It ended in 1899 with Najib's death.
- Miscellanea Ægyptica (Alexandria) - Established in 1843, published by the Association littéraire d'Egypte, the first cultural-centred publication in Egypt
- Mișr - Established in 1877, its editors were Adib Ishaq and Salim al-Naqqash, from Syria. Initially the headquarters were in Cairo; in 1879 they were transferred to Alexandria, but went back to Cairo in 1881. In Kendall's words, Zaydan described it as one of two "pillars in the evolution of Egyptian journalism". Kendall described it as one of two newspapers that, citing Zaydan, "stirred up Alexandrian intellectuals".
- Mișr al-Fatā (content in Arabic and French), established in 1879 by the Young Egypt Society in Alexandria
- Revue d'Égypte

=== Women's Publications ===
- Al-Fatat, the first feminist publication, first published in 1982 by Hind Nawfal
- Anis al-Jalis, published from1898 to 1907, founded by Alexandra Avierino
- Artemis, first women's literary magazine, published by Marie Beylerian from January 1902 to December 1903
- Fatat al-Sharq, by Labiba Hasham, founded 1906
- al-jins al-lateef, by Malaka Sa-d, 1908-1925
- Tarqiyat al-Mar’a, Muslim journal from 1908
- La Femme Nouvelle, first published in 1944 by Doria Shafik
- Bint Al-Nil, published from 1945-1957 by Doria Shafik

== See also ==
- Ministry of Information
- List of newspapers in Egypt
- List of magazines in Egypt
- Middle East News Agency
- Cinema of Egypt
- Egyptian literature
- Cairo Foreign Press Association
