= History of women's magazines =

Women magazines began to emerge in the late 17th century, reflecting the evolving social and normative practices for women. Eventually, women's magazines began offering female voices. The first emergence of women's magazines were from The Ladie's Mercury in England, and The Ladies Magazine in the US.

== Europe ==
In 1693 the first issue of the first women's magazine in Britain, The Ladies' Mercury, was published.

Published from 1934 to 1945, the NS-Frauen-Warte, the Nazi magazine for women, had the status of the only-party-approved magazine for women and served propaganda purposes, particularly supporting the role of housewife and mother as exemplary. Caitríona Clear has conducted research on Irish women's magazines.

== Asia and Africa ==
In 1857 the first women's magazine in Gujarati, Streebodh, was established by Parsi social activists.

In 1886 the first Malayalam women's magazine, Kerali Sugunabodhini, was published from Thiruvananthapuram, Kerala.

In 1892 the first women's magazine in Egypt, and indeed in all the Arab countries, Al-Fatat, was established by Hind Nawfal. Another women's periodical, Fatat al-Sharq (Arabic: "فتاة الشرق), was first published in 1906.

In 1901, The Indian Ladies' Magazine established by Kamala Satthianadhan became the first English-language Indian women's magazine created and edited by a woman in the subcontinent. In 1952 the first English language women's magazine in Ceylon was founded and published by Sita Jayawardana. Titled Ceylon Woman it had a tagline "The Premier women's magazine of Ceylon". It covered fashion, society events and short stories. The magazine helped launch a generation of designers and artists. The magazine also ran an annual fashion show and various other cultural activities to raise money for social causes. In 1992 the first women's magazine in English to be published from North East India, Eastern Panorama, was established.

Satree Sarn Magazine was Thailand's first women's magazine.

In 1919 Mabel Malherbe of South Africa founded the first Afrikaans women's magazine, which was called Die Boerevrou.

== America ==
In the period before the American Civil War, Godey's Lady's Book was a United States women's magazine that was the most widely circulated magazine. Its circulation rose from 70,000 in the 1840s to 150,000 in 1860.

In 1963 Betty Friedan's book The Feminine Mystique was published; it is widely credited with sparking the beginning of second-wave feminism in the United States. In Chapter 2 of the book Friedan stated that the editorial decisions concerning women's magazines at the time were being made mostly by men, who insisted on stories and articles that showed women as either happy housewives or unhappy careerists, thus creating the "feminine mystique"—the idea that women were naturally fulfilled by devoting their lives to being housewives and mothers. Friedan also stated that this was in contrast to the 1930s, when women's magazines often featured confident and independent heroines, many of whom were involved in careers. However, historian Joanne Meyerowitz argued (in "Beyond the Feminine Mystique: A Reassessment of Postwar Mass Culture, 1946–1958", Journal of American History 79, March 1993) that many of the contemporary magazines and articles of the period did not place women solely in the home, as Friedan stated, but in fact supported the notions of full- or part-time jobs for women seeking to follow a career path rather than being a housewife. These articles did however still emphasize the importance of maintaining the traditional image of femininity.
