= Women's literary salons and societies in the Arab world =

The tradition of women's literary circles in the Arab world dates back to the pre-Islamic period when the eminent literary figure, Al-Khansa, would stand in the 'Ukaz market in Mecca, reciting her poetry and airing her views on the scholarship of others. From this, a culture of literary criticism emerged among Arab women, and under the Umayyad dynasty, Sukaynah Bint Al-Husayn established the first literary salon in her home. The tradition was revived during the late nineteenth century, as a result of sweeping social, political and economic change within the Ottoman Empire and Europe's increasing political and cultural influence in the region. The initial pioneers of the Arab salon were women from wealthy families in the region of Syria and Egypt, who returned influenced by interaction with European women during their time spent studying abroad and frequenting Parisian salons, or studying in schools run by European or American missionaries. The salon evenings, run by women but attended by both men and women, provided a unique opportunity to have discussions about social, political and literary trends of the day. Though the tradition died out somewhat after the Second World War, it has left a lasting legacy on literary culture and women's issues throughout the Arab world.

== Background to the nineteenth-century literary societies ==
=== Women and education ===
The educational reforms of the nineteenth century, a period of sweeping social, economic and political transition, resulted from various undercurrents occurring at different levels within the realms of the Ottoman Empire from the Mashreq (Greater Syria) to the Maghreb (North Africa). These trends were largely attributable to the increased European presence in the region and their secular ideas of modernity.

At a societal level, the arrival of Christian missionaries supported by the European and American governments led to the creation of a formal system of education for girls, who had until this period received little or no education. Initially, this took the form of private institutions attracting wealthy and mostly Christian families. However, as these schools became more socially acceptable and affordable, the idea trickled down to the middle classes before finally reaching out to the poor. Thus, a new norm was becoming increasingly prevalent; the idea that girls should receive an education so as to afford them better marriage prospects, and more importantly, to provide them with adequate means in which to educate their children. At this point in time, the range of subjects offered to women was limited. However women seized these opportunities to learn, and showed admirable drive and determination. By the middle of the century, a sense of "...awareness and obligation for intellectual and social consciousness, especially the appreciation of women's plight, and the struggle for a voice in society became visible and public." A notable example of the contribution of Western missionaries to increasing educational opportunities for women was the work of Daniel and Abby Maria Bliss, an American couple who moved to Beirut in 1866 and subsequently set up the Syrian Protestant College (which later became the American University of Beirut). In 1905, a nursing programme that accepted applications from women was established, and in 1924, the Faculty of Arts and Sciences opened its doors to female students.

The rumblings of reform taking place within Ottoman society reached the Sultanate, and were eventually echoed at an institutional level. The Ottoman regime, in order to counteract the threat of political and religious influence from the Christian missionary schools and due to the realisation that the empire could not hope to survive without learning the modern natural sciences, began to implement its own reforms (tanzimat). According to the Arab historian, Eugene Rogan, the reforms introduced by the Sultanate had little effect on the subjects of the empire. However, by the 1850s and 1860s, the fruits of reform were visible in the daily life.

The third (and arguably the most important) current that led to the existence and improvement of women's education in the nineteenth and early twentieth century was due to European colonialism and its legacy. Napoleon's short-lived occupation of Egypt (1798–1801) was relatively unsuccessful by French standards. However, their revolutionary ideas and imports in the field of technology and education were to prove more durable in Egypt and the rest of North Africa. Under the leadership of Muhammad 'Ali, an admirer of French innovation and technology, interactions and exchanges between Egypt and France in the cultural, academic and scientific fields increased during his reign Indeed, it was not just male students who spent time abroad. Notable Arab hostesses or salonnières such as Mayy Ziyadah spent time in France, and the Egyptian feminist and occasional hostess of salon evenings, Huda Sha`arawi, used to grant scholarships to writers enabling them to study in Europe at her own expense. Ideas of educational reform and feminism were also occurring elsewhere in the Arab world, with the Syrian writer and scholar, Butrus al-Bustani (1819–1883) in Lebanon among the first to advocate women’s right to education in 1847. Two decades later in Tunisia, the reformist, Ahmed Kheireddine, stressed the importance of women's education in the running of households and raising children. This was a small, but crucial step in the emancipation of women in society. Later in Egypt, after the British had occupied Egypt of Egypt they also contributed to the reform of women's education. In his work entitled, Modern Egypt, Lord Cromer, who had served for almost thirty years as High Commissioner of Egypt, "...by confining the sphere of women's interest to a very limited horizon, cramps the intellect and withers the mental development of one-half of the population in Moslem countries.".

The European powers at that time aimed to establish an Arab elite class that supports their colonization policies in the Arab World. Therefore, education was made more accessible for those who were ready to detach from their cultural roots and embrace that of the colonial powers. This strategy was common in almost all the places that colonialism existed. Arab people still hold the perception that their leaders, whose families gained power from that time, are puppets to the western powers and that feeling may have stemmed from that period of time. Therefore, many Arabs believe that colonialism had a very bad effect on the political, cultural, social, and economic life of the vast majority of the Arab people.

By 1924, when the Faculty of Arts and Sciences at the American University of Beirut began accepting applications from women, the norm that "Knowledge rather than ignorance preserves women's dignity and morality" had been firmly established. In the face of confinement and exclusion from the formal education system, middle-class women overcame their exclusion and marginalisation from society, holding informal literary or study circles in their family homes. Moreover, women such as Mayy Ziyadah and Mary 'Ajami went on to pursue higher education in Europe, returning to set up well-known salons and contributing immeasurably to literary circles, print and production in the Arab world.

=== Women and the public sphere ===
At the turn of the nineteenth century, the idea of the harem continued to linger in many Arab societies. Women of the urban middle and upper classes were confined to the domestic sphere, and the vast majority remained unseen and unheard in public life. Necessity afforded female members of the lower and rural classes slightly more 'freedom', as they were needed to work the land in order to support their families. Women's issues began to emerge from the background - albeit slowly - in the late nineteenth and early twentieth century, with the likes of Qāsim Amin (1863–1908) calling the seclusion of women an 'injustice' and advocating partial empowerment of women. However, the majority of prominent feminist writers were men, and the presence of women activists in the public sphere was virtually non-existent. The salon and its male participants, many of whom were well-known intellectuals, provided them with a means in which to express their ideas and opinions in private, whilst accessing the male-dominant public sphere through their lively discussions and debates. In her thesis entitled 'Arab Women Going Public: Mayy Ziyadah and her Literary Salon in a Comparative Context', Boutheina Khaldi remarks that women of the salons overcame the obstacle of gender inequality "by bringing public men into their private salons and hence creating a public sphere from the very heart of the private one." The essays and letters produced by hostesses and participants of the salons on the topics discussed also had a considerable impact on society at the time, and in particular, the nurturing of the Arab Renaissance and women's emancipation. The publication of letters by is interpreted by Jürgen Habermas in his writing on the public sphere as bridging the gap between the private sphere in which women gathered, and the public sphere that they sought to shape and conquer.

=== Women and the Arab cultural renaissance ===
The Arab Renaissance (al-Nahda or Arabic: النهضة) was an endeavour to reach a compromise between contemporary practices similar to those in Europe and a shared Arab heritage, in the hope of shaping a new vision for an Arab society in transition. The relationship between women's literary salons and the Arab Awakening, as it was also referred to, is of paramount importance. Not only were meetings of literary figures an integral part of the Renaissance, but from the beginning of the Arab Renaissance in the nineteenth century, women came to realise the strong bonds between the literary-cultural, social and political, and that the literary movement was key to liberating the 'collective consciousness' from the traditional norms that had stunted their progress. Men also began to acknowledge the importance of women's emancipation to national liberation and development at this time, and there is no doubt that increased interactions between male and female intellectuals within literary circles made an invaluable contribution. One of the first men to write about the liberation of women was Qāsim Amin, an influential literary figure at the turn of the twentieth century, argued for the emancipation of women for the sake of the Arab Renaissance, as did al-Tahtawi. Both of these men frequented Mayy Ziyadah's salon in Cairo. Thus women's desire for emancipation and men's nationalist dreams became the keystone in the advancement of society.

In 1847, two great literary figures of the Arab cultural renaissance, Butrus Al-Bustani and Nasif Al-Yaziji, founded the first literary society, Jam'iyyat al-Adab wal-'Ulum (The Literary and Scientific Society). Its members were exclusively Syrian Christians and Europeans living and working in diplomatic and missionary circles. However, ten years later, al-Jam'iyya al-'Ilmiyya al-Suriyya (The Syrian Scientific Society) was established, and attracted Western-educated Muslims and Druze as well as Christians. In 1917, the Tunisian literary figure, Hassan Hosni Abdel-Wahab wrote about the urgent need for educated Muslim young women to take charge of the future and to 'awaken the nationalist spirit', as without this, 'life would turn to nihilism and its consequences'. Only a few years later in the 1920s, Manwia Al-Wartani and Habiba al-Minshari, became the leaders of a dynamic women's movement in Tunisia. Like these Tunisian pioneers, women of the upper and middle classes across the increasingly imagined Arab world began to reap the benefits of education, and many of them began to focus on writing and joined their male counterparts in contributing to the Arab Renaissance.

One woman of particular significance to the awareness of the Arab Renaissance amongst women was Princess Nāzīl Fadīl (c.1884-1914). Her salon seems to have had an effect on its male guests, who were usually prominent members of the nationalist cause.

The tradition of women's printing and press, an integral part of middle-class circles and the Renaissance, was also intertwined with the literary salon. Many hostesses produced letters and essays on issues discussed in salons, such as equality, women's rights and nationalism. In Palestine, for example, the press became a partisan for the women, who used it as a transmitter and a publicist for their activities. The Lebanese journalist, Hind Nawfal published the first monthly journal, al-Fatah in 1892 in Egypt, encouraging women to think of journalism as a respectable occupation. Other journals, many published by Lebanese women in Egypt, followed suit: Anis al-Jalis, al-'A'ilah, al-Mar'ah, al-Zahrah, Fatat al-Sharq, al-A'mal al-Yadawiyyah and al-'Arous (The Bride) which was published by Mary 'Ajami. It is worth noting that this publication did not focus solely on women's issues, but also those related to the Renaissance and nationalism. Whilst the environment in which these female literary figures were operating in was becoming more and more conducive to women's issues, the road to equality and liberation was by no means free from obstacles, and many women published articles under pseudonyms.

== The salon ==
=== Terminology ===
The French word, salon, which was first uttered in seventeenth century France comes from the Italian word sala; and was used to define a large reception hall or reception room in a private residence. Later, it was used when referring to social gatherings in nineteenth century France. The word found its way to Egypt with the Napoleonic expedition, and was one of many traces of the French-Egyptian encounter (1798-1801) and its legacy. Whilst the word salon itself was a European import, there were various words in Arabic that were used to describe various kinds of social gatherings in the Arab world. According to the academic and expert, Boutheina Khaldi, the terms nadwah or nadi or muntada "...were used traditionally to indicate the call on people to gather for a purpose." The word majlis, however, such as the majlis of the first hostess of an Arab salon - Sukaynah bint al-Husayn - has the specific meaning of assembly, a gathering that might have a more regular or permanent nature in terms of time and place." Khaldi goes on to say that the frequenters of the more modern Arab salons were obviously aware of these, and often used both the French and the Arab words to refer to the gatherings, implying the synthesis of both Arab and European influences in the salon culture.

=== The first salon ===
The history of the literary salon in the Arab world, of which little is known, dates back far longer than one would expect. Sukayna bint Husayn (735 / 743), began running her salon centuries during the Umayyad dynasty, well before the idea was first introduced to seventeenth century Europe. She was a highly regarded woman of great intelligence, and an expert in fashion and literature. She was the first woman to open her house to male and female guests, and organised evenings of music, literary criticism, and poetry.

=== European influences ===
Many of the Arab women who founded literary salons received at least part of their education in Europe or in European missionary schools, and were thus exposed to certain aspects of European culture, including the salon tradition. In this regard, the great impact of the colonial powers and the imposition of their culture and values on the region cannot be underestimated. However, that is by no means to say that the Arab women's literary salon was a passive imitation or export of European ideas. Rather, those men and women who travelled to Europe or who were well-read in European literature selected elements of the European tradition and fused them with the traditional Arab salons of old, which was typical of the Arab Renaissance. Moreover, in 1890, one of the French salonnières, Eugénie Le Brun, chose to hold a salon evening in Cairo in an effort to learn more about women's circles in Egypt, and to encourage the revival of the tradition. One of the salons said to have had an influence is Madame de Rambouillet's salon, which opened in 1618 and was held at the Hôtel de Rambouillet in Paris. It was the first and most famous salon in French history. Rambouillet made sure to distinguish her salon from an Academy, and emphasised entertainment as well as enlightenment. Like the later literary salons in the Arab world, the gatherings bore witness to the mingling of the literary elite, with male intellectuals and middle-class women. In a similar fashion to the salons in Cairo, topics such as religion, philosophy and history would be discussed, but it is noted that Rambouillet "...made sure the treatment of the subject was not heavy-handed." Mayy Ziyadah admired the French "salonnières", and made sure to write copious materials on the well-known French hostess, habituée and prominent woman of aristocratic Parisian society, Madame de Sévigné, who was herself influenced by her time spent at the Hôtel de Rambouillet. The great Egyptian nationalist and writer, Tāhā Husayn, who began attending Ziyadah's salon after she requested Ahmad Lutfi al-Sayyid bring him along on a Tuesday evening, comments on the fusion of Arab and European influences that created the salons of the late nineteenth and twentieth centuries: "Mayy revives by this salon a long-established Arab practice, just as she transfers to Egypt a long-established European practice, ancient and modern."

=== An evening spent in the salon ===
Unlike salon sessions in England, which sometimes took place during the day or over several days the salons in cities such as Cairo, Jerusalem and Aleppo were usually held in the evening or at night in the family homes of salonnières. One of the less well-known salons in Beirut, for example, was convened on three consecutive full-moon nights each month, where male and female guests stayed awake until dawn, enjoying the entertainment and lively literary discussions. It was the norm for salonnières to invite participants, and with notable exceptions such as Mayy Ziyadah who invited guests from different social standings in order to give young writers the opportunity to show off their talents to a discerning audience, the majority of salons were a space for male and female members of the educated middle class elite. Within the confines of the salon, the free-flow of conversation and reciprocity was encouraged, and a sense of equality was fostered. The salon evenings were also regarded as arbiters of music and literature, as well as places were social and political ideas were aired and discussed, and where guests could embrace new trends and fashions exported from Europe. There was something unique about these salon sessions, according to the historian Keith Watenpaugh, who lends a description of a salon evening:

"...soirées were unrelated men and women circulated with one another freely, and where Christians and Muslims, who shared a similar educational background, drank and smoked cigarettes—rather than sharing a nargileh (hookah pipe)—together while they sat in straight back chairs around high tables..."

The tone and topics of discussion were usually at the discretion of the salonnières or hostesses, who administered the conversation. Of course, every salon was slightly different, but most evenings offered a mix of serious and lighthearted conversation, with musical entertainment in some cases. As the conversation flowed, it was not uncommon for guests to colour their conversations with personal anecdotes or local gossip. Indeed, it was thought to be a necessary talent of a successful hostess to encourage such digressions. As these salons were conducted during the Arab Awakening, which advocated a synthesis of tradition and modernity, the use of fushā (classical Arabic) was emphasised. Unfortunately, specific topics of conversation in the literary salons have remained somewhat of a mystery over the years. However, in Yatanaqashun (They Discuss), a fictional portrayal of a salon session held in her house in which the subject of 'equality' was discussed at length, Mayy Ziyadah gives a good indication of the content, atmosphere and interactions between male and female participants in her salon.

Antun Sha`arawi also encapsulates the opulent evenings spent in a Syrian salon with his vivid description:

"Wearing either all black or all white dresses ordered from Paris, Marrash hosted the mixed evening get-togethers in which literary topics as varied as the Mu'allaqat, a cycle of seven pre-Islamic poems or the work of Rabelais were discussed. Chess and card games were played, and complicated poetry competitions took place; wine and 'araq flowed freely; participants sang, danced, and listened to records played on a phonograph."

=== Men who visited the salon ===
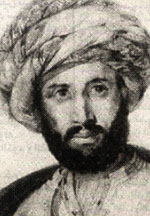
Rifā'ah Rāfi' al-Tahtāwi

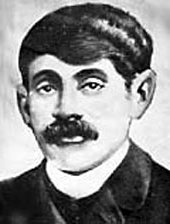
Qāsim Amin

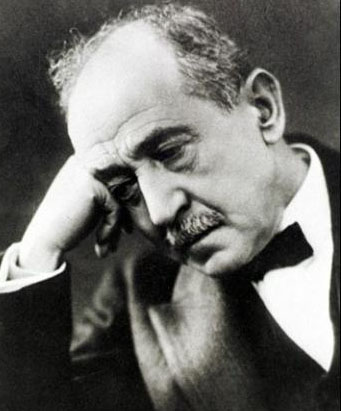
Ahmad Shawqi

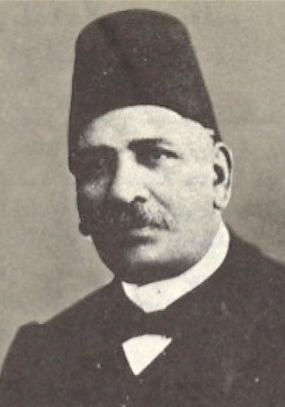
Boutros Ghali

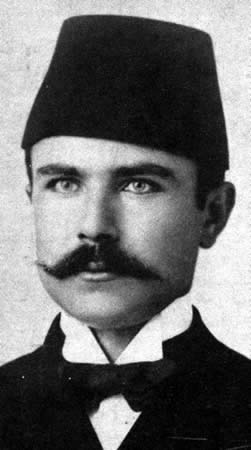
Faris al-Khoury

A number of notable men, famous for their ideas and writing frequented the literary salons and contributed to the discussions. Some of them developed friendships with the female hostesses and asked them for their advice and opinions on their work. Among those who visited the salons was the advocate of women's rights and writer, Qāsim Amin; the Islamic reformists, al-Imām Muhammad 'Abduh and Rifā'ah Rāfi' al-Tahtāwī; leader of the Egyptian Wafd Party, Sa'd Zaghlul; Lutfī al-Sayyid; the literary critic and journalist, 'Abbas Mahmũd al-'Aqqād; the Syrian poet, Khalil Mutrān; the journalist Muhammad Husayn Haykal; the poet Ahmad Shawqī; the Egyptian Prime Minister Boutros Ghālī and the Egyptian nationalist and writer, Tāhā Husayn. Several of these men published articles and books on women's rights; including Rifā'ah Rāfi' al-Tahtāwi and Qāsim Amin, who is said to have found the inspiration for his seminal works, Tahrir al-Mar'ah (The Liberation of Women) and al-Mar'ah al-Jadidah (The New Woman) in Princess Nāzlī al-Fādil's salon.

== Notable literary salons and societies ==
=== Marrash's Salon (Aleppo) ===
Maryana Marrash's salon, the first salon in the nineteenth-century revival movement, was run from the house she shared with her husband in Aleppo. The habitual gathering offered a private realm in which male and female guests could mingle, network, and discuss the fashionable topics of the time. Marrash would often entertain her guests by singing and playing the piano. Regulars at the salon included prominent literary figures and politicians, such as Abd al-Rahman al-Kawakibi, Qustaki al-Himsi, Rizqallah Hassun, Kamil al-Ghazzi and Victor Khayyat.

=== Princess Nāzlī Fādil's Salon (Cairo) ===
Nāzlī Fādil was one of the first women to revive the tradition of the literary salon and contributed immeasurably to the cause of women's emancipation in the Arab world. She began to invite guests to her Cairo salon towards the end of the nineteenth century, although the absence of female participants in her salon evenings should be noted. Like Maryana Marrash, Fādil added to the ambience in her salon by playing the piano, while one of her male guests sang and her Tunisian maid danced. The men who frequented her salon were prominent in Egyptian and Arab society; including statesmen, diplomats, journalists, and literary figures. Among the regular visitors to her salon was the renowned Islamic Reformist thinker, Sheikh Mohammed 'Abduh, as well as Qāsim Amin, Boutros Ghali and Saad Zaghloul, to name but a few.

=== The Dawn of Syria (Beirut) ===
In 1880, the Lebanese writer Maryam Nimr Makariyus established the Dawn of Syria literary society in Beirut.

=== The Association of the Arab Women Awakening (Beirut) ===
This literary society was founded by Muslim women in Beirut in 1914.

=== Katy Antonius' Salon (Jerusalem) ===
Katy Antonius ran what has been described as 'the focal point of Jerusalem social life' from the home in Sheikh Jarrah she shared with her husband, Arab nationalist George Antonius, during the Mandate period. The salon provided local journalists, officials, officers, politicians and European diplomats with an opportunity to network and discuss literary, social and political issues. Her parties were described as 'elaborate affairs' with 'evening dress, Syrian food, and drink, and dancing on the marble floor.' From time to time Antonius invited the boys from her orphanage to her salon evenings, as well as an array of famous guests.

=== Mayy Ziyadah's Salon (Cairo) ===
Shortly before the outbreak of the First World War, Mayy Ziyadah began to host well-known men and women from intellectual, literary and political circles across the Arab world. Meetings were held at her family home, the first salon in Cairo in which men and women met together in the same room. In terms of etiquette, Ziyadah maintained a 'tactful correspondence' with guests of her salon, who were expected to inform her of their attendance through letters as a matter of courtesy. She and her guests also published letters they wrote from conversations in the salon.

A Syrian Christian journalist, Salim Sarkis, a typical representative of the educated middle class clientele who used to frequent the gatherings, attended Ziyadah's salon, which was held on Tuesday evenings for twenty-three years, 1913–1936. The influence of Ziyadah's time spent in the salons of France is obvious, with Sarkis comparing her to notable French "salonnières". The journalist gives the reader a rare insight into the atmosphere of the salon in the following description:

In the evening of every Tuesday the house of Mr Ilyas Ziyadah, the owner of Al-Mahrusah newspaper, turns into a luxurious house in Paris, and his daughter Mayy, the Syrian young woman who is still in her twenties, into Madame de Staël, Madame Récamier, A'ishah Al-Ba'uniyyah, Walladah bint Al-Mustakfi and Wardah Al-Yaziji. Mayy Ziyadah's salon turns into an 'Ukaz fair [an annual fair in pre-Islamic Mecca, where the likes of Al-Khansa and other literary greats recited poetry] where literary, philosophic and scientific ideas propagate.

The salon evenings ended after her mother's death in 1932, as social pressure would not permit an unmarried woman to enjoy the company of men without members of her family present. A eulogy by Syrian poet Khalil Mutran mourned Ziyadah's death and the passing of her salon:

Oh Mayy! The house was deserted, where is your salon which visitors frequented? / The best elite of the East and West in nobility and erudition seek protection under your boundless wing...

=== Huda Sha'arawi's Salon (Cairo / Beirut) ===
Sha`arawi's salon only met sporadically, but was well-attended by many famous political figures and intellectuals; including Ahmad Shawqi, Gabriel Taqlā and Muhammad Husayn Haykal. She loved music, and would often play the piano long into the night whilst in her salon. Sha`arawi used to award a literary prize every year, and would also encourage young writers from her salon by sending them to study in Europe at her own expense.

=== The Women's Literary Club (Damascus) ===
The Damascus Women's Literary Club was founded by Mary Ajami around 1920, and was aimed at strengthening the bonds between women. It held public meetings, giving its members a platform on which to air their views on literary and political issues. Occasionally they discussed politics, but they were mainly interested in reviving classical Arabic literature and familiarising themselves with modern Western thought. According to Joseph T. Zeidan, those who frequented the salon were treated to the melodic tones of Mary’s sister’s piano playing, as well as the insightful and witty comments of Mary herself, who was ".. highly praised for her ability to run the intellectual discourse and was acknowledged as a ‘skilled talker’".

=== Sukaynah's Salon (Damascus) ===
Thurayya Al-Hafez, a school teacher and popular feminist, launched a salon evening in her house in Damascus in 1953. The salon was named after Sukaynah Bint Al-Husayn, the first Arab woman to host a salon. It was open to both men and women, though only the latter were in charge of running the proceedings. Its objectives included "...raising literary and artistic standards, creating strong bonds and cooperation among its members, publishing their works, translating Western literary works into Arabic, and translating Arabic literature into foreign languages. It continued to run until 1963, when its founder moved to Egypt.

== Pioneering women behind the salons ==
- Maryana Marrash (1849-1919) was the first Arab woman in the nineteenth century to revive the tradition of the literary salon in the Arab world, with the salon she ran in her family home in Aleppo.
- Zaynab Fawwāz (?1860-1914), who founded a salon in Damascus.
- Princess Nazli Fadil (c.1884−1914)
- Huda Sha'arawi (1879–1947) became one of the most famous feminists in the Arab world. In 1914, she formed al-Ittihād al-Nisā'i al-Tahdhĩbĩ (Women's Refinement Union), where Egyptian and European came together to discuss new ideas. This led to the establishment of the Jami'yyat al-Ruqiyy a;-Adabiyyah li al-Sayyyidāt al-Misriyyāt (Egyptian Ladies Literary Improvement Society). In the 1920s, Sha`arawi began to hold regular meetings for women at her home, and from this, the Egyptian Feminist Union was born. She launched a fortnightly journal, L'Égyptienne in 1925, in order to publicise the cause.
- May Ziyadah (1886−1941) is the best known of the women associated with the literary salons and as a leading figure in literary circles throughout the Arab world.
- Mary 'Ajami (1888−1965) founded the Damascus Women's Literary Club in 1920.
- Katy Antonius (née Nimr, d. 1984), born to Egyptian-Lebanese parents, experienced a privileged upbringing and education in Alexandria as the daughter of a prominent Egyptian publisher and landowner. In 1927, she married the intellectual and Arab nationalist, George Antonius. She was a fashionable socialite known for her wit, humour, kindness, and charm; as well as her infamous parties and salon evenings. As well as her salon, Antonius established a boys' orphanage in Old Jerusalem called Dar al-Awlad.
- Thuraya Al-Hafez (1911-2000) 'launched her own literary and political salon in Damascus, which was open to both genders. The salon was convened in her own house and was named after Sukayna bint al-Hussein, the great-granddaughter of Muhammad, who presided over the first literary salon in Muslim history'. The salon was launched in 1953.
- Salma Sayegh (1889 – 1953), Lebanese novelist

== Modern-day salons ==
In the 1960s, women and their ideas started to become part of the mainstream culture, and thus the important role of women-run salons declined in its importance. That said, The Women's Literary Club, which was founded by Mary 'Ajami in 1922, continues to run in Damascus, and was attended regularly by the novelist Ulfat Idilbi until her death in 2007.

In 2010, a new weekly salon evening for young male and female writers and literary enthusiasts was launched in the basement of a hotel in Damascus. The popular event held on Monday evenings, named Bayt al-Qasid (House of Poetry), was an opportunity for new voices rather than established poets or writers, and attracted both Syrians and foreigners.
