= Arab Awakening =

Arab Awakening may refer to:

- Al-Nahda, a 19th-century intellectual movement.
- The Arab Revolt, a revolt against Ottoman rule of the Arabian Peninsula.
- The Arab Spring, a series of revolutions and protest movements that began in December 2010.
- The Arab Awakening, a 1938 book written by George Antonius that is viewed as the foundational textbook of the history of modern Arab nationalism.
