= Soraya Antonius =

Palestinian writer, filmmaker (1932–2017)

- Born: November 4, 1932; Jerusalem, Mandatory Palestine
- Died: January 12, 2017 (aged 84); Beirut, Lebanon
- Education: Slade School of Fine Art
- Occupations: Author, journalist, editor, publisher, curator, filmmaker
- Parents: George Antonius (father); Katy Nimr (mother)

Soraya Antonius (November 4, 1932 – January 12, 2017) was a Palestinian author, journalist, editor, publisher, curator and filmmaker.

== Life and career ==
Soraya Antonius was born on November 4, 1932, in Jerusalem, then the capital of Mandatory Palestine. She was the only child of the Lebanese author and diplomat George Antonius, and the socialite, hostess, and philanthropist Katy Nimr. After attending Cheltenham Ladies' College in Gloucestershire, England, and the Slade School of Fine Art in London, she lived for many years in Beirut, Lebanon.

In Beirut she worked as a journalist, editor, publisher, and curator. A founding member of the Fifth of June Society, organized to educate journalists and the general public about Palestine, she wrote and produced a documentary film about the Palestinian revolution, Resistance – Why? (1971), directed by Christian Ghazi. She was also the author of two novels, The Lord (1986) and Where the Jinn Consult (1987).

Antonius died on January 12, 2017, in Beirut.

== Publications ==
- Antonius, Soraya (1987). Where the Jinn Consult. London: Hamish Hamilton. ISBN 9780241123676.
- Antonius, Soraya (1988). The Lord (1st American ed.). New York City, NY: H. Holt. ISBN 9780805004779.
