= FPA =

FPA may refer to:

== Broadcasting and entertainment ==
- Fancy Pants Adventures, an online game
- Feminist Porn Award, a Canadian adult film award
- Fundação Padre Anchieta, a Brazilian educational media foundation
- First-person adventure, an adventure game played from a first-person perspective
- "First-person adventure" as a phrase used by Nintendo to advertise the 2002 action-adventure game Metroid Prime

== Education ==
- Florida Preparatory Academy, in Melbourne, Florida, United States

== Foreign policy ==
- Foreign policy analysis
- Foreign Policy Analysis (journal), a scholarly journal
- Foreign Policy Association, a US non-governmental organization

== Government bodies ==
- Fertilizer and Pesticide Authority, in the Philippines
- First Peoples' Assembly, Victoria, Australia
- Fuerzas de Policia Armada, the former Spanish Armed Police
- Kela (Finnish institution) (Swedish: Folkpensionsanstalten - FPA), in Finland

== Law ==
- Federal Power Act, in the United States
- Flag Protection Act, in the United States
- Former Presidents Act, in the United States

== Professional and trade organizations ==
- Financial Planning Association, in the United States
- Fire Protection Association, in the United Kingdom
- Florida Philosophical Association, in the United States
- Food Products Association, in the United States

== Science and technology ==
- Fibrinopeptide A, a compound in coagulation
- Floating Point Accelerator, a math coprocessor for early ARM processors
- Flower pollination algorithm
- Focal-plane array
  - Focal-plane array (radio astronomy)
- Function point analysis

== Sport ==
- Formula Palmer Audi, a form of motor racing
- Paraguayan Athletics Federation (Spanish: Federación Paraguaya de Atletismo)

== Other uses ==
- Cairo Foreign Press Association, in Egypt
- Family Planning Association, a British sexual health charity
- The Family Planning Association of Hong Kong
- Flygprestanda, a Swedish aviation company
- Fort Abbas railway station, in Pakistan
- Franklin P. Adams (1881–1960), American columnist and poet who used F.P.A. as a nom-de-plume
- Facility Planning Area, sewer planning in the United States
