= Labiba Hashim =

Lebanese author (1882–1952)

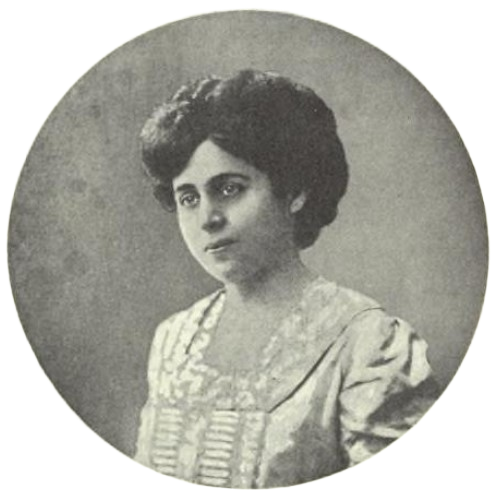
- Born: 1882; Kfarshima, Lebanon
- Died: 1952 (aged 69–70)
- Occupation: Author
- Spouse: Abdo Hashim
- Parent: Nassif Madi

Labiba Hashim (لبيبة هاشم) (1952-1882) was a Lebanese author who founded and published Fatat al-Sharq (Girl of the East- "فتاة الشرق") magazine in Cairo in 1906, one of the first female-oriented magazines of the Arab world. In the magazine Hashim advocated for women's rights, especially rights related to women's education and involvement in politics. Today, many researchers are working to collect information about Hashim in order to preserve her heritage and legacy .

== Early life ==
Labiba Hashim, the daughter of Nassif Madi, was born in Kfarshima, Lebanon in 1882. Her father sent her to a nun school "Sisters of Love School and the English Missionary School" in Lebanon. She learned French and English in her teenage years. She also studied at the American University of Beirut, also referred to as AUB.

She contributed to the publication of Al Hilal, Thurayya, Al Bayan, and Al Diya.

=== Marriage ===
Labiba Hashim was married to Abdo Hashim, an author.

== Death and legacy ==
Labiba Hashim died in 1952. After her death, she was referred to as the hard-working woman who had good conduct. Labiba proved that women can equally work and be successful in their life, just like men if they find the opportunity to do so, work hard and are ambitious. She also left behind Fatat Al Sharq magazine, that affected the works and activities of women for many years. As a matter of fact, Labiba was confident, self-assured of the ideas she advocated and hard-working in her field. The poet Al Arz Chebli el Mallat talked about her, saying that nothing is more important than words that speak the truth, not even the beauty of Shirine, or the throne of the Queen Balkis. In other words, he is saying that the freedom of press is more important that beauty and luxury.

== Career ==
In 1904, Labiba Hashim published the novel Qalb al-rejul (A Man's Heart) a romantic tale featuring an Egyptian girl of Syrian heritage. She also translated several novels into Arabic such as the Arabic and French lectures for the Cairo University.

In 1906, she published her magazine, Fatat al-sharq, one of the first women magazines in the Arab world.

In 1911, Hashim was assigned to be a lecturer in Cairo University where she became the first woman in History to teach in Arab universities. After eight years, in 1919, King Faisal appointed her to be the first general inspector of women's schools in Damascus. She also set up an office in Cairo which employed a number of women freelancer journalists, editors, and typesetters. Most significantly, she was the first woman with a government post in Syria.

In 1921, after King Faisal left Syria following the Battle of Maysalun, she went back to Egypt and then traveled to Chile, South America.

In 1923, she established a magazine in Santiago and named it "East and West". In South America, she learned about different cultures while she was successfully managing her magazine.

In the next year, Labiba returned to Egypt to resume her work as the translator, author, distribution manager, and editor-in-chief of her first magazine Fatat al-Sharq. She contributed to her magazine for consecutive 24 years.

Hashim later created a campaign against gambling, because she believed it caused problems in the society. Labiba blamed the West for developing it, calling it a "disease".

Due to conflict, she returned to Egypt. In 1921, she immigrated to Chile, and published for Al-Sharq Wa-al-Gharb magazine.

In 1942, she returned to Egypt and resumed working on Fatat al-sharq. She also published Kitab al-Tarbiya (The Book of Education) that includes her lectures in Egypt, Beirut, Zahle, Bhamdoun, and Damascus. The book is a compendium of her teachings particularly about the differences in education between genders. Other books she authored are Jawame' al Kalem (about wisdom) and Mabahis Fil Akhlak.

Hashim also discussed the difference between men and women's viewpoint concerning women's lives and stories. She believed women can describe their experiences and stories more than men as they are the only ones that can understand what women go through.

After acknowledging Labiba Hashim's accomplishments and success, Ibrahim al-Yaziji said: "She is the student who surpassed her teacher."

== Philosophical and/or political views ==
Hashim supported King Faisal, who was an advocate of women's rights. She, along with Salma Sayegh, Nazeq al-Abed, and Ibtihaj Qaddura, fellow women's right activists, worked towards establishing a law that provides women voting rights.

== Works ==
=== Published work ===
==== Fatat Al Sharq ====
Labiba Hashim wrote and published several works. Fatat Al Sharq was published in 1906, when she was eighteen years old. The magazine addresses social, historical, moral, artistic, sports and educational topics, publishing 28 volumes till 1939. It was at the same time scientific, literary, historical and fictional. Fatat Al Sharq was supervised by Michel Tahan, and was released for the first time on October 15, 1906, in the middle of every month, except in August and September. Because of world war I, the magazine ceased publication. However, while Hashem was in Chile, she authorized Assaad Dagher, one of her close relatives to publish the magazine. It was printed at Al Faggala printing press, in Egypt, and also in other neighborhoods in the Arab printing press, for Khair El Din Al Zerkli.

==== Reasons to Publishing the Magazine ====
In the introduction to the first issue, Labiba stated the reason for the publishing of the magazine, because she valued the importance of the press in any society. The press, in her opinion, has the power to transform societies and change individuals' minds. However, during Hashim's time, most magazines and newspapers were published by men, which irritated her, as she believed that men do not know or understand the experiences women go through. This motivated her to publish her own magazine, one that was primarily centered to serve the women of her society. Her magazine's goal was to elevate women's awareness and knowledge whether it was in literature or basic life lessons for housework. Hashim's main goal was to make women more present in the press and support their role in the society. As a wife, a mother, and an active member of society. She also wrote in her magazine with the intent of helping women become more virtuous and not just educated.

==== Contents of the magazine ====
- An introduction in which she specifies the purposes of publishing the magazine. On pages one to three.
- An article under the name of "Men of the East and Economics", رجال الشرق والإقتصاد. Labiba says that economics is an important subject that needs to be taught to children. On pages three to six.
- "A child's smile" إبتسامة طفل, about how a child's smile can give reassurance and make people forget about their problems. On pages six, seven and eight.
- "The Egyptian University," written by Zeinab Fawaz, in which she stands against ignorance, illiteracy and talks about the importance of education. On pages nine and ten.
- "The duties of a wife towards her man" واجبات الزوجة نحو رجلها, that includes tips any woman could need to become a good wife.
- "Antagonists names" أسماء الانصارية, in which she intends to talk about Yazid's daughter; one of the important Arab women that tells about women's duties, on pages sixteen and seventeen.
- "Women and clothing", المرأة والملابس that describes the type of clothing that suits women. On pages seventeen, eighteen, nineteen and twenty.
- "Etiquette and customs", آداب وعادات, that shows the habits of men and women. On pages twenty-one and twenty-two.
- "المحتالة الجميلة", rare and funny, on page twenty-three.
- "كل يذكر بأفعاله", that means everyone is remembered by his own actions. In this section, Labiba laments Shaheen Choucair, one of the members of the association that helps women.
- The story of "جزاء الأحسان".

The second issue that was published on 15 November 1906 contained:

- "نساء الشرق والإقتصاد ", that translates into women of the East and economics. In this section, Labiba talks about the extravagance and wasting that women that may be the source of conflicts.
- "اخطار المدينة في هذا العصر", the dangers of the city in this era. In the section, Labiba states that the city has many advantages (lines 37–40).
- "واجبات الزوج", the duties of a husband. In this section, Hashem states the most important obligations a spouse should do, and responsibilities he has to take in order to insure a happy life (lines 40–44.)
- "عكرشة إبنة الأطروش", she was an eloquent, literate thinker that endured the Siffin صفين war, and gave speeches, (lines 47–48).
- "Al Dinar", الدينار, a poem written by Nassim Al Aaz, (line 49).
- "كيف تخطب الإبنة في بلاد اسوج", that translates into how do females get engaged in Asuj. This section contains some of the traditions and customs of a woman getting engaged there.
- "متفرقات", which means miscellaneous. It contains some traditions; for example, how Chinese people kill their daughter after she is born, (line 52).
- "آثار أدبية", literary monuments. In this section Labiba talks about Moustafa Sadek al Rifai and about some of the verses he wrote, (lines 52–55).
- "فكاهات", funny anecdotes, the story of the dinar.

The third issue that was published on 15 December 1906 contained:

- "شهيرات النساء", famous women. Labiba mentions in the introduction of this article that she created it to share the stories of the various that became well known because of their works. For instance, she talked about Aisha Taymour, a poet and a revolutionary woman, (lines 65–67).
- "التمثيل العربي في مصر", that translates into Arab acting in Egypt, in which the author talks about its development and progress from when it first was created, (lines 68–71).
- "آفات المدينة الحاضرة", (line 72).
- "الاعتماد على النفس", self-reliance. She states that a person that relies on itself doesn't fail, (line 76).
- "رأي خبير فالزواج", an opinion of an expert in marriage. This section contains different points of view of various thinkers and experts about this subject, (line 80).
- "متفرقات"، "آثار أدبية" and "فكاهات".

The fourth issue that was published on 15 January 1907 contained:

- "شهيرات النساء", in which she talks about Al Khansa, that was a poet famous for "رثاء أخويها", (line 97).
- "رسالة في حالتنا الاجتماعية", a message for the society we live in, (line 99).
- "رأي خبير فالزواج", the opinion of an expert on marriage. It follows the article of the previous issue, (line 102).
- "التمثيل العربي في مصر", acting in Egypt, that follows the article of the previous issue, (line 105).
- "آداب وعادات", that translates into etiquette and traditions, "متفرقات" , "فوائد", "فكاهات" and "آثار أدبية".

==== Magazine Topics ====
In Fatat Al-Sharq, Labiba Hashim tackled a wide variety of topics using simple and direct language in order to target a wide audience. Her magazine included scientific, historical, and social topics. Not only that, the magazine even included translated stories, art, and sports. The aim of the article was to educate women in different fields. However, Labiba occasionally did minor modifications to some of the titles and sections. And in the ninth issue of the twenty-second year, Hashim affirmed that she added new pages and new sections that push her to work more.

==== Magazine's Recognition ====
Many notable authors and historians, highly valued Labiba Hashim's magazine Fatat Al-Sharq and its mission to support and give women their right to be heard. One author mentioned: "Fatat Al-Sharq is the first real magazine for women in the East." However, Fatat Al-Sharq shied away from publishing political issues, in fact, Warda al Yaziji, Jerji Baz, Afifa Karam, Khalil Mutran, Moustafa Sadek al Rifai and many others affirmed that Hashem distanced herself from politics because in her opinion when politics is included in literature, it corrupts it.

==== Conditions of Publishing the Magazine ====
The magazine passed through hard circumstances, where Hashim was not always able to find constant financial income. This led to a shortage in supply, forcing her to print her magazine for members only. Afterwards, the publication of the magazine ceased during World War I, as Labiba was not able to keep following up with it as she was in Chile. Therefore, Labiba entrusted Asaad Dagher, one of her close relatives, with her magazine. Afterwards, she returned to Egypt and re-administered the magazine.
