= Maryam al-Nahhas =

Arab activist and writer

Maryam al-Nahhas (1859–1888) was an Arab activist and writer.

Al-Nahhas was brought up in Beirut, Ottoman Empire. She married Nasim Nawfal when she was about sixteen years old, and the couple moved to settle in Alexandria. She wrote a biographical dictionary of women, Ma'rid al-Hasna' fi Tarajim Mashahir al-Nisa' (Dictionary of the exemplary in the lives of famous women). The first volume was published in 1879, dedicated to its sponsor, Isma'il Pasha's third wife, Princess Cheshmat Hanim. However, the manuscript of the second volume was lost in the confusion of the ‘Urabi Revolt.

Her daughter was the journalist Hind Nawfal.
