= Kamala Satthianadhan =

18th-Century Indian writer and feminist

Kamala Satthianadhan (1880–1950) was an Indian writer, feminist, and editor. She established and edited the Indian Ladies' Magazine, a popular local publication that was in circulation between 1901 and 1938.

== Life ==
Kamala Satthianadhan was born as Hannah Ratnam Krishnamma, in 1880. She was home-schooled, and later attended Noble College, graduating with a B.A. in 1898, after studying Sanskrit and Indian literature.

In 1898 after graduating, she married Noble College professor Samuel Satthianadhan, a widower whose first wife, the writer Krupabai, had died in 1893. Following custom, she changed her name to Kamala Satthianadhan. They had several children, and their daughter Padmini Satthianadhan Sengupta became a writer; her memoir of her mother, Portrait of an Indian Woman (1965) is one of the primary sources of information on Satthianadhan's life.

Samuel Satthianadhan died in 1906, and Kamala Satthianadhan supported her family by tutoring a local Rani (queen) in Sanskrit. In 1918, she travelled with her children to the United Kingdom to provide them with higher education there, returning in 1923. She died in 1950.

== Career and writing ==
Satthianadhan established the Indian Ladies' Magazine in 1901 with the intention of recording and writing about reforms relating to women's rights. The magazine soon gained popularity, being in local circulation until 1915, when she left for the United Kingdom to provide her children with a graduate education. While she was away her sister S. G. Hensman was editor, but the magazine ceased active circulation. On her return to India, Satthianadhan became active in the Indian independence movement, and re-started the magazine in 1927, this time with a greater focus on politics, and continued to run it until it stopped circulation in 1938. Contributors to the magazine included political activist and poet Sarojini Naidu, writer and educator Begum Rokeya, lawyer and writer Cornelia Sorabji, politician and Theosophist Annie Besant, feminist and educator Pandita Ramabai, and Satthianadhan's niece, and missionary and teacher Mona Hensman.

Before and after her stay in the United Kingdom, Satthianadhan was active in women's groups and social service organisations, establishing nine co-operative societies for women in Andhra Pradesh and the Madras Presidency, to help women gain financial independence. She also established a center in Tirunelveli aimed at providing care for pregnant women and children, worked with the Red Cross and YMCA, and supported anti-discrimination measures aimed at the caste hierarchy. Satthianandhan was also a member of the senates of Andhra University and Madras University.

In 1898, along with her husband Samuel, she published a collection of stories titled Stories of Indian Christian Life, each of them contributing six stories, chiefly consisting of religious parables. She also published several stories and critical essays on literature and politics in the Indian Ladies' Magazine, along with regular editorial features supporting early feminist movements in India. Her daughter's biography indicates that during her life Satthianadhan published three novels, including one titled Detective Janaki about a young female detective, but these are no longer in print.

== Sources ==
- Logan, Deborah Anna (2017). The Indian Ladies' Magazine, 1901–1938: From Raj to Swaraj. Lehigh University Press. ISBN 9781611462227.
- De Souza, Eunice (2005). The Satthianadhan Family Album. New Delhi: Sahitya Akademi. ISBN 9788126021277.
