= The Indian Ladies' Magazine =

Indian women's periodical

The Indian Ladies' Magazine, established by Kamala Satthianadhan in 1901 in Madras, was the first English-language Indian women's magazine created and edited by a woman. Satthianadhan was encouraged by her husband, Dr. Samuel Satthianadhan, a prominent educationist and reformer, to start a journal for women at the dawn of the twentieth century.

The magazine appeared in two publishing phases: monthly from 1901 to 1918, and bimonthly from 1927 to 1938. A hiatus occurred between these two periods due to financial and personal circumstances that prevented Satthianadhan from continuing publication. During the second phase, Satthianadhan's daughter, Padmini Satthianadhan Sengupta, served as Assistant Editor and played a significant role in managing the publication.

The magazine promoted dialogue on religion, gender, society, and culture, emphasising cooperation rather than political divisiveness. It provided a platform to examine women's roles in both private and public spheres, as well as their progress in society, at a time when colonial norms and patriarchal ideas of gender were increasingly being questioned.

== Readership and reception ==
The magazine primarily catered to English-educated South Asian women. Subscriptions in India, Ceylon (now Sri Lanka), and Burma (now Myanmar) were priced at ₹4, while it was available in the United States for $1.50 and in Britain for 6 shillings. To reach a wider readership and to make the contents more accessible to women unfamiliar with English, the magazine included a section in Telugu and also facilitated translations into vernacular languages such as Tamil, Telugu, and Malayalam.

The magazine received a favourable response at its inception and was noted positively in press reviews by publications such as the Bombay Guardian, Daily Telegraph, The Indian Daily News, and the Madras Standard. The London Times described it as "bright and interesting," while The Voice of India considered it a "valuable accession" to Indian journalism. However, its finances were affected by the economic strains of the First World War and the approach of the Second World War. In 1915, Kamala Satthianadhan appealed to readers through the magazine to secure new subscriptions, presenting it as an important medium for advancing the cause of Indian women. She also organised a concert at Victoria Hall to raise funds both for the war effort and to sustain the Indian Ladies' Magazine.

Shifts in readership preferences and a changing socio-political climate also affected the magazine's relevance. When it first ceased publication, new and more politically conscious journals such as Stri-Dharma emerged, moving away from the image of the genteel woman and fostering that of the socially responsible modern woman. The declining influence of the Indian Ladies' Magazine was reflected in its subscriber base during its second run. While the magazine Camd recorded an average of 15,000 subscribers in 1930, the Indian Ladies' Magazine had only about 300.

== Contents ==
The magazine addressed Indian concerns on subjects such as women's work, education, and the upbringing of children. It published original creative writing in the form of poetry, short plays, and serial fiction, along with instructive articles on needlework, cooking, and health remedies. Regular columns included fashion advice, reviews, news, and discussions on moral and ethical issues. The column "Ourselves" outlined the magazine's self-representation and editorial policy.

Articles also profiled pioneering women such as Pandita Ramabai, Cornelia Sorabji, Josephine Butler, and Helen Keller, presenting them as role models for readers. Proceedings of women's conferences, lectures, and congress speeches were published to promote public speaking skills, which were considered an important aspect of women's development.

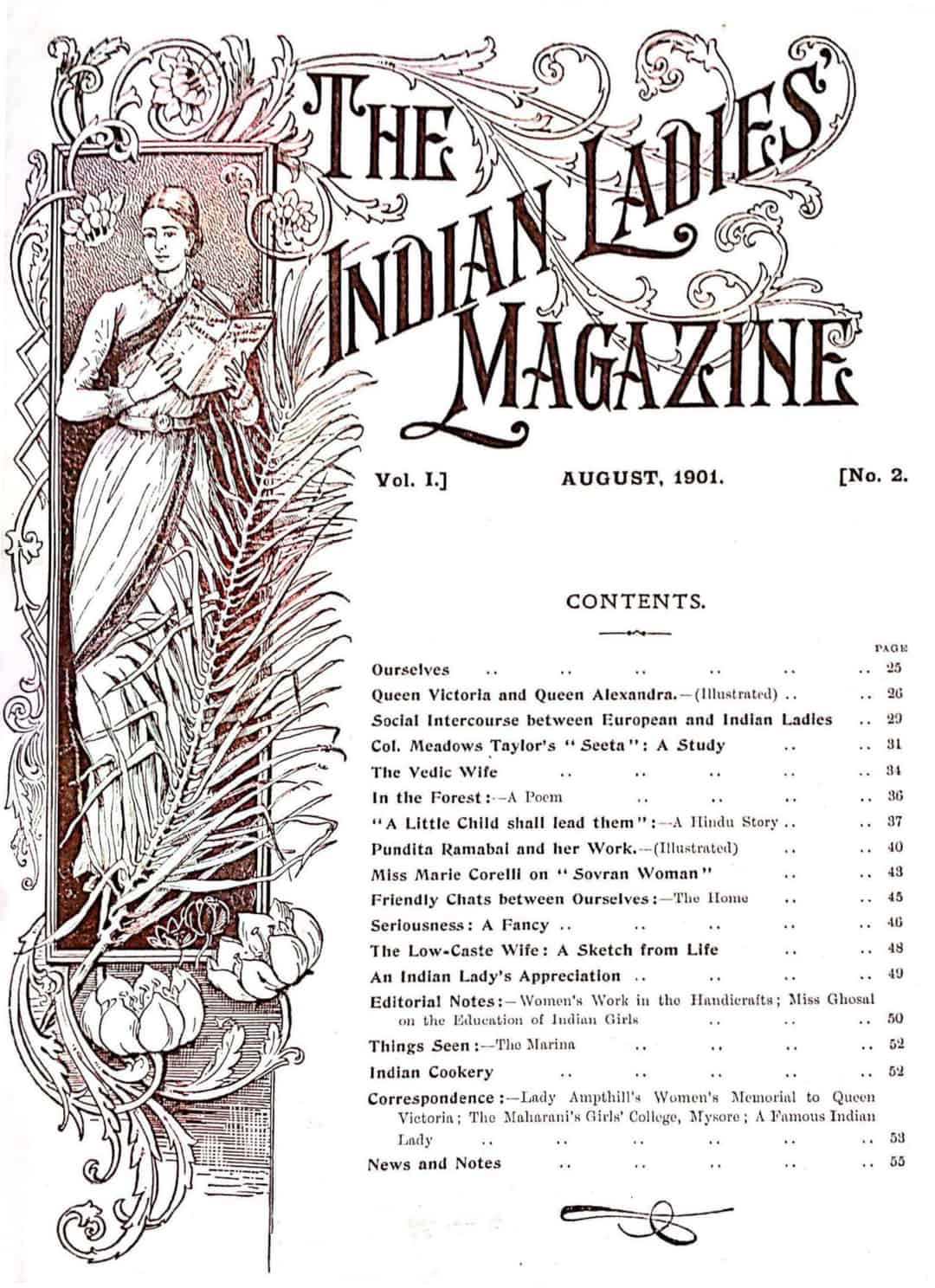
Contents page of the Indian Ladies' Magazine, August 1901

To generate financial support, the magazine carried advertisements for Indian-made products and businesses in its front and back sections, aligning with the Swadeshi movement's promotion of local goods. Frequent advertisements included Robina Hair Oil, Amrutanjan balm, Silk Pitamber Co. Benarasi saris, Batliwala's tonic pills, and Ayurvedic medicines marketed as solutions to women's health concerns.

== Contributors ==
The contributors to the magazine were largely women, with both Indian and Anglo writers represented in significant numbers. The publication sought to provide a platform for both established authors and "young inexperienced writers". It also offered women the opportunity to write and publish anonymously, meeting a widespread aspiration of the time.

=== Notable writers ===
Among the prominent women who contributed to the magazine were political activist and poet Sarojini Naidu, whose early poems were first published in the Indian Ladies' Magazine; social reformer Begum Rokeya Hossain, whose story Sultana's Dream, published in 1905, remains one of the most recognised works of utopian and dystopian fiction; and author Atiya Fyzee-Rahmin, who wrote under the pseudonym "Shahinda" and represented the Muslim socialite voice of the magazine.

== Critique ==
During its second run, the magazine was criticised for not sufficiently engaging with women's political activities, for giving limited attention to the events of the national movement, and for attempting to balance the interests of the Raj and Swaraj. In response, Satthianadhan defended her position in the "Ourselves" column in 1930, arguing that other journals already focused on women's political participation, while her magazine concentrated on the broader aspects of women's development and their inward progress, which she considered equally significant.

Satthianadhan also expressed certain conservative views, such as her belief that a woman's proper sphere was the home, a perspective reflected in several of her writings for the magazine. Sarojini Naidu, once a close associate of Satthianadhan, distanced herself from the magazine during its second run, partly due to its limited political engagement.
