= Alexandra Avierino =

Lebanese journalist and poet

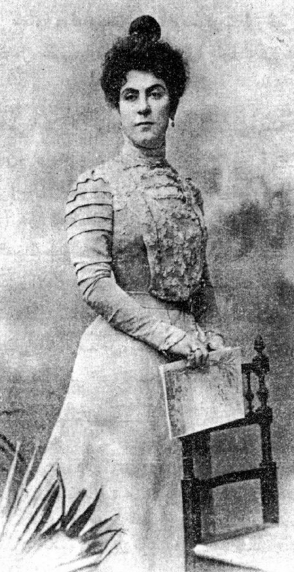
- Born: Hinda; November 1872 – 1937; Alexandra Constantine Khuri in Beirut
- Education: convent school
- Occupations: Journalist, *English-Lebanese writer
- Employers: women's magazine; al-Muqaṭṭam; Al-Mu'ayyad
- Notable work: Anis al-Jalis

Alexandra Avierino (November 1872 – 1937) was an English-Lebanese writer.

== Biography ==
She was born Alexandra Constantine Khuri in Beirut into a Greek Christian Orthodox family. She was educated at convent schools in Lebanon and then Alexandria. While still in her teens, she married Miltiades di Avierino, who was of Italian and Spanish descent. The couple had two daughters and a son. Avierino became a British subject through her marriage.

In 1898, she founded Anis al-Jalis ("The Sociable Companion"), a monthly women's magazine, also serving as its editor. In 1900, she travelled to Paris, where she represented Egypt at the conference of the Alliance universelle des femmes pour la paix, an international peace society, which was held during the Exposition Universelle of that year. Its founder Princess Gabrielle Wiszniewska bequeathed her title to Avierino, so after the princess died, she called herself Princess Alexandra di Avierino Wiszniewska. In 1901, she started a French literary review Le Lotus; it was expensive to produce and only appeared for a year. She continued to produce Anis al-Jalis until she was forced to shut it down for financial reasons in 1907.

Avierino also wrote poetry and a play. She held a literary salon where intellectuals, both women and men, could gather. She contributed to newspapers such as al-Muqaṭṭam (pro-British) and Al-Mu'ayyad (anti-British).

During the early 1920s, she was forced to travel to England to resolve issues related to her status as a British citizen. Then, in July 1924, she was arrested by Egyptian authorities and accused of being involved in an assassination attempt on Prime Minister Saad Zaghloul. After being interrogated and released, she left for England. On her return, she was denied entry into Egypt. She later died in London.
