= George Antonius =

Lebanese author, historian, and diplomat (1891–1942)

George Antonius جورج أنطونيوس
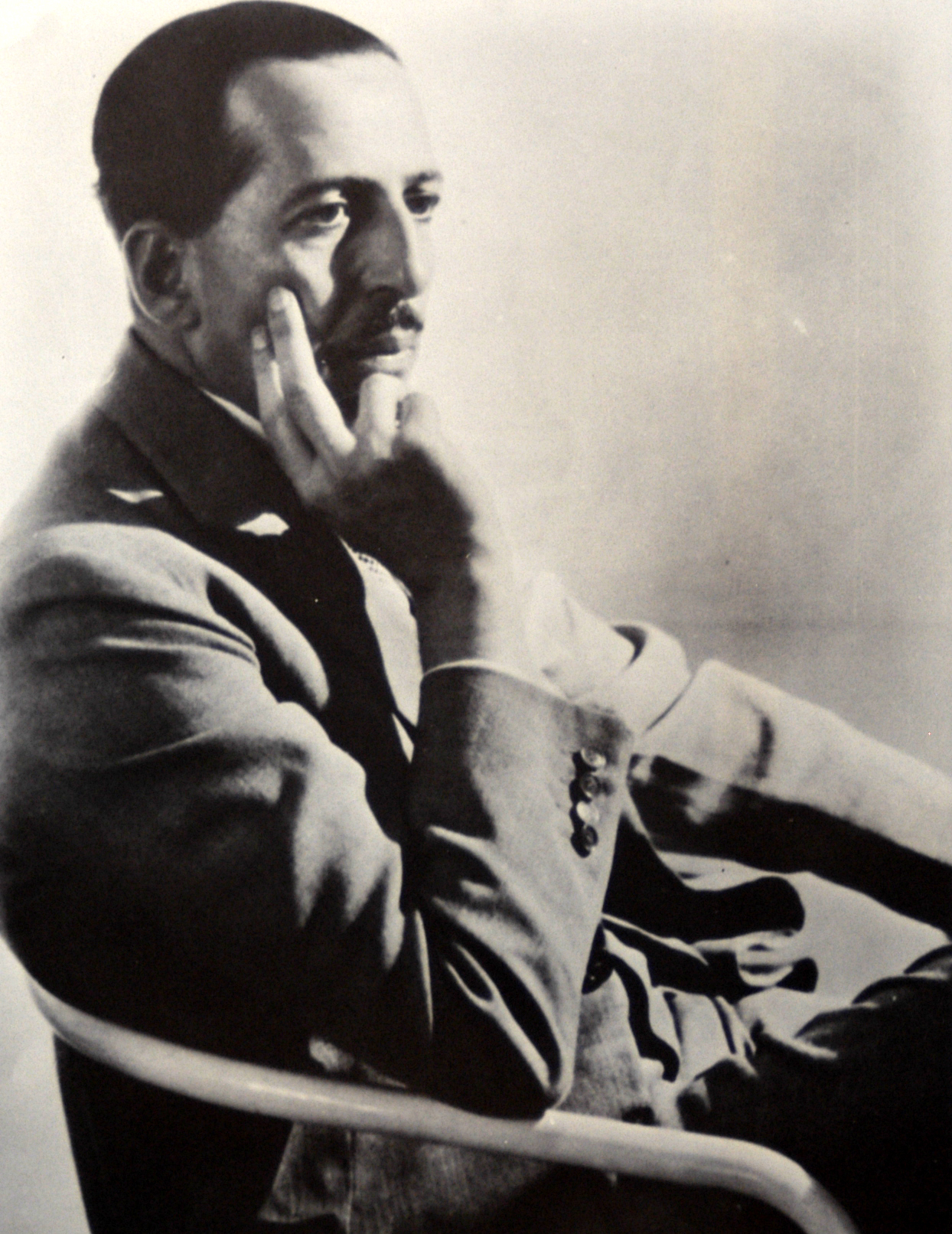
- Born: October 19, 1891; Deir al-Qamar, Mount Lebanon Mutasarrifate, Ottoman Empire
- Died: May 21, 1942 (aged 50); Jerusalem, Mandatory Palestine

Philosophical work
- Region: Eastern Mediterranean
- School: Arab nationalism
- Main interests: History, literature

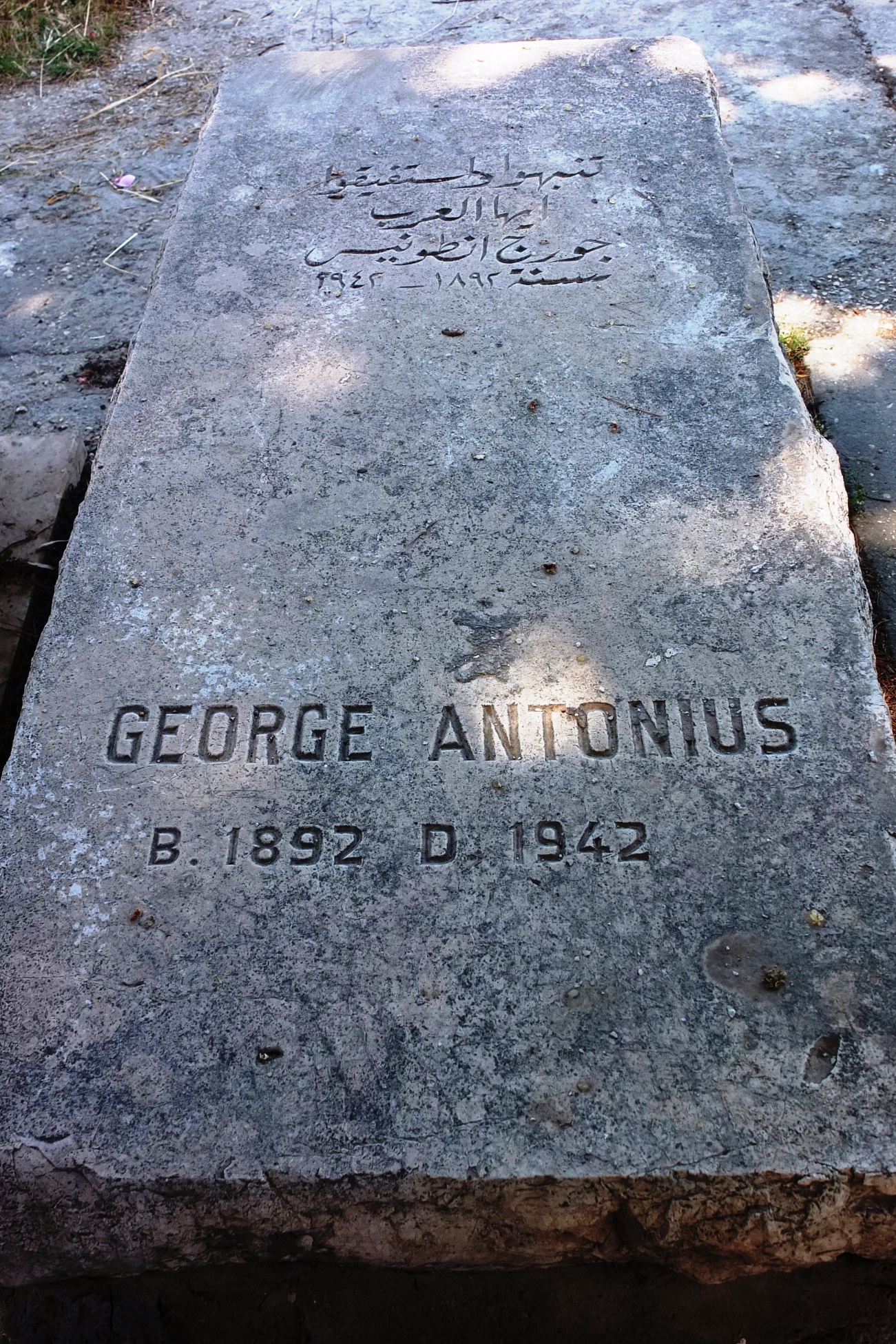
Tombstone of George Antonius at the Orthodox cemetery on Mount Zion in Jerusalem. The epitaph says "Heed and awaken, O Arabs".

George Habib Antonius, CBE (hon.) (Arabic: جورج حبيب أنطونيوس; October 19, 1891 – May 21, 1942) was a Lebanese author and diplomat who settled in Jerusalem. He was one of the first historians of Arab nationalism. Born in Deir al-Qamar to a Lebanese Eastern Orthodox Christian family, he served as a civil servant in the British Mandate of Palestine. His 1938 book The Arab Awakening generated an ongoing debate over such issues as the origins of Arab nationalism, the significance of the Arab Revolt of 1916, and the machinations behind the post-World War I political settlement in the Arab world. In the book, he raised concern about the fate of religious coexistence in Palestine in the face of Zionist settlement, while also recognizing the horror of anti-Jewish Nazism.

== Early life and career ==
Antonius was born on October 19, 1891 to an Eastern Orthodox Arab family in the Lebanese village of Deir al-Qamar. He was brought up in Alexandria, Egypt, where his father, Habib Antonius, was already well established.

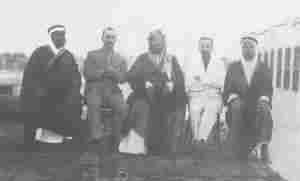
Sir Gilbert Clayton and George Antonius (in white suit) with King Abdul Aziz ibn Saud (centre), Jedda c 1925.

After graduating from Victoria College in Alexandria, Antonius enrolled at King's College at Cambridge University in 1914, after which he joined the British civil service in Egypt and then Mandatory Palestine. He then became the deputy in the Education Department in Palestine. In 1925, Antonius joined Gilbert Clayton in the newly formed Saudi Arabia, as his translator and advisor in the negotiations to agree on the boundaries of Saudi Arabia with Iraq, Transjordan and Yemen.

He resigned his position in 1930 to become the Middle East field representative of the Institute of Current World Affairs in New York City. He was secretary general to all the Arab delegations to the London Conference of 1939.

Antonius was a follower of Hajj Amin al-Husseini, the Grand Mufti of Jerusalem. He acted as a liaison officer for al-Husseini in negotiations between Palestinian Muslims and the Catholic Church to reach an anti-Zionist agreement. Antonius was among the first Arabs to promote pro-Arab positions regarding the Arab-Israeli conflict in universities in the United States.

== Philosophy ==
Antonius traced Arab nationalism to the reign of Mehmet Ali Pasha in Egypt. He argued that the Arab nation (which consists of racial and cultural-linguistic elements) has been "dormant" for centuries and that Protestant missionaries from the United States had a specific role in the renewal and "awakening" of the Arabic as a national language. He saw the role of the Syrian Protestant College as central to this development, although he notes that later on, by the end of the 19th century, that role has diminished, since the college initiated instruction in English. By then the torch of the movement had been passed to Arab intellectuals residing in Syria and in Europe and to Arab officers in the Ottoman army who formed a secret society to ultimately promote Arab nationalist interests. These officers proved particularly useful later during World War I after the leadership of the movement openly shifted allegiance to support the Entente.

Other than tracing the birth of the Arab national movement, Antonius also argued that it was Great Britain that dishonored its prior commitments to the Arabs and instead pursued its own colonial interests at the expense of what Antonius calls the "true will of the people," namely unity and independence of the would-be Arab state. He criticized the Allies for separating Lebanon and Palestine from Syria. "[E]ver since the Arab conquest, except for the interval of the Crusades, [Syria] had formed one political unit.[...] On every essential count, it was clear that the well-being and the future development of the country were bound to be retarded if its unity were to be destroyed. Nor had indications been lacking to show the strength of feeling in the country itself on the subject of unity. But all those considerations were ignored; and the Supreme Allied Council, mindful only of the appetites of its members, found that the only way to satisfy Great Britain and France was to divide Syria between them."

== Personal life ==
Antonius was the son-in-law of Faris Nimr who was a Lebanese journalist and founder of the newspaper Al Muqattam. His wife, who he married in 1928, Katy Nimr, was a daughter of Faris Nimr, a wealthy Lebanese Christian and cultural activist. Their daughter, Soraya Antonius (1932–2017), was the author of two significant novels chronicling British-ruled Palestine from the 1910s to 1948: The Lord (1986) and Where the Jinn Consult (1987).

Antonius had a difficult relationship with the British. Despite his senior position he and his wife were refused membership in the Jerusalem sports club which had a "No Natives" policy.

== Legacy ==
An annual lecture is given in his memory at St Antony's College, Oxford.

== Gallery ==
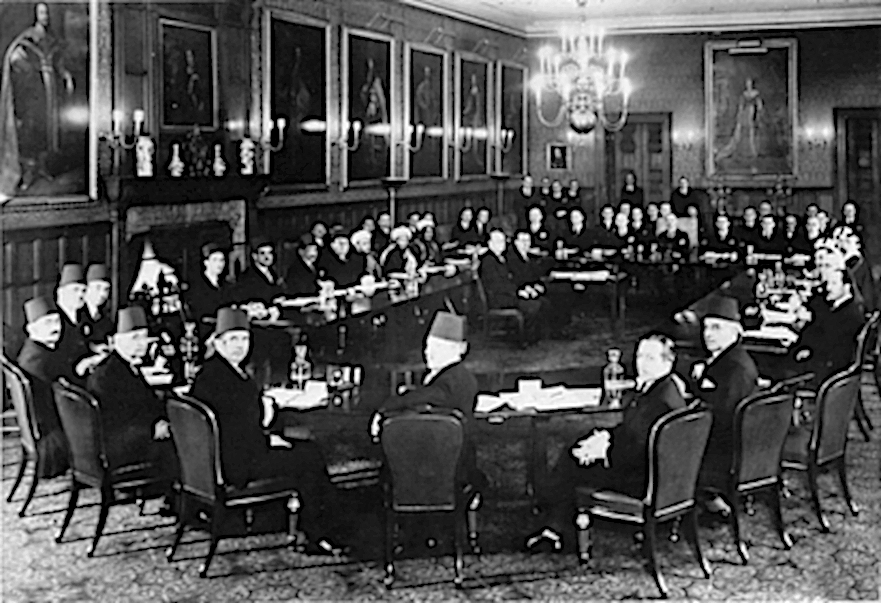
London Conference, St. James' Palace, February 1939. Palestinian delegates (foreground), Left to right: Fu'ad Saba, Yaqub Al-Ghussein, Musa Alami, Amin Tamimi, Jamal Al-Husseini, Awni Abdul Hadi, George Antonius, and Alfred Roch. Facing the Palestinians are the British, with Sir Neville Chamberlain presiding. To his right is Lord Halifax, and to his left, Malcolm MacDonald.

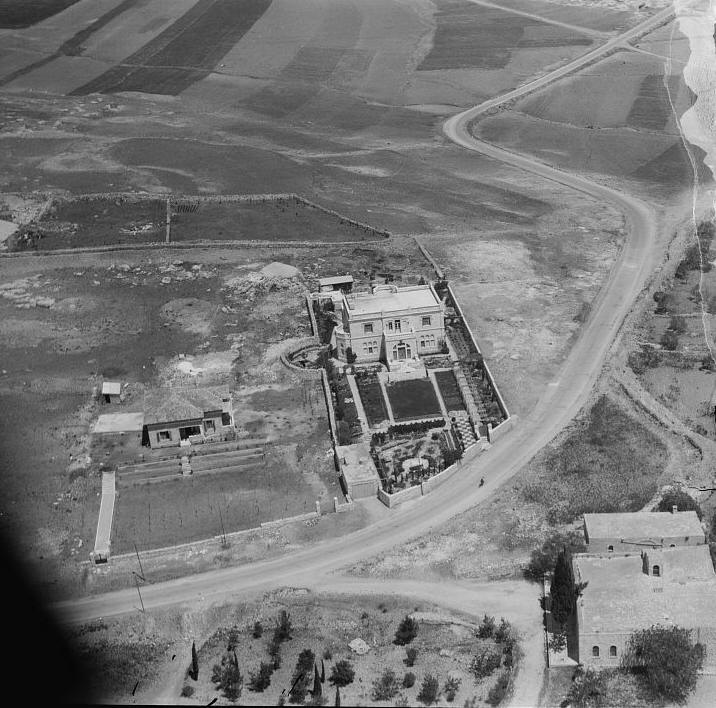
While writing The Arab Awakening, Antonius was a tenant at the Shepherd Hotel.

== Sources ==
- Antonius, G.; Nomico, Ch. A. (1924). "A Brief Account of the Painted tile Work in the Armenian Cathedral of St James". Jerusalem 1920–1922. London: 57-60.
- Silsby Boyle, Susan (2001). Betrayal of Palestine: The Story of George Antonius. Boulder, CO, USA: Westview Press. ISBN 0813337593.
