= Samuel Satthianadhan =

Indian writer and academic

Samuel Satthianadhan (1860 – 4 April 1906) was an Indian writer, educationist and social reformer.

== Early life ==
Satthianadhan was born in 1860 to missionary Rev W. T. Satthianadhan and his wife Annal Arockiam (anglicized to Anna John). Rev. Satthianadhan was a first-generation Hindu convert and was known as Thiruvengadam before his conversion. His ancestors were Vaishnavaite Balija Naickers from Madurai.

Satthianadhan had his schooling at Anglican High School, Vepery, Madras and joined Corpus Christi College, Cambridge in 1878. Satthianadhan returned to Madras in 1883 and joined the Indian government service.

== Career ==
Satthianadhan served as a headmaster of Rajahmundry School from 1883 to 1885 when he was appointed as a lecturer in the Government Arts College, Kumbakonam. In about 1890, Satthianadhan was appointed Professor of Logic and Moral Philosophy at the Presidency College, Madras.

He received the degree Doctor of Laws (LL.D.) from the University of Cambridge in February 1903.

== Family ==
Satthianadhan married Krupabai (1861–1893), daughter of Haripunt Khisty, a Maharashtrian Brahmin convert in 1883. Krupabai is the first Indian woman novelist to write in English. On Krupabai's death in 1893, Satthianadhan married Kamala who was 13 years younger to him. Kamala Satthianadhan graduated from the Presidency College, Madras in 1898, becoming the first woman in South India to complete her graduation.

== Works ==
- Missionary work in India: From a native Christian point of view. 1889.
- Four years in an English University. Srinivasa Varadachari & Co. 1893.
- History of education in the Madras Presidency. Varadachari. 1894.
- The present position and future prospects of the Indian Christian community. 1900.
