= Malaka Saad =

Lebanese journalist

Malaka Saad (Arabic: ملكة سعد) was a Lebanese journalist and author of al-Jins al-Latif magazine (Arabic: الجنس اللطيف [The Gentler Sex]). Her work was important for the development of the women's movement in Egypt.

== Biography ==
Very little is known about Malaka Saad's personal life, other than the fact that she spent most of it in Egypt. One possible reason for her stay in Egypt is that freedom of speech was more prevalent there than in Ottoman-occupied Arab states like Lebanon and Syria. In Egypt, Arab authors had better opportunities to publish their works in their native language. Malaka stressed the importance of involving women alongside men.

== Philosophical and political views ==
The opinions expressed in Saad's magazine, al-Jins al-Latif (Arabic: الجنس اللطيف), cover topics such as gender equality and marriageable age. The magazine's publications have moved away from any political affiliation and instead focused on its goal which, as Saad stated, is "to empower women as human beings who know that freedom is not about makeup, wearing luxurious clothes, showing off, and lacking self-restraint."

In her magazine, Saad called for gender equality and the ability of women to work in all sectors. This was influenced by the Women's Revolution of 1919 in Egypt. She believed that women's mental liberation was more important than their physical liberation, which, in her opinion, was useless for both women and their society.

== Published works ==
Malaka Saad published her own magazine under the title al-Jins al-Latif [The Gentler Sex] (Arabic: الجنس اللطيف), one of the first women’s magazines in the Arab world. The first issue of the magazine was published on 5 July 1908. Subsequent editions of the magazine were published monthly.

Her writings had Eastern women as the target audience with five main principles:

- Improve the status of Eastern women to achieve equality of status between them and Western women.
- Inform Eastern women of their status in relation to men.
- Make Eastern women understand their responsibility towards their country, family, children, and husbands.
- Help Eastern women get rid of the preconceived ideas of established customs and traditions.
- Soothe the minds of Eastern women's by occasionally including jokes
