= Matsadaash =

Matsadaash (Arabic for "Don’t Believe") is an Egyptian independent investigative media platform founded in 2018. In September 2026 the Egyptian authorities arrested and detained its entire news desk, accusing them of belonging to the outlawed Muslim Brotherhood.

== History ==
Originally founded as a fact-checking platform, the platform later expanded its activity to undertake investigative reporting in Egypt and other Arab countries.

In 2023 two of the website's editors were arrested, but released without charge after National Security Sector investigators found no Muslim Brotherhood links.

On September 28 and September 29, 2026, Egyptian authorities arrested six Matsadaash journalists: Mohamed Ashraf Abu Emeira, Abdallah Qadry, Islam Barakat, Omar Helal, Mohamed Mahmoud and Mohamed Adel.
