= Krupabai Satthianadhan =

Indian writer (1862–1894)

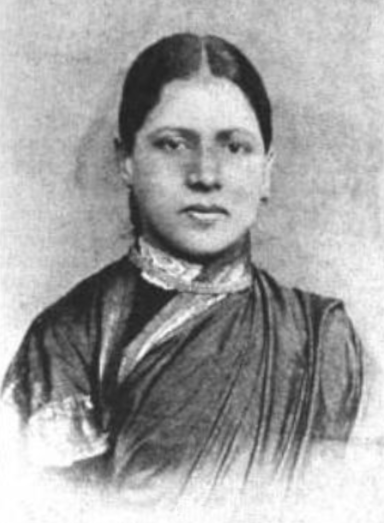
- Born: Krupabai Khisty; 14 February 1862; Ahmednagar, Bombay Presidency, British India (now in Maharashtra, India)
- Died: 8 August 1894 (aged 32); Madras, Madras Presidency, British India (now Chennai, Tamil Nadu, India)
- Occupation: Writer
- Spouse: Samuel Satthianadhan (m. 1881)

Krupabai Satthianadhan (1862–1894) was an Indian writer who wrote in English.

== Early life ==
Krupabai was born to Haripunt and Radhabai Khisty, Hindu converts to Christianity, in Ahmednagar, then in the Bombay Presidency, on 14 February 1862. Her father died when she was still a child, and she was brought up by her mother and elder brother, Bhasker. Bhasker, who was much older, had a strong influence on her and endeavoured to awaken her intellect by lending her books and discussing many issues with her. However, he too died young, and Krupabai immortalized him in her semi-autobiographical novel Saguna: A Story of Native Christian Life.

She also wrote another novel entitled Kamala, A Story of Hindu Life (1894). Both these novels are bildungsromane, in which she speaks about gender, caste, ethnicity and cultural identity. Despite the difference in social milieu, two novels deals with a similar theme: the predicament of women who resist being cast in the slandered mould of domesticity. Kamala and Saguna are both attracted to books and face varying degrees hostility such an unnatural inclination. Saguna is largely autobiographical. As the daughter of a Christian convert, the protagonist manages, despite the odds, not only to receive formal education, but also to get admission to a medical college, and eventually meets a man who could share her life as equal.

== Training in medicine ==
Krupabai was deeply wounded by Bhasker's death, and two European missionary ladies took charge of her and her education. This was her first encounter with the British at close quarters, and as Saguna shows it was a mixed experience. Later on she went to boarding school in the city of Bombay. She met an American woman doctor there who got her interested in medicine. Krupabai had absorbed her father's missionary ideals early in life and decided that by becoming a doctor she could help other women, especially those in purdah. By this time her health was already showing signs of deterioration, so although she won a scholarship to go to England and study medicine, she was not allowed to go. However, the Madras Medical College agreed to admit her in 1878, and she became a boarder at the house of the Reverend W. T. Satthianadhan, an extremely well known Christian missionary. Her academic performance was brilliant from the start, but due to strain and overwork she had her first breakdown in health a year later, and had to return to her sister in Pune to convalesce in 1879.

== Teaching career ==
A year later she was back at Madras, where she met and developed a friendship with Samuel Satthianadhan, the Reverend's son. In 1881 Samuel and Krupabai married. Soon after Samuel got a job as Headmaster of Breeks Memorial School in Ootacamund. In Ootacamund, Krupabai was able to start a school for Muslim girls with help from the Church Missionary Society, and she also taught in a number of other girls schools as well. Ootacamund was a hill station renowned for its salubrious climate and Krupabai's health stayed fair. She was able to find the time and energy to write, and published articles under the byline "An Indian Lady" in leading periodicals.

Three years later the couple moved to Rajamundry, and Krupabai became ill again, so they relocated to Kumbakonam. In spite of the changeableness of her health this was a very productive period for her, and by the time they returned permanently to Madras in 1886, she was ready to begin a full-scale novel. Saguna was serialised between 1887 and 1888 in the prestigious Madras Christian College Magazine. However, during this time her only child died before reaching its first birthday and she was plunged into depression for which she required treatment.

Her tuberculosis was diagnosed in Bombay but was certified beyond cure. Knowing that she had little time to live, she began work on Kamala. She worked continuously on the book till her death, breaking off only to write a memoir of her father-in-law and an unfinished one of her mother-in-law.

Satthianadhan died in Madras on 8 August 1894. Her death came as a great blow to her admirers, and just a few months afterwards a scholarship for women was set up in her memory at the Madras Medical College, as well as a memorial medal at the University of Madras for the best female Matriculation candidate in English. Her novels were published as books and translated into Tamil.

== Works ==
- Saguna: A Story of Native Christian Life, edited by Chandani Lokugé, (New Delhi: Oxford University Press, 1998).
- Kamala: A Story of Hindu Life, edited by Chandani Lokuge.
