= Warda al-Yaziji =

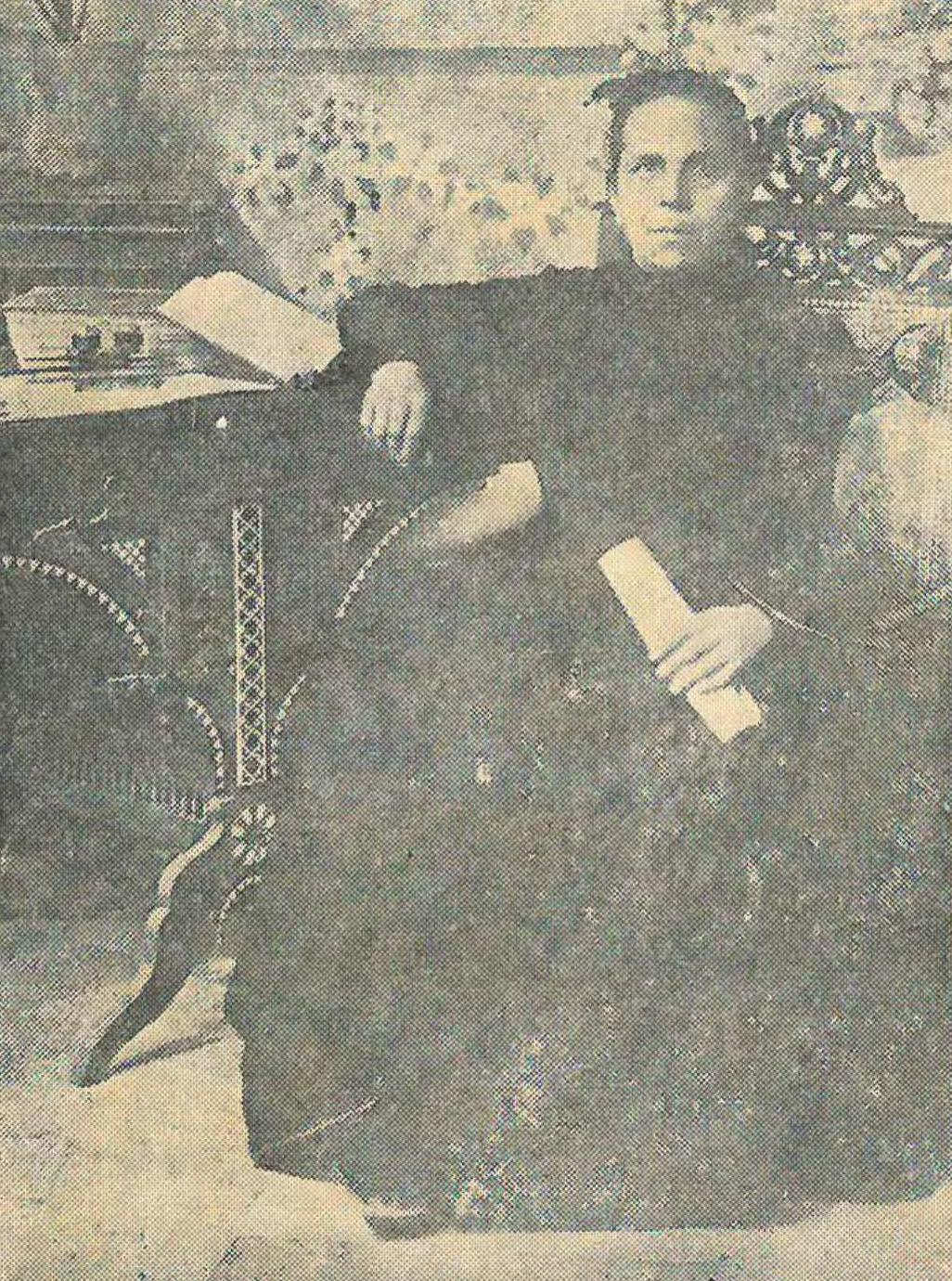
A picture of Warda al-Yaziji (1838–1924) Lebanese poet from "Adibat Lubnaniyat " by Emily Fares Ibrahim.

Warda al-Yaziji (1838–1924) was a Lebanese Christian poet who rose to prominence in the early twentieth century, and is considered a pioneer for opening up the field of writing to women.

== Personal life ==
Born in Lebanon in 1838, Warda was raised in an upper-class home and attended a private Christian school in the area. She was the daughter of poet and scholar Nasif al-Yaziji, and her brother was the notable scholar Ibrahim al-Yaziji, because of this she received a high level of education and was taught both French and Arabic. It is said that at the age of 13 she began to write poetry. As she got older, Warda began teaching at a school while continuing to write and married her husband Francis Shamun in 1866. They had five children together. After the death of her husband in 1899 she moved to Alexandria, Egypt.

== Work ==
Warda's poetry is said to represent the beginning of a renaissance because it "revived the traditions and aesthetics of poetry in the Golden Ages". She follows the more classical form of qasida which adds femininity to her writing. Unfortunately the qasida form of poetry has always been looked down on because of its embrace of femininity, so scholars have tended to denounced her work. Despite the denunciation, her poetry went on to inspire many women, most notably May Ziade who not only became a prominent writer but also went on to teach many courses over Warda's works. Ziade, in one of her lectures on Warda's poetry had this to say on her poems:

"If she informs us that the lines are composed about a female friend, we realize that they contain things addressed to a male friend, but she has hidden them behind the veil of the feminine pronoun to conform to social rules that require a woman to conceal her emotions, even in poetry."

She first published her book of poems called The Rose Garden in 1867, which would be republished a total of three times.

== Impact ==
Warda's pioneering status can be attributed not only to the male profession that she broke into, but also her support for broader women's rights. This can be seen during Warda's time in Egypt by her writings on women's issues in the Egyptian magazine, "Al Diya". Her support for women's rights led her to unveil herself in public, inspiring the designation of a commemorative portrait of her at the National Library in Beirut. Ziade published a eulogy for Warda in "Al-Muqtataf" which held Warda as a model and pioneer for future Arab women.
