= Keraliya Suguna Bodhini =

First Malayalam-language women's magazine

Kerali Suguna Bodhini (also known as Keraliya Sugunabodhini) is considered the first women's magazine in Malayalam. It was first published in 1886 in Trivandrum. It was published by Kerala Varma Valiya Koyi Thampuran, N.C. Narayana Pillai and K. Chidambaram Vadhyar.

The magazine came to a stop after six months. It was restarted in 1892. The early editions of the magazine had mostly literary articles. There were poems, reviews of literary works, short news items, biographies, short articles on Ayurveda, astrology, Sthreedharma, physiology, philosophy, cooking science, music, etc. The magazine may not have had actual women writers.

The annual price of the magazine was ₹2.

The 1976 edition of Sugunabodhini take on this sequence of writings that energise the moral conscience, cookery, biographies of ideal women, and other such enlightening topics promoting the domesticated, dedicated, motherly lady. It published nothing related to politics.
