= Cairo Foreign Press Association =

The Cairo Foreign Press Association is an organization of journalists representing non-Egyptian media in Egypt, founded in January 1977. The FPA has hundreds of members, both Egyptians working for non-Egyptian media and non-Egyptians. The FPA was founded to serve the interests of all its members in carrying out their professional requirements as foreign media correspondents in Egypt through the maintenance of communications with the competent Egyptian authorities, press conferences and trips and other activities. Volkhard Windfuhr was the head of the FPA from 1994 til 2020.
