= Fatat al-Sharq =

Egyptian women's magazine (1906–1929)

- Categories: Women's magazine
- Founder: Labiba Hashim
- Founded: 1906
- Final issue: 1929
- Country: Khedivate of Egypt
- Language: Arabic

Fatat al-Sharq (Arabic: فتاة الشرق; Girl of the East) was an Egyptian women's periodical first published in 1906 by Labiba Hashim when she was 18 years old, Though some sources date the magazine back to 1900. The magazine, one of the first examples of women's press in Egypt, produced 38 editions, publishing until 1929 and addressed social, historical, and educational topics, as well as fighting for women's emancipation through their right to education and their participation in politics in particular. Hashim also used the publication to engage in discourse and arguments with male writers.

She was motivated to publish her own magazine because of the lack of female writers at the time in Egypt and because she perceived the role of the press as important.

While publishing the periodical, she hosted a cultural salon at her house, in order to discuss it further, it became a popular retreat for writers, poets and journalists.
