= The Arab Awakening =

1938 book by George Antonius

The Arab Awakening: The Story of the Arab National Movement
- Author: George Antonius
- Language: English
- Genre: History
- Published: 1938 (Hamish Hamilton)
- Publication place: United Kingdom
- Media type: Print
- Pages: 470 pp

The Arab Awakening is a 1938 book by George Antonius, published in London by Hamish Hamilton. It is viewed as the foundational textbook of the history of modern Arab nationalism. According to Martin Kramer, The Arab Awakening "became the preferred textbook for successive generations of British and American historians and their students".

It generated an ongoing debate over such issues as the origins of Arab nationalism, the significance of the Arab Revolt of 1916, and the machinations behind the post-World War I political settlement in the Middle East.

== Analysis ==
Antonius traced Arab nationalism to the reign of Muhammad Ali Pasha in Egypt. He argued that the Arab nation (which consists of racial and cultural-linguistic elements) was "dormant" for centuries, and that institutions established by Protestant missionaries and educators from the United States had a specific role in the renewal and "awakening" of Arabic as a national language. He saw the role of the American University of Beirut (originally the Syrian Protestant College) as central to this development, although he noted that by the end of the 19th century that role had diminished because the college initiated instruction in English. According to Antonius, American missionaries, educators and institutions played a critical role in the development of American soft power during the Edwardian era and after World War I.

By the end of the 19th century, the torch of Arab nationalism had been passed to Arab intellectuals (residing in the region of Syria and in Europe) and to Arab officers in the Ottoman Army that formed a secret society to ultimately promote Arab nationalist interests. These officers proved particularly useful during World War I after the leadership of the movement openly shifted allegiance to support the Entente. Other than tracing the birth of the Arab national movement, Antonius also argues that it was Britain that dishonoured its prior commitments to the Arabs, and instead pursued its own colonial interests at the expense of what Antonius calls the "true will of the people," namely unity and independence of the would-be Arab state.

The book was only the second time that an authoritative translation of the McMahon letters had been published. This correspondence between the British High Commissioner in Egypt and the Sherif of Mecca occurred between October 1915 and January 1916 and was not officially released until the 1939 London Conference. Antonius concluded that Sherif Hussein understood these documents to mean that the British government was offering him an independent state if he joined the British in the war against the Ottoman Empire. This state would include Palestine. It was with these assurances that, on June 10, 1916, the Sherif ordered his army to attack the garrison in Mecca.

== Sources ==
Isaiah Friedman, A Twice Promised Land? Vol. 1. The British, the Arabs, and Zionism, 1915-1920, New Brunswick, NJ, 2000
