= Anis al-Jalis =

Monthly women's magazine in Egypt (1898–1907)

Anis al-Jalis (Arabic: أنيس الجليس / ALA-LC: Anīs al-Jalīs, lit. 'The Sociable Companion') was a monthly women's magazine published in Alexandria from 1898 to 1907. Its founder and editor was Alexandra Avierino, a British and Greek female writer who was born in Lebanon and spent most of her career life in Egypt. Though some contributors were women, including Esther Moyal, most were men. The magazine mostly covered articles on home economics, child-rearing practices, fashion and home decoration. At the initial phase Anis al-Jalis targeted bourgeois women, but later it addressed all society categories including rural women, creating sections for them.
