= Hind Nawfal =

Syrian writer

- Born: Hind Nawfal; 1860; Tripoli, Ottoman Syria
- Died: 1920 (aged 59–60)
- Spouse: Habib Dabbana
- Relatives: Maryam Nawfal (née al-Nahhas) (mother), Nasim Nawfal (father), Sarah (sister)
- Writing career
- Notable work: Al-Fatat magazine

Hind Nawfal (Arabic: هند نوفل, 1860–1920) was a Lebanese Antiochian Greek Orthodox journalist and feminist writer. She was the first woman in the Arab world and the broader MENA area to publish a women's magazine and an early promoter of feminism.

== Family and background ==
Hind Nawfal was born in Tripoli, modern-day Lebanon. Her mother, Maryam al-Nahhas was born in Beirut and raised during the civil unrest and economic depression in Beirut before marrying Nawfal's father Nasim when she was 16 and he was 10 years her senior. Nasim Nawfal was from a Greek Orthodox family from Tripoli and raised Hind as a Christian.

Nawal attended mission schools in Beirut until the family moved to escape the Ottoman censorship in Ottoman Syria and settled in Alexandria in the 1870s, where Hind attended a covenant school. During the reign of Khedive Isma'il Pasha, Egypt had abandoned its monopoly on publishing and from the time of the British occupation of Egypt in 1882 had also limited its censorship on the press. As the low and middle class began to invest in upper class literature, the number of printing presses had increased and thus the circulation of literary material as well.

Hind Nawfal was unique at the time in that she came from a household where both her mother and father were writers. Hind's mother, Maryam, completed a biographical dictionary, Ma’rid al-Hasna’ fi Tarajim Masharhir al-Nisa’ (The beautiful woman's exhibition for the biographies of female celebrities), of Eastern and Western women. She dedicated it to Princess Cheshmat Hanim, third wife of Isma’il, who sponsored its personification. Hind's father and uncle worked as journalists and translators in the Egyptian government. Her father would end up directing the office of Hind's magazine where her sister, Sarah, would also assist.

== Al-Fatat ==
Nawfal started her journal, al-Fatat (Arabic: The Young Woman), on 20 November 1892, at a time when there were a growing number of newspapers and scientific journals in circulation and also an increase in female readership. However, al-Fatat was the “first of its kind under the Eastern sky,” Nawfal said, in that it was a journal written for, by, and about women. Nawfal had intended to “adorn its pages with pearls from the pens of women.”

In her first issue, she outlined her goals for the magazine, which included defending women's rights, expressing their views and drawing on their responsibility and duties. She subtitled the magazine “scientific, historical, literary, and humorous.” It would not however discuss politics and had “no aim in religious controversies.”

Nawfal was inspired by women's periodicals abroad which had existed almost a century and a half earlier than when she first published hers. The magazine covered issues such as marriage, divorce, veiling, seclusion, education, work, domestic instruction and entertainment. It had publications that contained biographies of Western women like Queen Victoria or interesting facts pertaining to women like there are 252 female medical students in France along with 121 novelists, 280 poets, and 425 essayists. The magazine encouraged debate by discussing topics like the different standards of beauty that exist among different countries.

Sometimes, Nawfal would ask questions for readers to write in and answer. In her February 1893 issue, for example, she asked the question, “whose labor is more strenuous, men or women?” Thus al-Fatat became a forum for discussion and debate over women's roles.

To urge women's participation in al-Fatat, Nawfal emphasized that a woman who wrote in journals was “not compromising her modesty or violating her purity and good behavior.” Additionally Nawfal made an effort to acknowledge indigenous women of ages where women had been role models in society. She referenced Semiramis, an Assyrian queen, Bilquis, queen of Sheba, along with the women of the Pharaonic times, who for a “period of two thousand years showed extreme gentleness and refinement and demonstrated achievements and perfection which women of the West have not yet reached.” She did, however, discuss American and European female writers by saying that their writing had not compromised their societal status and, on the contrary, had earned them respect.

== Legacy ==
Nawfal married Habib Dabbana in August 1893 who was a Syrian who worked in the legal section of the Ministry of Finance and stopped her journal to return to life of domesticity and philanthropy in 1894. Though al-Fatah only lasted two years, it was the first of the genre of Arab Feminist known as al-majallat al-nisa'iyya written by women, which reached almost 30 and coincided with the Egyptian Revolution of 1919. According to Nabila Ramdani, "al-Fatah is viewed as the first wholly feminist publication in a sizeable list of Arabic periodicals." Beth Baron states that, "The Arabic women's journals present us with a unique historical source and give us an opportunity to recover the voices of women so that we can balance other accounts of their lives with their own descriptions. Collectively the journals are one of the earliest troves of materials of this sort, for this was the first generation of women in the Arab world to write in numbers and to produce and publish their works as printed texts."
