= Salma Sayegh =

Lebanese novelist (1889–1953)

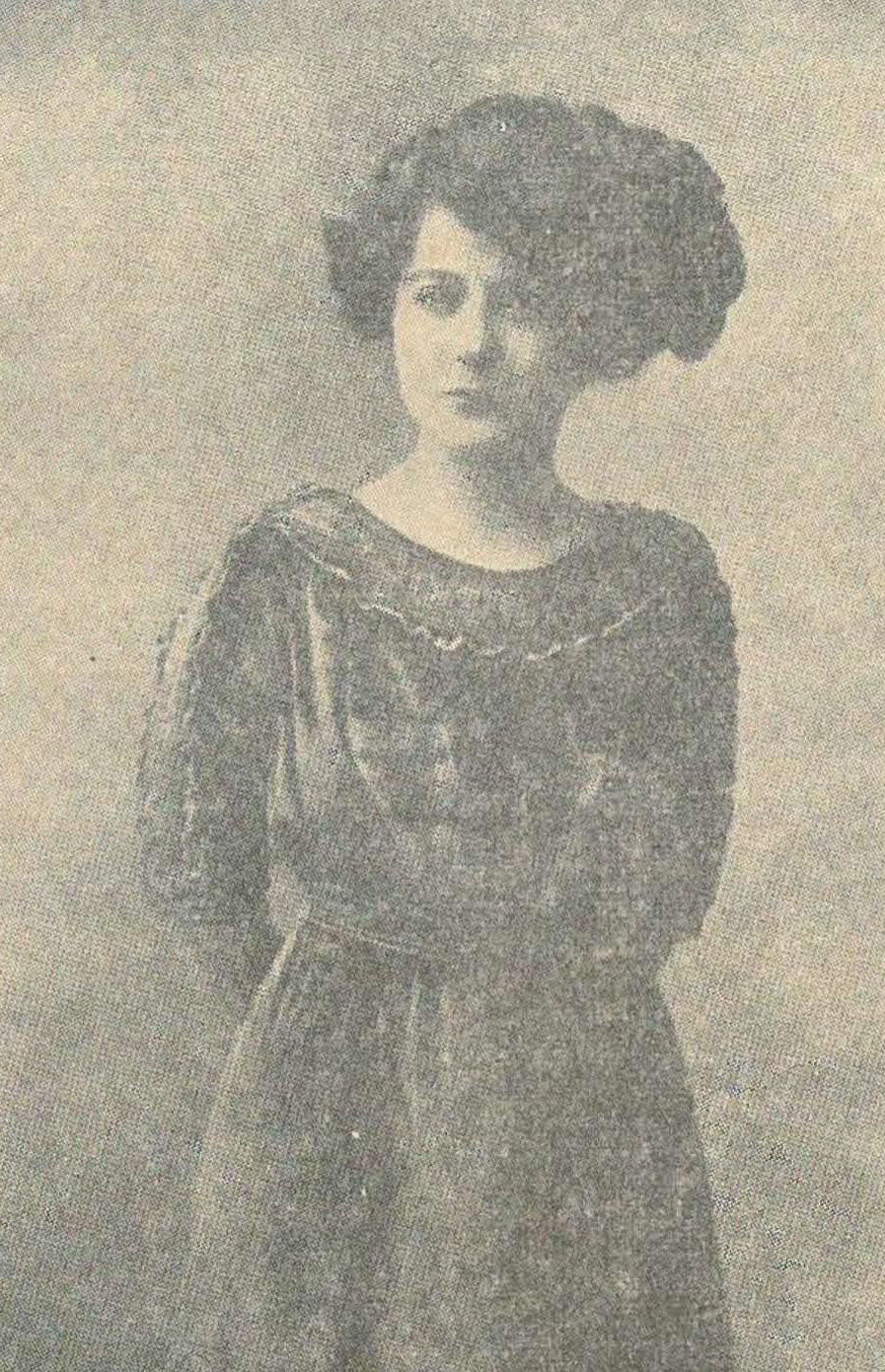
- Photograph of Sayegh
- Born: December 3, 1889; Beirut, Lebanon
- Died: September 27, 1953 (aged 63); Beirut, Lebanon
- Occupation: Writer • Teacher
- Spouse: Farid Kassab
- Children: Aida • Georges

Salma Sayegh (December 3, 1889 – September 27, 1953) was a Lebanese writer, novelist, and feminist of the Nahda era. She, along with other female contemporaries, helped in founding the Society for Women's Renaissance. She wrote for several journals, newspapers, and magazines such as Sawt al-Mar’a (The Women’s Voice) and published many novels. She also played part in Lebanon's cultural salon movement as she hosted one at her home in Beirut in the early 1950s.

== Biography ==
Salma Sayegh was born on December 3, 1889, in Beirut, Lebanon. Her parents were originally from Wadi al-Taym and had moved to Beirut in 1860. She attended a school named Zahrat Al Ihsan, where she was inspired by her Arabic language teacher Al Sheikh Ibrahim Al Monzer. Later on, she spent a large part of her life teaching Arabic. She taught in a high school (الكلية العلمية للبنات) where she volunteered to give lessons in prose composition. Her public speeches caught the attention of the literary circles of her day.`

Sayegh entered the field of journalism at the age of eighteen under the name Salwa Mouawen, and started by writing articles against the Ottomans and Mandate agents. Sayegh also attended a French university and unsuccessfully attempted to study dentistry.

During World War I, Sayegh, together with Henri Misk, took over a hospice in Ghazir that had originally been built by the Ottoman politician Djemal Pasha.

Sayegh traveled to many countries during her life. She visited Egypt, Turkey, France, England and eventually moved to Brazil in search of her brother, and remained there for eight years until the start of the World War II. During this time, she became a member of the Andalusian League, a Lebanese literary circle in São Paulo that supported the spread of Arabic literature. Having learnt Portuguese, she translated several literary books into Arabic.

After her return to Lebanon, she founded the Society For Women's Renaissance and ran the orthodox charitable schools in Beirut for five years. Sayegh died on September 27, 1953.

=== Personal life ===
In 1911, Sayegh married Farid Kassab with whom she had two children. Her daughter Aida married the Lebanese poet Salah Labaki while her son Georges died in infancy. Her marriage didn't last long, and the couple split after the death of their son.

=== Society For Women's Renaissance ===
In 1924, Sayegh was in the process of forming a society composed of women from Beirut called the Society for Women's Renaissance to lobby for gender equality; to sign, spread, and submit petitions; and to promote Lebanon's local economy by encouraging Syrian and Lebanese products. Its presidency was assigned to Labiba Thabit, and among the founding members were Khartum and Ibtihaj Qaddura, Najla Kfoury, Hunayneh Tarsha, Baida, Shuqayr, and Anbara Salam Khalidi.

They would meet once a week, hosting the meeting in turns. They began by visiting shops that stocked national products, then sent delegations to Syrian factories to encourage them and to suggest ways for improvement and quality control, calling for greater artistry and taste in design and color. They soon organized exhibitions for Lebanese products and attempted to turn native textiles into modern fashions, which they would wear during meetings.

== Philosophical and political views ==
In her early career, Sayegh published literature critical of the Ottoman Empire under the pen name Salwa Mouawen. She also advocated for educational reform after Lebanon's independence.

Sayegh's writings supported the Palestinian cause in the build-up to the Palestinian Catastrophe in 1948. Having described Palestine as the “Southern Syria”, she continued to do so after the event. She advocated for equal wages to ensure a better living for all Lebanese.

== Published works ==
In her work, Sayegh covered issues of social justice.

She wrote for many magazines, such as Al Hasna', Al Fajr, and Sawt al-Mar’a (The Women's Voice), and authored several novels. Her published works include:

- Al Nasamat (The Breeze) 1923
- Suwar w Thekrayat (Pictures and Memories) 1964
- Mouthakarat Sharkiya (Oriental Notes)

She also published "Ba'ad Nawahi al-Khayr fi Lubnan" (Some Aspects of Humanism in Lebanon) and "A'amal al-Rahma" (Acts of Mercy) in both Arabic and French, in 1949.

Additionally, she translated from French the novel "The Girl of the Persians" and published it in a magazine named New Woman.

Sayegh says in one of her articles:

“To the mountain of the Lord, O ye that are tired and heavy laden!

To the woods which echoed the kisses of the Salomon.

To the white summits where Jesus’ holiness was revealed.

Away from the city and its turbulence, I fled to the hilltops of Harissa where stands the mother of the Nazarene with open arms, as if repeating the call of her son: come to me, all ye that are tired and I shall give you rest.”

According to Rose Ghurayib, Sayegh’s writings were deeply emotional, “conscious of human suffering, strongly moved by the sight of misery”, and critical of children and women abuse and all sorts of social injustices.

== See also ==
- Salah Labaki
