= Al-Fatat (periodical) =

Egyptian women's magazine (1892–1894)

- Categories: Women's magazine
- Frequency: Monthly
- Founder: Hind Nawfal
- First issue: 30 November 1892
- Final issue: 1894
- Country: Egypt
- Based in: Alexandria
- Language: Arabic

Al-Fatat (Arabic: الفتاة / ALA-LC: Al-Fatāh, lit. 'The Young Girl') was a women's magazine published in Alexandria, Egypt. The magazine was the first Arab women's magazine and was one of the earliest publications in the country. It was published from 1892 to 1894. Al-Fatat is the forerunner of the women's magazines in the Arab countries.

== History and profile ==
Al-Fatat was launched by Hind Nawfal, a Lebanese Christian woman, in Alexandria in 1892. Nawfal's father and sister also contributed to the establishment of the magazine of which the first issue appeared on 30 November 1892. Elisabeth Kendall stated that Nawfal's magazine had achieved a "fiery fusion of the political and literary".

Al-Fatat was published by Nawfal for two years. She also wrote editorials for the magazine, which was published monthly in its initial stage. Later Al-Fatat began to be published twice a month due to its growing popularity.

Being the first women's magazine in the country as well as in the other Arab countries, Al-Fatat initiated the tradition of the women's press in Egypt. One of the major contributors was Esther Moyal, a Beirut-born Jewish journalist. The magazine covered biographies of notable figures in addition to news concerning women. It also included book reviews, poems and fashion articles. Al-Fatat encouraged the participation of women in public life and debates and advocated modern ideals for women. Therefore, it provided secular content and was a truly feminist magazine. On the other hand, politics and religion were not the focus of the magazine.

Al-Fatat ceased publication in 1894 when the founder and publisher Nawfal married and stopped dealing with the magazine. The complete archive of the magazine was republished by the Women and Memory Forum in Egypt.

== See also ==
- List of magazines in Egypt
