= Mexico–European Union relations =

- European Union: Mexico

Mexico and the European Economic Community (EEC) signed an agreement intending to foster economic and trade relations on 15 July 1975. Mexico and the European Union (EU) have had a free trade agreement since 2000 and the two benefit from high investment flows.

== Agreements ==
In 1997, Mexico was the first country in Latin America to sign a partnership agreement with the EU. The "EU-Mexico Economic Partnership, Political Coordination and Cooperation Agreement" entered into force in 2000 and established a free trade area (FTA) between the two parties (see trade section below). It also establishes regular high-level contact between the EU and Mexico and acted as a catalyst for increased investment flows.

Mexico and the EU reached a new agreement in principle on trade in April 2018, which will replace the first agreement once is ratified by all EU members and the Mexican Senate. The new agreement will cover all goods, including the agricultural sector. It will be the first EU trade agreement to include an anti-corruption chapter for both, the private and the public sectors.

On 28 April 2020, the EU and Mexico concluded the last outstanding element of the negotiation of their new trade agreement and agreed on the exact scope of the reciprocal opening of public procurement markets and a high level of predictability and transparency in public procurement processes. With this, the EU and Mexico can advance to the signature and ratification of this agreement in line with their respective rules and procedures.

== Trade ==
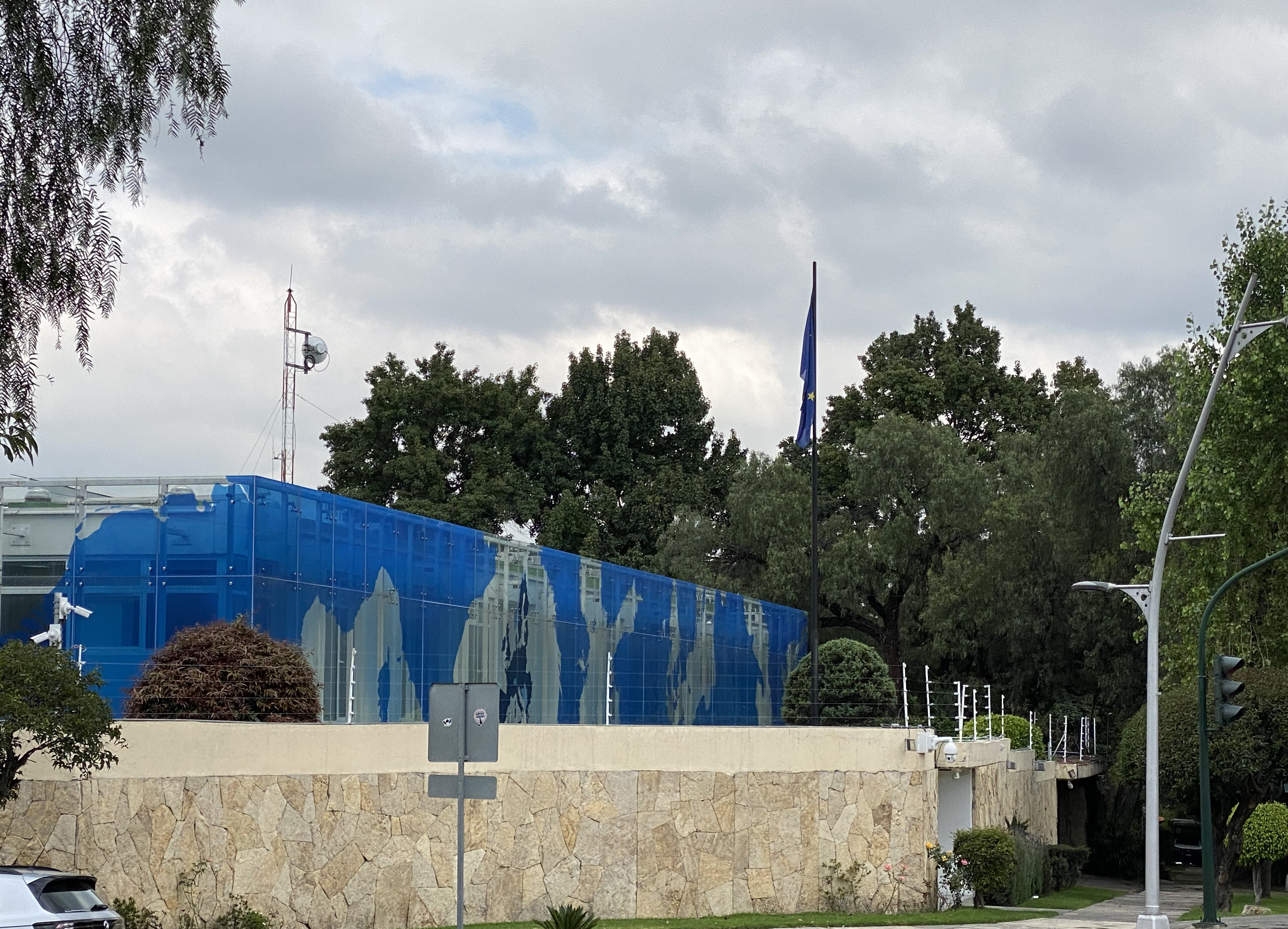
Delegation of the European Union in Mexico City

The EU is Mexico's third largest export market after the United States and China, as of 2024, and Mexico is the EU's 12th export partner. Mexico's main exports to the EU are "machinery and appliances, mineral products, chemical products, transport equipment, and base minerals." EU exports to Mexico consist of "machinery and appliances, chemical products, transport equipment, base metals, and mineral products." In terms of services, Mexico exports travel and transport services. The EU exports travel and transport and computer services.

The two have a broad and comprehensive FTA which entered into force in October 2000. It covers goods, services, public procurement, competition, intellectual property and investment. Bilateral investment flows are significant. A joint committee and special committees meet once a year and a joint council meets biannually.

EU – Mexican trade in 2023–2024
Direction of trade	Goods	Services	Investment stocks
EU to Mexico	€53.2 billion	€17.2 billion	€209 billion
Mexico to EU	€29.2 billion	€8.5 billion	€27 billion

== Mexico's foreign relations with EU member states ==
- Austria
- Belgium
- Bulgaria
- Croatia
- Cyprus
- Czech Republic
- Denmark
- Estonia
- Finland
- France
- Germany
- Greece
- Hungary
- (Republic of Ireland) Ireland
- Italy
- Latvia
- Lithuania
- Luxembourg
- Malta
- Netherlands
- Poland
- Portugal
- Romania
- Slovakia
- Slovenia
- Spain
- Sweden

== See also ==
- Foreign relations of the European Union
- Foreign relations of Mexico
