= Sjölander =

Sjölander is a surname. Notable people with the surname include:

- Jonas Sjölander (born 1965), Swedish curler
- Therese Sjölander (born 1981), Swedish ice hockey player
- Waldemar Sjölander (1908–1988), Swedish painter

== See also ==
- 8683 Sjölander, a main belt asteroid
- Lisbeth Sjölander, fictional character in the Millennium series.
