= Scandinavian Mexicans =

Scandinavian Mexicans escandinavo-mexicanos
Languages
- predominantly Mexican Spanish

Religion
- Christianity (mainly Protestantism)

Related ethnic groups
- other Scandinavian diaspora

Scandinavian Mexicans are citizens of Mexico of full or partial Scandinavian ancestry. The Scandinavian countries (Denmark, Norway and Sweden) have an intertwined history and shared cultural traits.

== History ==
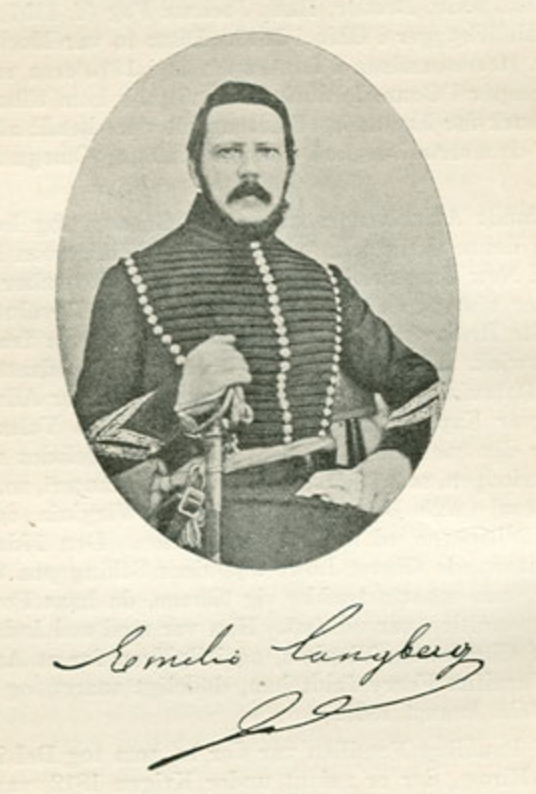
Emilio Langberg, born in Copenhagen, immigrated to Mexico in 1835 and rose through the ranks of the Mexican military, playing a notable role in its 19th century conflicts.

The first notable Dane and Scandinavian in what would become Mexico was Fray Jacobo Daciano, a younger brother of Christian II of Denmark, who settled in Michoacán in the mid-16th century, evangelized the region and became known for his love of the native Tarascans. In 1841 while studying the plants of southern Mexico, Danish scientist Federico Miguel Liebman came across a small group of natives in Oaxaca that spoke an archaic form of Danish. Through interviews with the oldest members of the community, Liebman came to conclude that these individuals were the descendants of Danish pirates that had been abandoned by their crew in the late 16th century and had entered into unions with native women. Swedes have been present in Mexico since at least the 1890s. The National Archival Services of Norway has records of individual Norwegians in Mexico in the late 19th and early 20th centuries.

During his voyage on the Norway-Mexico Gulf Line beginning in 1907, writer Peter Lykke-Seest spoke positevly of a "colony" of Norwegian businessmen in Veracruz; they were well-dressed, educated "gentlemen and ladies" that retained Norwegian customs. This stands in contrast to Lykke-Seest's negative feelings for "naive" farmers in a project founded by Otto Sverdrup in Cuba. He makes no mention of more humble Norwegians, like sailors, that would have been present in the port city. Lykke-Seest wrote positively of Mexico's resources and the economic stability provided by Porfirio Diaz's government and urged Norwegians to venture in the country before they were crowded out. He also mentioned the prospect of establishing modern (rationale) farming colonies- his view on these colonies may have been influenced by the Porfirian government. Correspondences between shipowner Gottfred M. Bryde and officials in Mexico, including Michael Strøm Lie, suggest the Norway-Mexico Gulf Line planned to ship Norwegian farmers. After five years of negotiations, a contract was drawn up by the government and the Norway-Mexico Gulf Line in 1912 for the shipping of "colonists" and wooden houses, but due to the outbreak of the Mexican Revolution, was never signed. As a result of the war, Norwegian presence more than halved between 1910 and 1921. Only three to six hundred Norwegians moved to Mexico before 1940.

According to the National Institute of Migration, in 2009 there were 633 Sweden-born residents in Mexico. In the same year there were 404 Denmark-born residents and 240 Norway-born residents. The majority of these individuals lived in the Mexico City Metropolitan Area.

== Notable individuals ==
Swedish

- Axel Didriksson- writer and professor at UNAM
- Rosa Lie Johansson- painter
- Víctor Lojero Alexanderson- footballer
- Anne Marie Thistler- former Miss Sweden
- Yolanda "Tongolele" Montes- exotic dancer
- Aline Pettersson - writer
- Julieta Rosen- actress
- Ximena Sariñana- singer
- Nena von Schlebrügge- model
- Waldemar Sjölander- artist
- Christopher von Uckermann- singer

Danish

- Frans Blom- archeologist
- Sairi Forsman- sculptor
- Rosario María Gutiérrez Eskildsen- lexicographer, linguist, educator
- Ann Margarit Henningsen- sprint canoer
- Cynthia Klitbo- actress
- Edvard Emile Langberg - general
- Miguel Ostersen- footballer
- Greer Skousen- basketball player

Norwegian

- Ola Apenes- archeologist
- Eva Norvind- writer and actress
- Nailea Norvind- actress
- Mario Schjetnan- architect

== See also ==
- Immigration to Mexico
- Denmark–Mexico relations
- Mexico–Norway relations
- Mexico–Sweden relations
