= Finland–Mexico relations =

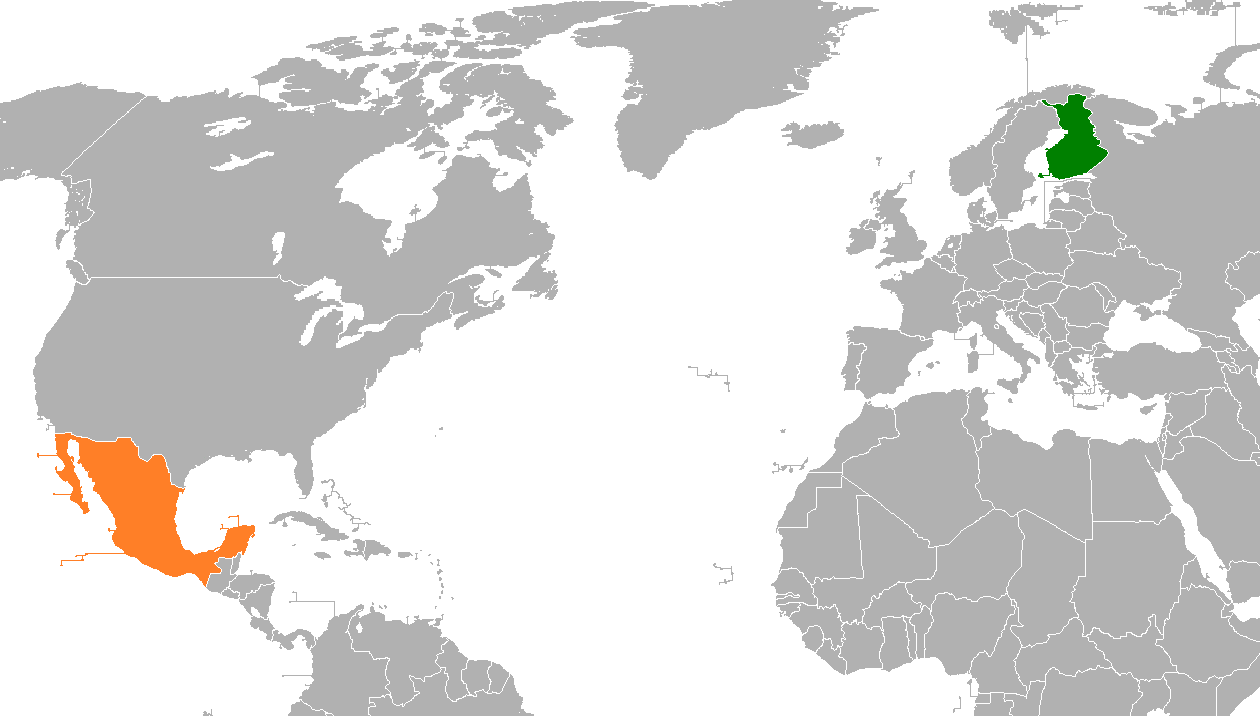

- Finland: Mexico

The nations of Finland and Mexico established diplomatic relations in 1936. Both nations are members of the Organisation for Economic Co-operation and Development and the United Nations.

== History ==
On 13 July 1920, Mexico recognized the independence of Finland from Russia. On 2 October 1936, Finland and Mexico signed a Treaty of Friendship in Washington, D.C., United States which officially established diplomatic relations between both nations. In December 1939, during the Winter War, Mexican President Lázaro Cárdenas sent a message of solidarity to the Finnish people.

In 1949, a few years after the end of World War II, Finland and Mexico formally accredited ambassadors to each other. The first Mexican embassy accredited to Finland was based in Stockholm, Sweden with Gilberto Bosques Saldívar becoming the first Mexican Ambassador accredited to Finland. The first Finnish embassy accredited to Mexico was based in Washington, D.C. In 1964, resident embassies were established in each other's respective capitals.

In February 1999, Finnish President Martti Ahtisaari paid a visit to Mexico and met with President Ernesto Zedillo. In February 2015, Mexican Foreign Secretary José Antonio Meade paid a visit to Finland. In October 2016, Finnish Prime Minister Juha Sipilä paid an official visit to Mexico and met with Mexican President Enrique Peña Nieto. During the meeting, the leaders highlighted the excellent state of bilateral political dialogue and the importance of President Sauli Niinistö's state visit to Mexico in May 2015; which gave a renewed impetus to the ties between Mexico and Finland.

In 2026, both nations celebrated 90 years of diplomatic relations.

== High-level visits ==
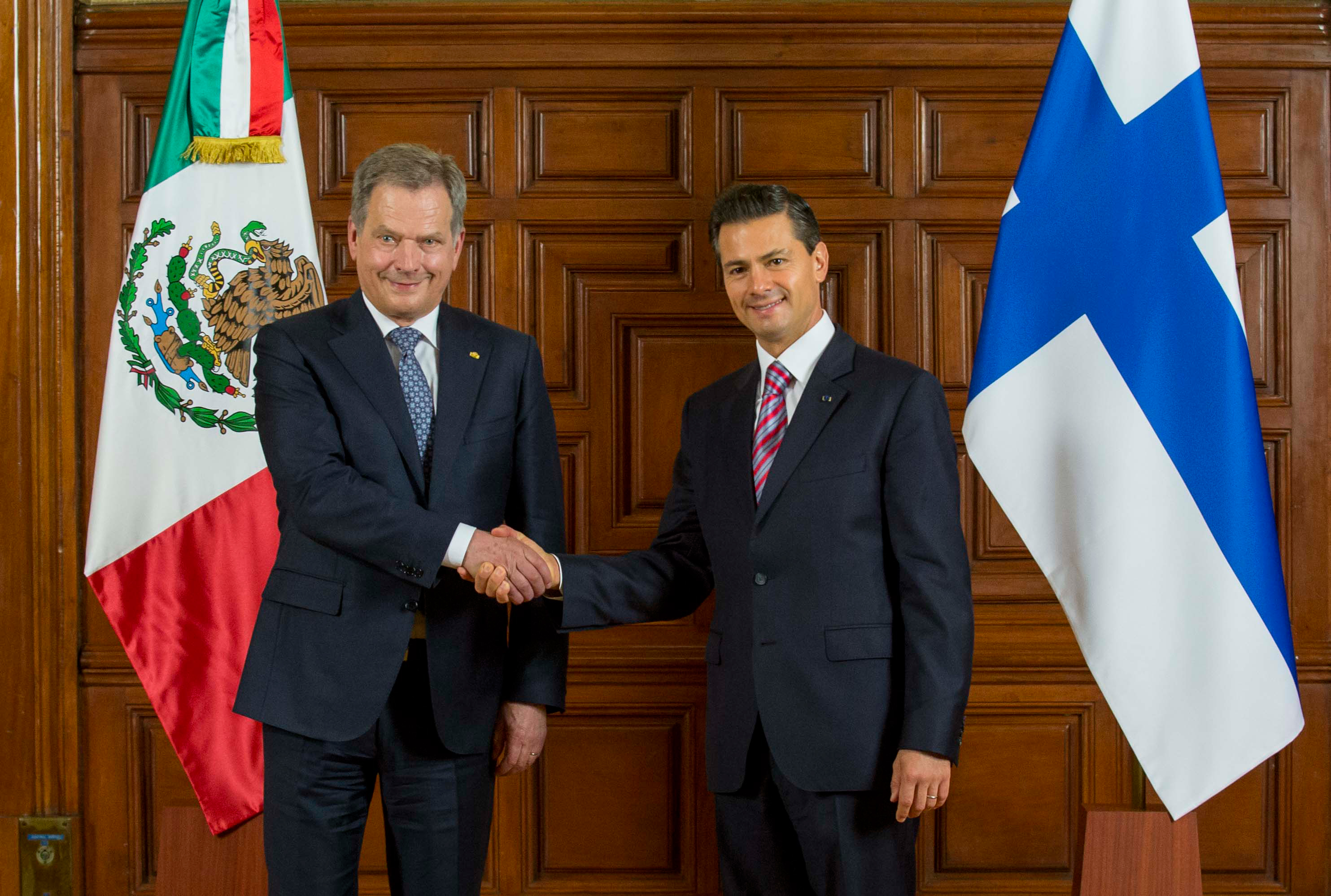
Finnish President Sauli Niinistö on a visit to Mexico City, along with Mexican President Enrique Peña Nieto; May 2015.

High-level visits from Finland to Mexico

- President Martti Ahtisaari (February 1999)
- President Tarja Halonen (March 2002)
- Minister for European Affairs and Trade Alexander Stubb (May 2013)
- President Sauli Niinistö (May 2015)
- Secretary of State for the Ministry of Foreign Affairs Peter Stenlund (June 2016)
- Prime Minister Juha Sipilä (October 2016)

High-level visits from Mexico to Finland

- Foreign Undersecretary Carlos de Icaza (April 2014)
- Foreign Secretary José Antonio Meade (February 2015)
- Director General for Europe Bernardo Aguilar Calvo (2021)

== Bilateral agreements ==
Both nations have signed several bilateral agreements such as a Treaty for Friendship (1936); Agreement on Economic, Scientific and Technical Cooperation (1975); Agreement on Inter-cultural Exchanges (1982); Agreement to Avoid Double Taxation and Prevent Tax Evasion in Income Taxes (1997); Agreement on the Promotion and Reciprocal Protection of Investments (1999); Memorandum of Understanding on Cooperation in Forest Preservation (2011); Memorandum of Understanding in Water Management Cooperation (2011); Memorandum of Understanding between the Viikki Tropical Resources Institute (VITRI) of the University of Helsinki and the Mexican National Forestry Commission (CONAFOR) (2015); Memorandum of Understanding on Cooperation in Export Credit between Finnvera of Finland and Bancomext of Mexico (2015); Memorandum of Understanding between FINPRO and ProMéxico (2015) and an Agreement on Air Transportation (2019).

== Tourism and Transportation ==
In 2018, 13,450 Finnish citizens visited Mexico for touristic purposes.

== Trade ==
In 1997, Mexico signed a Free Trade Agreement with the European Union (which includes Finland). Since the implementation of the free trade agreement in 2000, trade between the two nations has increased dramatically. In 2023, two-way trade between Mexico and Finland was US$936 million. Finland's main exports to Mexico include: Machinery and transport equipment and manufactured products. Mexico's main exports to Finland include: Machinery and transport equipment; chemicals and related products; food and beverages. Finnish multinational companies such as Kone, Nokia and Vaisala (among others) operate in Mexico. Mexican multinational companies Cemex and Orbia operate in Finland.

== Resident diplomatic missions ==
- Finland has an embassy in Mexico City.
- Mexico has an embassy in Helsinki.
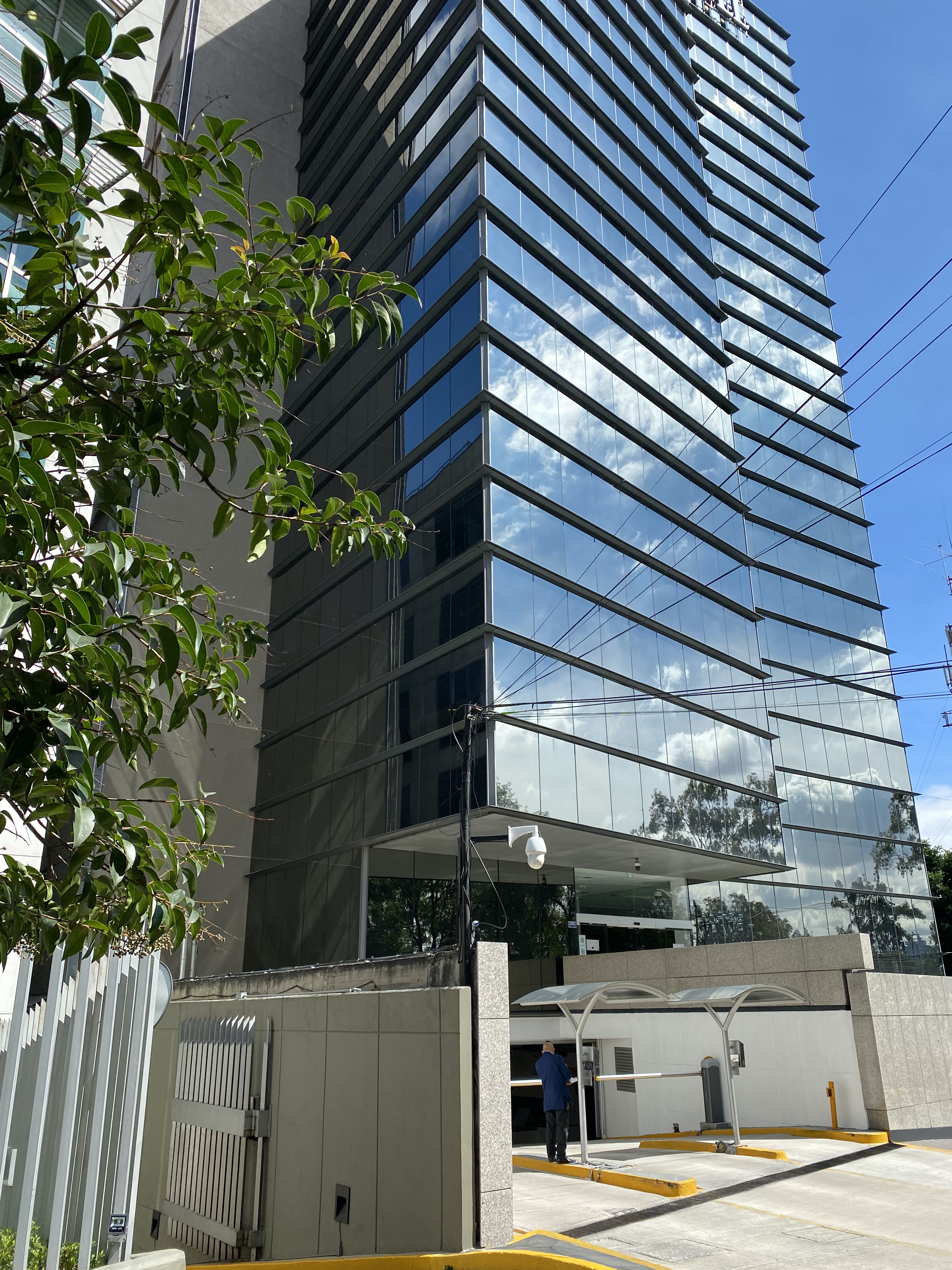
Building hosting the Embassy of Finland in Mexico City

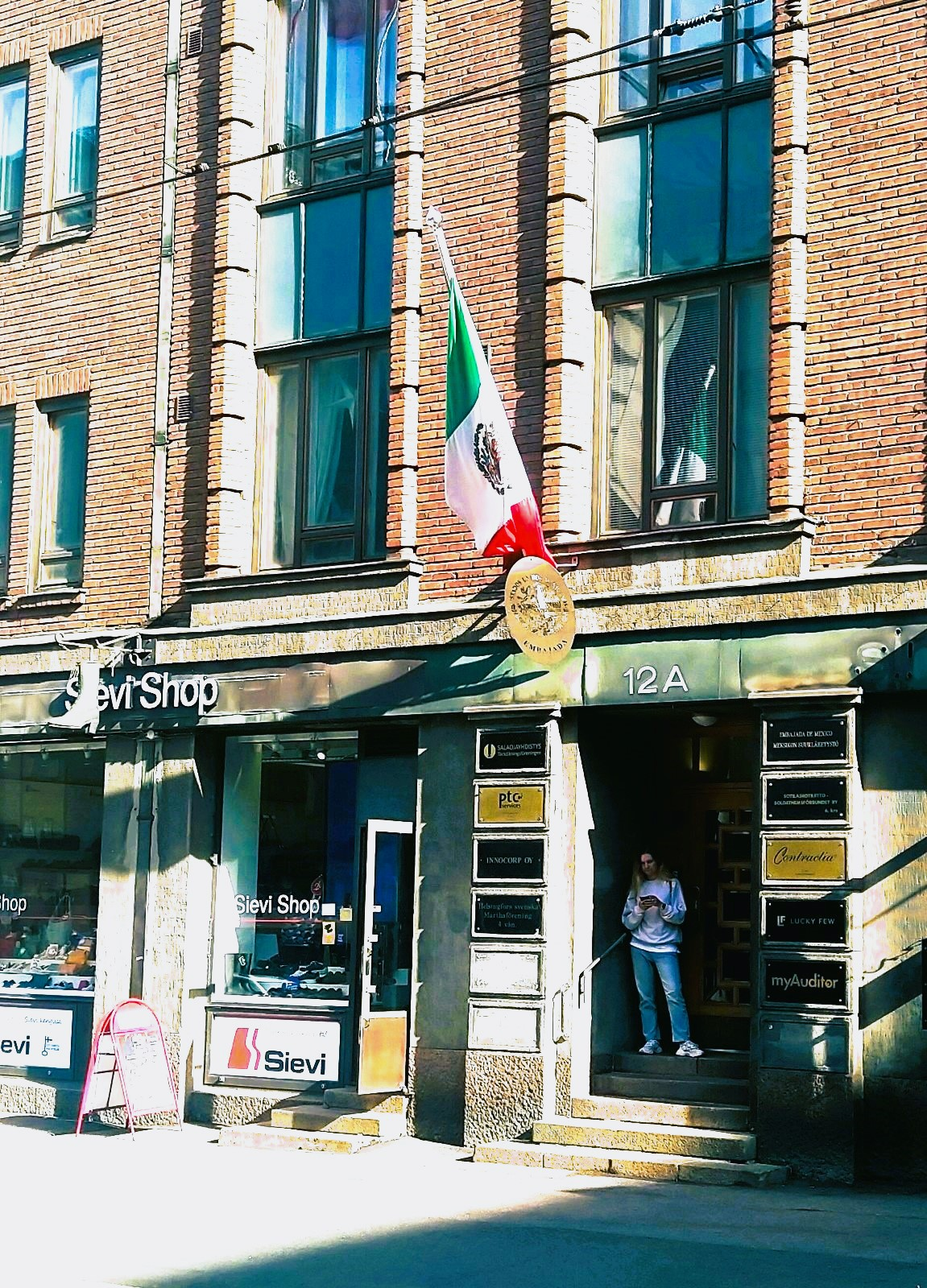
Embassy of Mexico in Helsinki

== Gallery ==
Mexican Navy sail training vessel, the ARM Cuauhtémoc, in Turku, Finland

Flags of Mexico and Finland at the National Palace in Mexico City

== See also ==
- Latin American migration to Finland
- Mexico–European Union relations
