= Mexico–Norway relations =

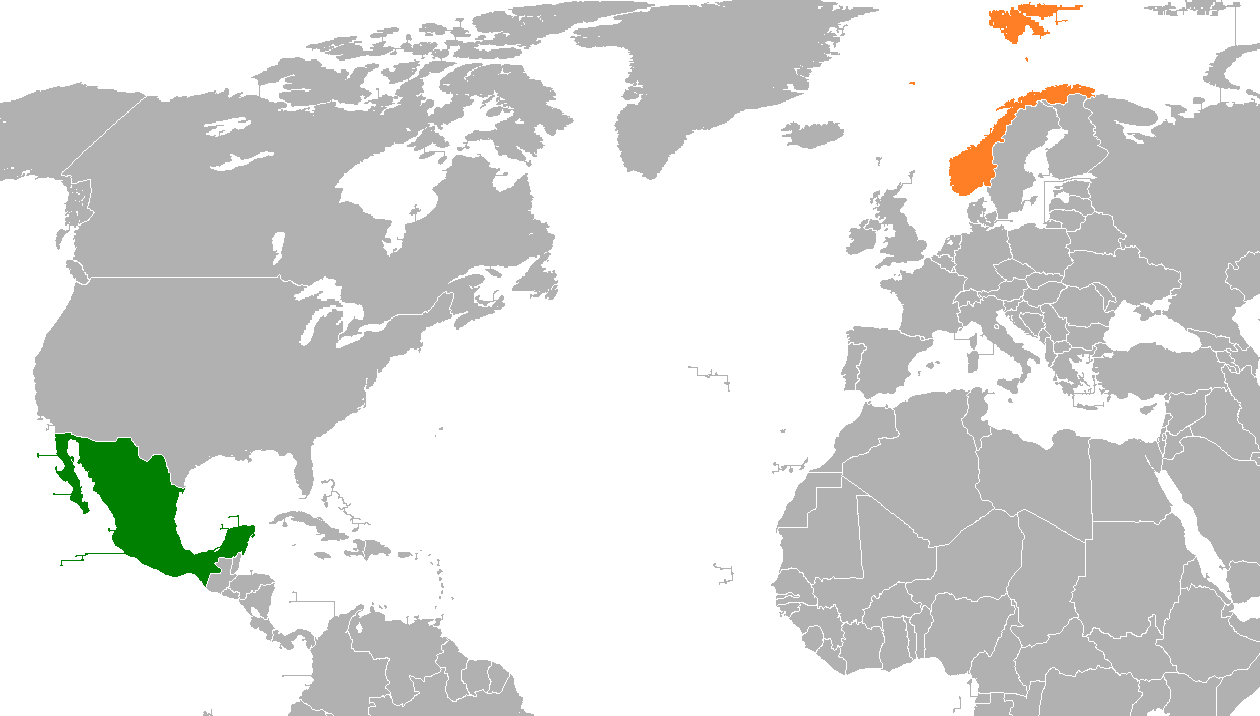

- Mexico: Norway

The nations of Mexico and Norway established diplomatic relations in 1906. Both nations are members of the Organisation for Economic Co-operation and Development and the United Nations.

== History ==
Norway recognized Mexico after the latter obtained its independence from Spain in 1821. At the time, Norway was part of the Union between Sweden and Norway. Mexico and the Union established diplomatic relations on 29 July 1885 with the signing of a Treaty of Friendship, Navigation and Commerce. The union disbanded in 1905 and Norway became an independent nation. On 5 April 1906, Mexico established diplomatic relations with Norway.

In 1910 Norway established an embassy in Mexico City and Mexico would established an embassy in Oslo a few years later. During World War II, Mexico maintained diplomatic relations with the Norwegian government in exile. After the war, both nations re-opened their embassies, respectively.

In 1968, Crown Prince (and future King) of Norway, Harald V paid an official visit to Mexico. Since the initial visit, there have been several high-level visits between both nations. In June 2002, Mexico closed its embassy in Oslo due to financial restraints. In March 2002, Norwegian Prime Minister Kjell Magne Bondevik attended the Monterrey Consensus in the Mexican city of Monterrey where he met with President Vicente Fox. The Mexican embassy in Oslo was re-opened in 2014.

In 2011, Mexican Foreign Secretary Patricia Espinosa paid a visit to Norway and in 2017, Mexican Foreign Secretary Luis Videgaray Caso also paid a visit to the country. In April 2018, Norwegian Prime Minister Erna Solberg paid a visit to Mexico and met with President Enrique Peña Nieto. While in Mexico, the two leaders discussed the joint work undertaken by their governments to strengthen political dialogue and identify new opportunities for collaboration in the energy and multilateral spheres.

In February 2023, Norwegian Foreign Minister Anniken Huitfeldt paid a visit to Mexico and met with her counterpart Marcelo Ebrard. In 2024, both nations celebrated 118 years of diplomatic relations.

== High-level visits ==
High-level visits from Mexico to Norway

- Foreign Secretary Patricia Espinosa (2011)
- Foreign Secretary Luis Videgaray Caso (2017)
- Foreign Undersecretary Carmen Moreno Toscano (2023)

High-level visits from Norway to Mexico

- Crown Prince (and current King) Harald (1968)
- Prime Minister Kjell Magne Bondevik (2002)
- Crown Prince Haakon (2009, 2012)
- Prime Minister Jens Stoltenberg (April and December 2010)
- Foreign Minister Børge Brende (2015)
- Prime Minister Erna Solberg (2018)
- State Secretary Jens Frølich Holte (2019)
- Foreign Minister Anniken Huitfeldt (2023)

== Bilateral agreements ==
Both nations have signed several bilateral agreements such as an Agreement on Cultural exchanges (1980); Agreement to Avoid Double Taxation and Prevent Tax Evasion in the Matter of Income and Property Taxes (1995); Agreement on Agriculture Cooperation (2000); and an Agreement on Fishing and Aquaculture Cooperation (2018).

== Transportation ==
There are direct flights between Cancún International Airport and Oslo Airport, Gardermoen with TUI fly Nordic.

== Trade ==
In 2001, Mexico signed a free trade agreement with the European Free Trade Association member nations (which includes Norway). In 2023, two-way trade between both nations amounted to US$407 million. Mexico's main exports to Norway include: tubes and pipes of iron or steel, nickel and aluminum based products, telephones and mobile phones, machinery, fiberglass, vehicles and parts, rubber tires, beer, alcohol, fruits and vegetables. Norway's main exports to Mexico include: chemical based products, unwrought nickel, ferroalloys, electrical equipment, machinery, seafood, parts and accessories of motor vehicles, and medical equipment. Mexican multinational companies such as Cemex and Orbia operate in Norway. Norwegian multinational company Norsk Hydro operates in Mexico.

== Resident diplomatic missions ==
- Mexico has an embassy in Oslo.
- Norway has an embassy in Mexico City.

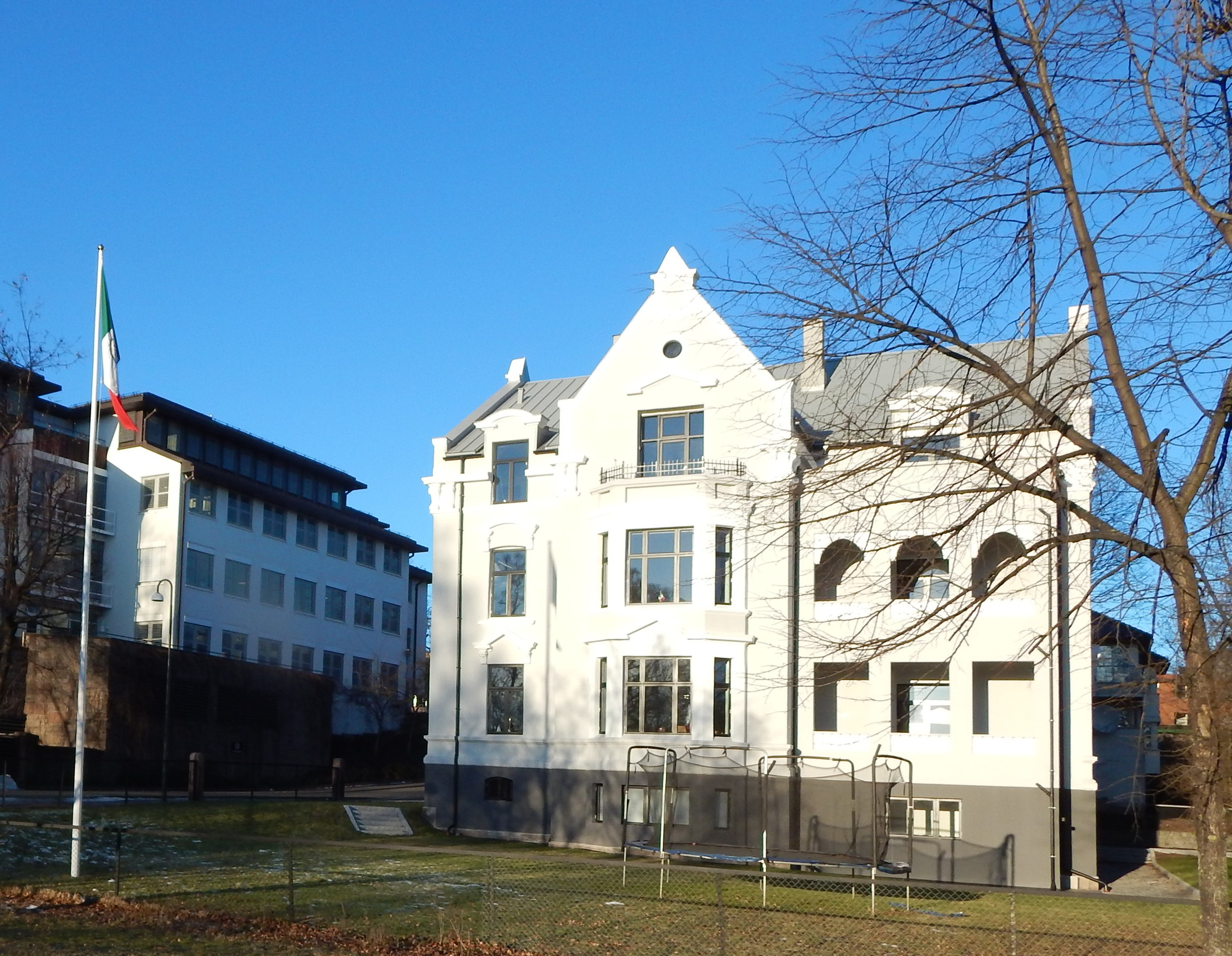
Embassy of Mexico in Oslo

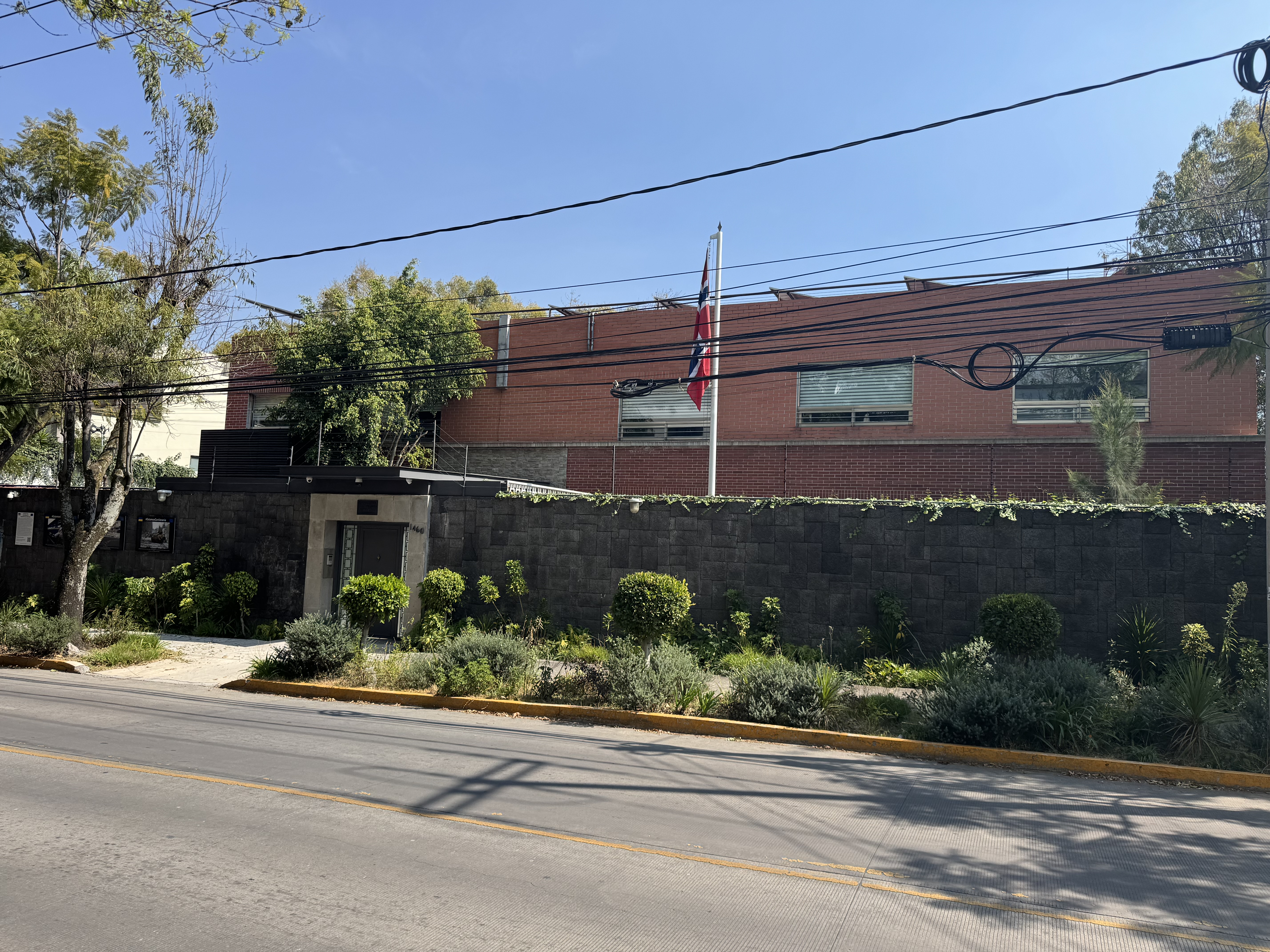
Embassy of Norway in Mexico City

== See also ==
- Scandinavian Mexicans
