= Mexico–Sweden relations =

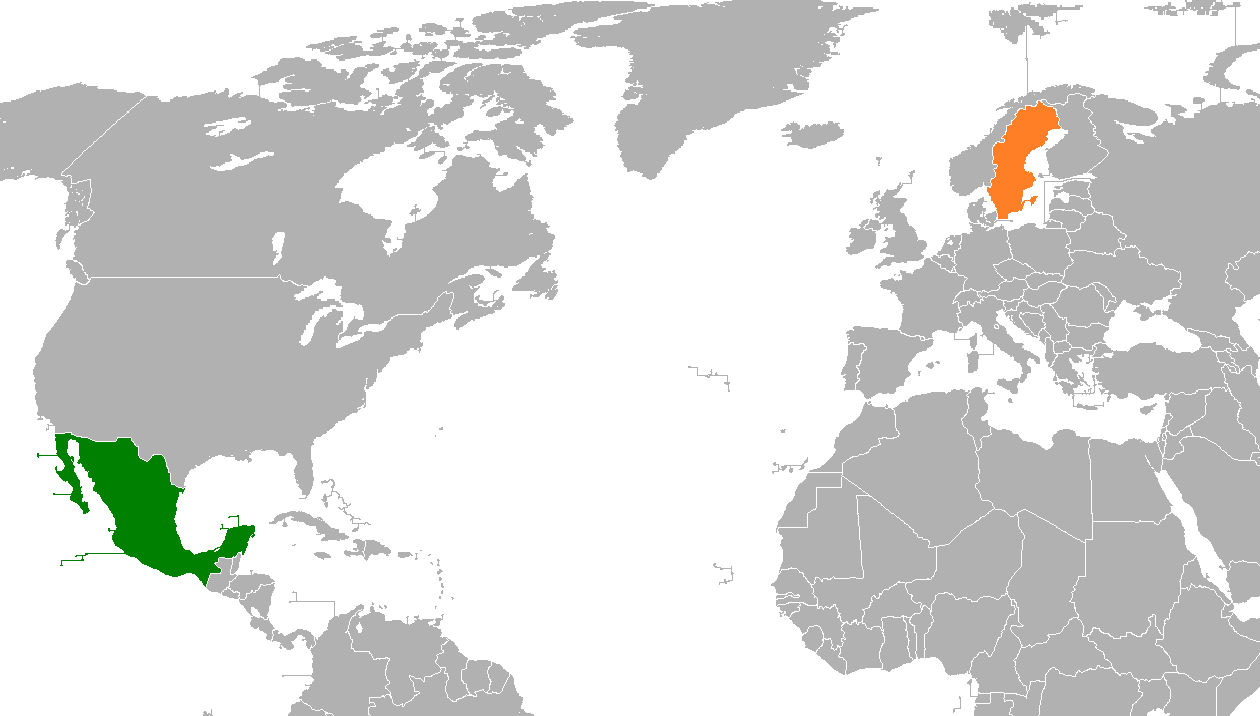

- Mexico: Sweden

The nations of Mexico and Sweden established diplomatic relations in 1885. Both members of the Organisation for Economic Co-operation and Development and the United Nations.

== History ==
Initial relations between Mexico and Sweden began in 1850 when a Swedish consulate was opened in Veracruz City. On 29 July 1885, the Treaty of Friendship, Commerce and Navigation was signed between the two nations. In 1913, Sweden opened a diplomatic mission in Mexico City. The legation was upgraded to an embassy in 1956.

In 1980, Mexican President José López Portillo paid an official visit to Sweden, becoming the first Mexican head-of-State to do so. In 1982, King Carl XVI Gustaf of Sweden and Queen Silvia of Sweden paid an official visit to Mexico. The monarchs would later pay a second state visit to Mexico in 2002. There have also been several high levels visits by Mexican presidents and Swedish prime ministers to each other's countries respectively.

In 1982, Alfonso García Robles of Mexico and Alva Myrdal of Sweden received a Nobel Peace Prize "[for] their magnificent work in the disarmament negotiations of the United Nations, where they have both played crucial roles and won international recognition". In 2013, Swedish Prime Minister Fredrik Reinfeldt paid an official visit to Mexico and met with Mexican President Enrique Peña Nieto. During the visit, both nations stressed the importance of the relations between both nations and signed several bilateral agreements.

In 2022, a 'Mexico-Sweden Friendship Group' was installed within the Mexican Chamber of Deputies in order to strengthen parliamentary ties and diplomacy between both nations. In 2023, both nations celebrated 138 years of diplomatic relations.

In March 2024, Swedish King Carl XVI Gustaf and Queen Silvia paid a three day visit to Mexico, by invitation from President Andrés Manuel López Obrador.

== High-level visits ==
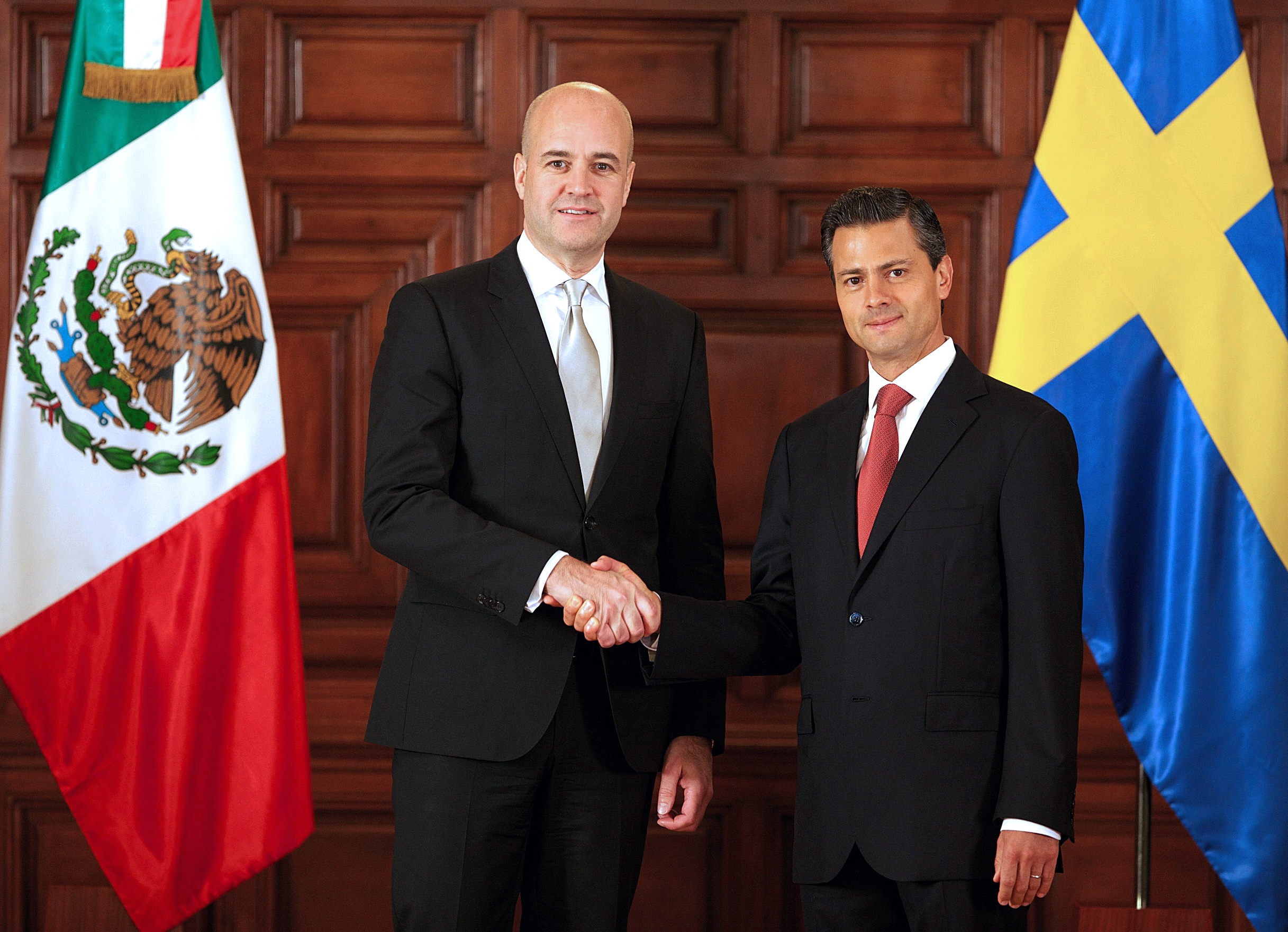
Swedish Prime Minister Fredrik Reinfeldt meeting with Mexican President Enrique Peña Nieto in Mexico City, 2013.

High-level visits from Mexico to Sweden

- President José López Portillo (1980)
- President Miguel de la Madrid (1988)
- President Carlos Salinas de Gortari (1993)
- President Vicente Fox (2003)

High-level visits from Sweden to Mexico

- Prime Minister Thorbjörn Fälldin (1981)
- King Carl Gustaf XVI (1982, 2002, 2024)
- Prime Minister Olof Palme (1984)
- Prime Minister Ingvar Carlsson (1986)
- Prime Minister Fredrik Reinfeldt (2013)

== Bilateral agreements ==
Over the years, both nations have signed several bilateral agreements such as a Treaty of Friendship, Commerce and Navigation (1885); Agreement on the elimination of visas for ordinary passport holders (1954); Agreement on Scientific and Technical Cooperation (1980); Agreement to avoid double taxation and prevent tax evasion in income taxes and its protocol (1992); Agreement to establish Joint Meeting's to discuss Common Interests (1998); Agreement on the reciprocal Promotion and Protection of Investments (2000); Agreement on Credit and Export Cooperation (2013) and an Agreement on Mining Cooperation (2013).

== Transportation ==
There are direct flights between Cancún and Stockholm with TUI Airways.

== Trade ==
In 1997, Mexico signed a Free Trade Agreement with the European Union (which includes Sweden). Since then, trade between the two nations have increased dramatically. In 2023, trade between Mexico and Sweden totaled $1.4 billion (USD). Mexico's main exports to Sweden include: data processing machines, manufactured goods, minerals, coffee and alcohol. Sweden's main exports to Mexico include: mainly manufactured products, automobiles and pharmaceuticals. There are over 200 Swedish companies operating in Mexico today, among them are: AstraZeneca, Ericsson, SKF, Svenska Cellulosa AB and Volvo.

== Resident diplomatic missions ==
- Mexico has an embassy in Stockholm.
- Sweden has an embassy in Mexico City.

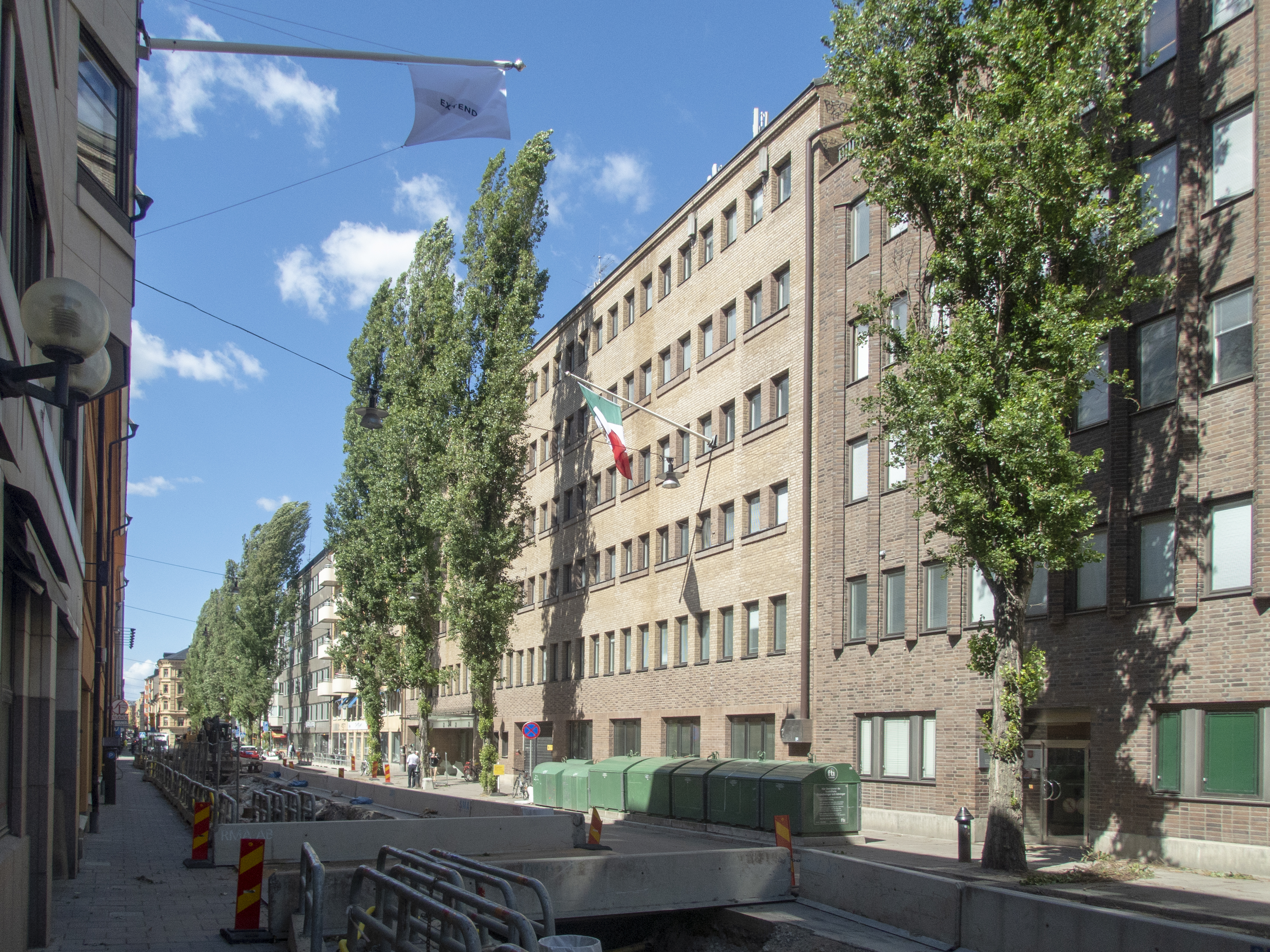
Embassy of Mexico in Stockholm

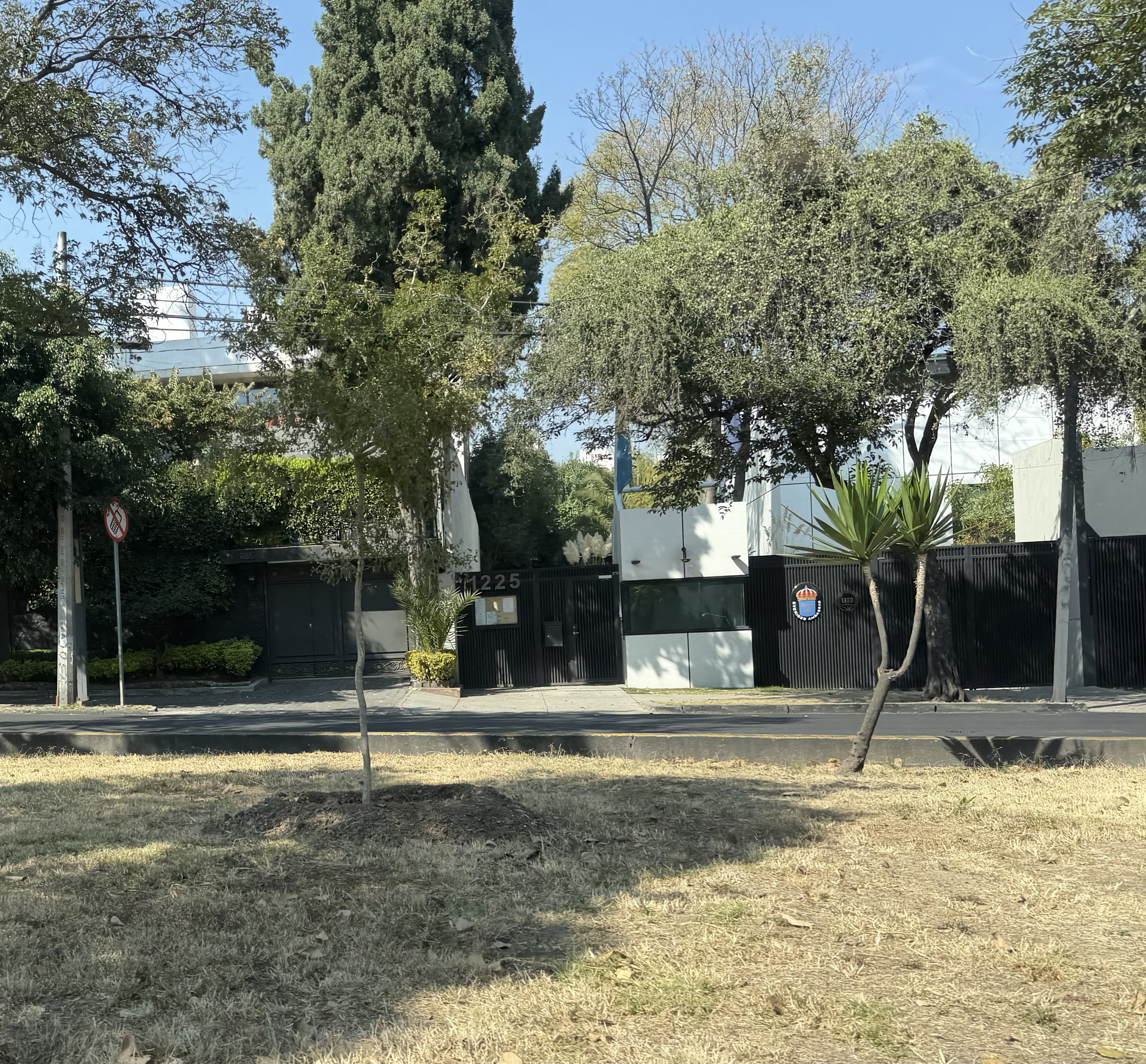
Embassy of Sweden in Mexico City

== See also ==
- Embassy of Sweden, Mexico City
- Scandinavian Mexicans
- Mexico–EU relations
