= Lithuania–Mexico relations =

Bilateral relations between Lithuania and Mexico

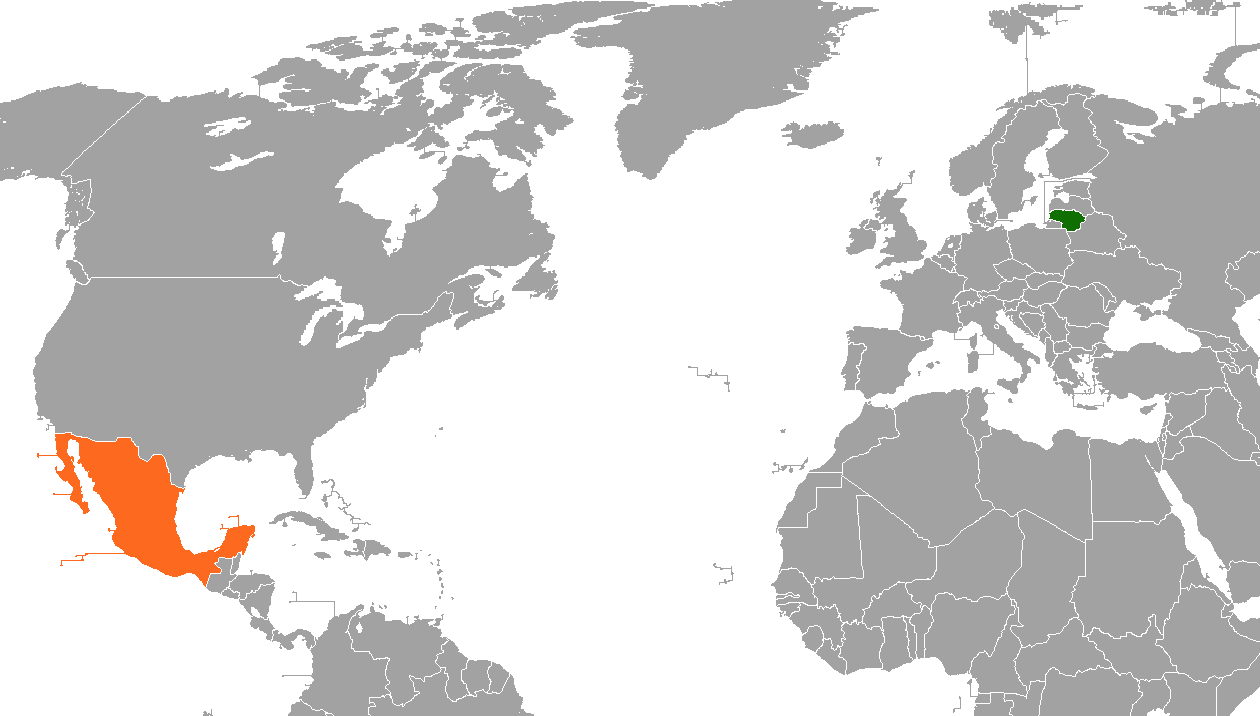

- Lithuania: Mexico

The nations of Lithuania and Mexico initially established diplomatic relations in 1938, however, diplomatic relations were interrupted with Lithuania's annexation by the Soviet Union. In 1991, both nations re-established diplomatic relations.

Both nations are members of the Organisation for Economic Co-operation and Development and the United Nations.

== History ==
Lithuanian President Dalia Grybauskaitė and Mexican President Enrique Peña Nieto attending the Nuclear Security Summit in Washington, D.C.; 2016.

Early contact between Lithuania and Mexico occurred with the immigration of over 700 primarily Lithuanian Jews to Mexico between 1900 and 1950. As a result, the Justo Sierra Synagogue 71 in Mexico City was created to replicate the destroyed Shavel Synagogue in Šiauliai, Lithuania.

In 1918, Lithuania obtained its independence after World War I and after 123 years as part of the Russian Empire. On 5 May 1921, Mexico recognized Lithuania's independence. Both nations established diplomatic relations on 31 May 1938 in Washington, D.C. after the signing of a Treaty of Friendship. During World War II, Lithuania was occupied by both Nazi Germany and the Soviet Union and after the war, Lithuania was forcibly annexed by the Soviet Union in 1944. Mexico was one of the few nations to condemned and not recognize Soviet annexation of Lithuania.

In March 1990, Lithuania obtained its independence after the Dissolution of the Soviet Union. Mexico recognized the independence of and re-established diplomatic relations with Lithuania on 5 November 1991. Since then, Mexico has been accredited to Lithuania from its embassy in Stockholm, Sweden and Lithuania has been accredited to Mexico from its embassy in Washington, D.C., United States.

In January 2002, President Valdas Adamkus became the first Lithuanian head-of-state to pay an official visit to Mexico and was accompanied by Foreign Minister Antanas Valionis. During President Adamkus' visit, he met with Mexican President Vicente Fox. The purpose of the visit was to promote political dialogue and cooperation at the highest level. In June 2002, the first meeting of Lithuanian-Mexican bilateral political consultation was held in Vilnius, co-chaired by the Lithuanian Secretary of State of the Ministry of Foreign Affairs, Evaldas Ignatavičius, and Mexican Undersecretary of Foreign Affairs, Miguel Marín. In February 2003, Mexico opened an honorary consulate in Vilnius. In 2004, Lithuanian President Arturas Paulauskas traveled to Guadalajara, Mexico to attend the 3rd European Union, Latin America and the Caribbean Summit. In 2008, President Adamkus returned on a second visit to Mexico and met with Mexican President Felipe Calderón.

In 2009, Mexican Foreign Minister Patricia Espinosa Cantellano and Lithuanian Foreign Minister Vygaudas Ušackas met during the 119th Session of the Committee of Ministers of the Council of Europe held in Madrid, Spain; their aim was to establish a diplomatic exchange project in order to share knowledge about Latin America, with a view to the Lithuanian Presidency of the Council of the European Union in 2013.

In 2018, celebrations took place in Mexico City to celebrate the centenary of Lithuania's independence, which was attended by the Ambassador of Lithuania accredited to Mexico and resident in the United States and members of the Lithuanian-Mexican community.

In 2023, both nations celebrated 85 years of diplomatic relations. In June 2024, Claudia Sheinbaum was elected as President of Mexico. Her paternal grandparents immigrated to Mexico from Lithuania in the 1920s.

== High-level visits ==
High-level visits from Lithuania to Mexico

- President Valdas Adamkus (2002 and 2008)
- Foreign Minister Antanas Valionis (2002)
- President Arturas Paulauskas (2004)
- Foreign Vice-Minister Oskaras Jusys (2008)

High-level visits from Mexico to Lithuania

- Foreign Undersecretary Miguel Marín (2002)
- Foreign Undersecretary Lourdes Aranda Bezaury (2012)

== Bilateral agreements ==
Both nations have signed several bilateral agreements such as a Treaty of Friendship (1938); Agreement of Cooperation in the Fields of Education, Culture, Art and Sport (2002); Agreement for the Suppression of Visas in Diplomatic and Official Passports (2002) and an Agreement to Prevent Double Taxation and Prevent Tax Evasion in the Area of Income Tax and its Protocol (2012).

== Trade ==
In 1997, Mexico signed a Free Trade Agreement with the European Union (which includes Lithuania). In 2023, trade between Lithuania and Mexico totaled US$111.5 million. Lithuania's main exports to Mexico include: wheat, machinery and mechanical appliances, parts and accessories for motor vehicles, cheese and curd, peat, and wood. Mexico's main exports to Lithuania include: turbojets and other gas turbines, electric boards and consoles, chemical based products, medical instruments, pepper, and fish.

== Diplomatic missions ==
- Lithuania is accredited to Mexico from its embassy in Washington, D.C., United States and maintains an honorary consulate in Mexico City.
- Mexico is accredited to Lithuania from its embassy in Stockholm, Sweden and maintains an honorary consulate in Vilnius.

== Gallery ==
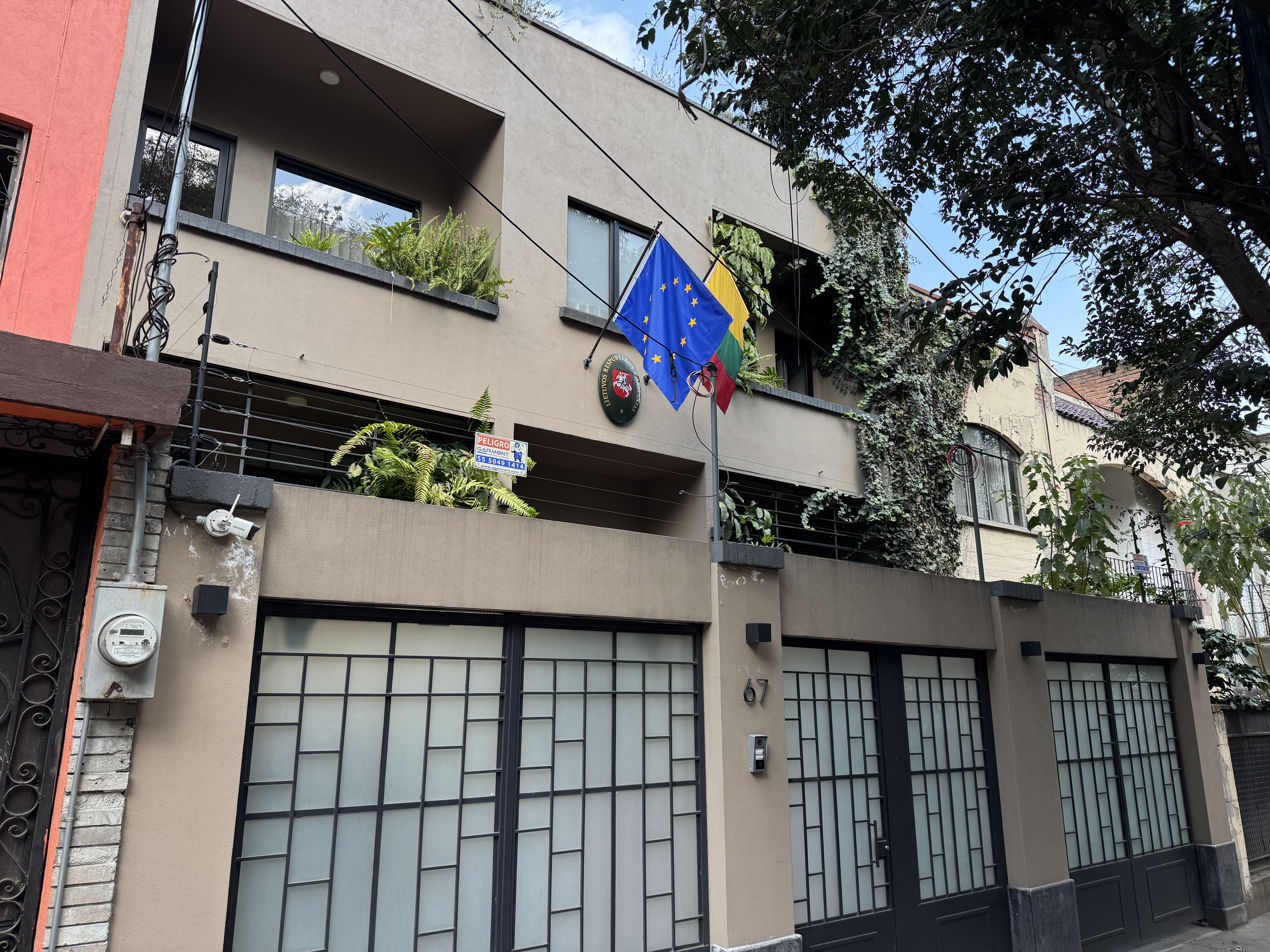
Honorary Consulate of Lithuania in Mexico City

The Historic Synagogue Justo Sierra 71 in Mexico City is a replica of a synagogue from Šiauliai, Lithuania

== See also ==
- Foreign relations of Lithuania
- Foreign relations of Mexico
