= Aline Pettersson =

Mexican novelist and poet

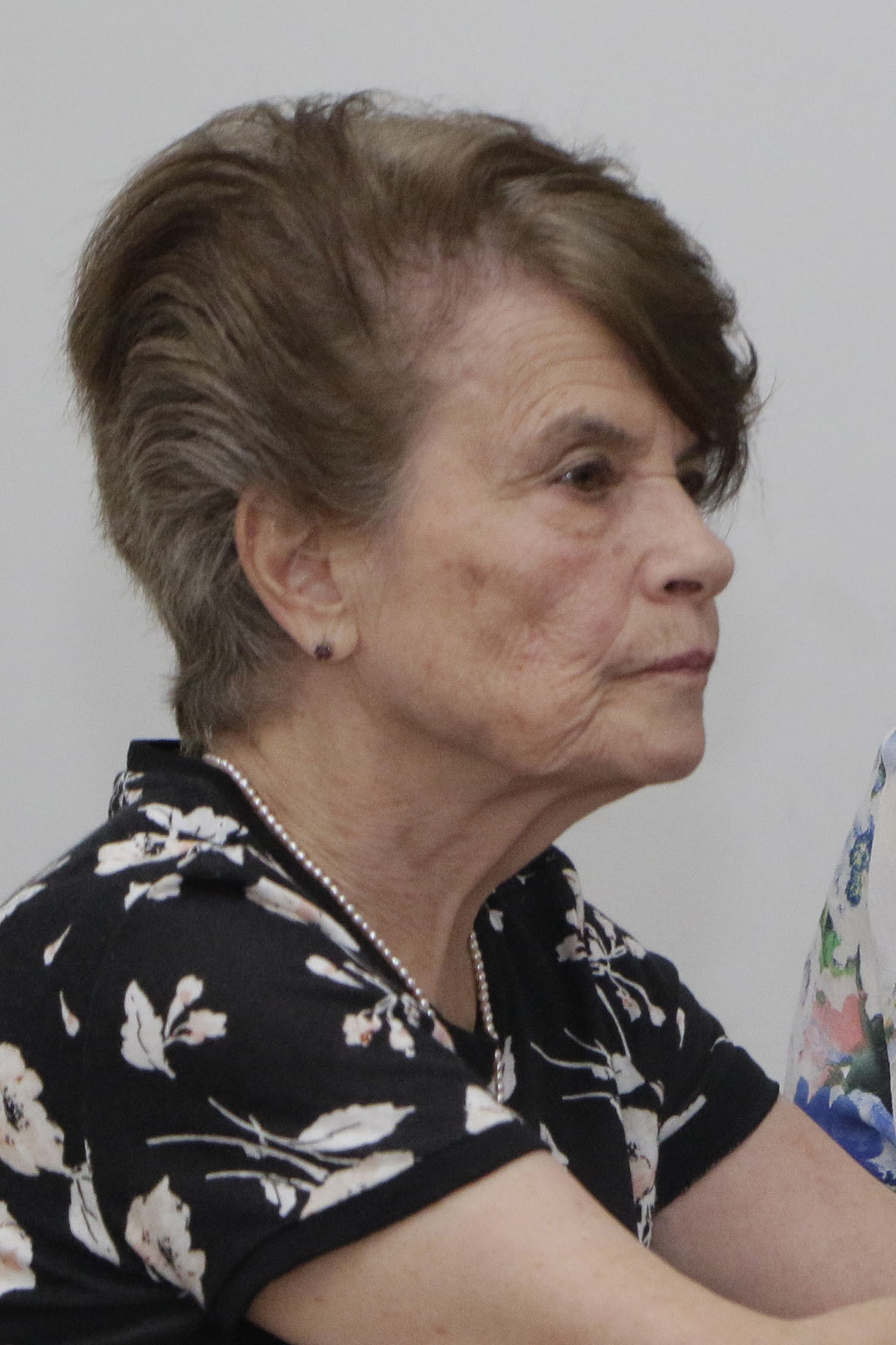

Aline Pettersson is a Mexican novelist and poet. Her novels deal with the themes of loneliness, heartbreak, isolation and the passage of time that razes all.

== Early life ==
Petterson was born in Mexico City on 11 May 1938. Her father was the son of Swedish parents. Pettersson recounts beginning to read with the children's books of author Monteiro Lobato. She was later introduced to the works of Charles Dickens, Luego vino Salgari and Sor Juana. Pettersson intended to study medicine, however she married young and had three children, but continued to write. She began to take courses at the Facultad de Filosofía y Letras of the UNAM.

== Career ==
In 1977, with the help of writer Salvador Elizondo, Pettersson published her first novel, Círculos. A majority of her protagonists are women. One of her favorite literary devices is the use of internal monologue- which she uses to explore "imaginary time" not real time. Her writing has been influenced by Virginia Woolf and Marcel Proust.

Pettersson is a member of the Sistema Nacional de Creadores de Arte del Fonca-Conaculta. She won the 1998 Premio Latinoamericano y del Caribe "Gabriela Mistral". The Instituto Nacional de Bellas Artes paid homage to Pettersson in 2008. She has been a collaborator with newspapers El Universal and La Jornada. She has translated Sorgegondolen (La fúnebre góndola, 2012) by Swedish poet Tomas Tranströmer.

== Bibliography ==
Poetry

- Tres poemas. Mexico: Oasis (Los Libros del Fakir; 71), 1985.
- Cautiva estoy de mí. Mexico: Secretaría de Educación Pública / Plaza y Valdés (El Nigromante), 1988.
- Enmudeció mi playa. Ilustración de Gilda Castillo. Mexico: Galería López Quiroga, 2000.
- Recuento. Mexico: Universidad Nacional Autónoma de México (Voz Viva de México), 2002.
- Estancias del tiempo. México, D.F.: Fondo de Cultura Económica (Letras Mexicanas), 2003.
- Carta a mi madre. Mexico: Instituto Nacional de Bellas Artes / Consejo Nacional para la Cultura y las Artes / Calamus Editorial (Poesía), 2007.
- Ya era tarde. Mexico: Fondo de Cultura Económica, 2013.

Prose

- Círculos. Mexico: Coordinación de Difusión Cultural (UNAM), 1977.
- Casi en silencio. Tlahuapan, Puebla: Premià (La Red de Jonás. Sección de Literatura Mexicana; 8), 1980.
- Proyectos de muerte. Mexico: Martín Casillas, 1983.
- Los colores ocultos. Mexico: Grijalbo, 1986.
- Sombra ella misma. Xalapa: Universidad Veracruzana (Ficción), 1986.
- Piedra que rueda. Mexico: Joaquín Mortiz (Novelistas Contemporáneos), 1990.
- Querida familia. Mexico: Diana, 1991.
- La noche de las hormigas. Mexico: Alfaguara, 1996. *Mistificaciones. México, D.F.: Universidad Autónoma Metropolitana / Aldus, 1996.
- Colores y sombras. Tres novelas. Presentación de Silvia Molina. México, D.F: Consejo Nacional para la Cultura y las Artes / Dirección General de Publicaciones [CONACULTA] (Lecturas Mexicanas. Cuarta Serie), 1998.
- Las muertes de Natalia Bauer. Mexico: Alfaguara, 2006.
- Deseo. Mexico: Alfaguara, 2011.
- A la intemperie. Mexico: Alfaguara, 2014.
- Clara y el cangrejo. Mexico: Dirección General de Publicaciones del Consejo Nacional para la Cultura y las Artes (La Tortuga Veloz), 1990.
- Más allá de la mirada. Mexico: Joaquín Mortiz, 1992.
- Ontario, la mariposa viajera. México, D.F.: Alfaguara (Alfaguara Infantil), 1993.
- Aline Pettersson. Selección y nota introductoria de María Luisa Mendoza. Mexico: Universidad Nacional Autónoma de México (Material de Lectura. Serie El Cuento Contemporáneo; 100) / Dirección de Literatura [UNAM], 1995.
- Renata y su gato. México, D.F.: Consejo Nacional para la Cultura y las Artes ( El Sueño del dragón), 1996.
- Fer y la princesa. México, D.F.: Andrés Bello, 1997.
- La princesa era traviesa. México, D.F.: Alfaguara (Alfaguara Infantil), 1998.
- Tiempo robado. Mexico: Alfaguara, 1999.
- El papalote y el nopal. México, D.F.: Alfaguara (Alfaguara Infantil), 2000.
- Renata y sus curitas. Mexico: Alfaguara (Alfaguara Infantil), 2000.
- Renata y su sorpresa. México, D.F.: Alfaguara (Alfaguara Infantil), 2001.
- Renata y su día al revés. México, D.F.: Alfaguara (Alfaguara Infantil), 2002.
- Los anteojos de Mariflor. Barcelona: Norma (Torre de Papel: Amarilla), 2003.
- Las batallas de Andrés. México: Alfaguara (Alfaguara Infantil), 2004.
- Vajes paralelos Mexico: Alfaguara, 2002.
