= Mario Schjetnan =

Mexican architect (born 1945)

Mario Schjetnan is a Mexican architect and landscape architect that manages to "unite social concerns, aesthetics and, increasingly, ecology- all by way of interpreting and celebrating Mexico's rich and diverse culture." He is co-founder of the interdisciplinary firm Grupo de Diseño Urbano in Mexico City known for designs in which the building is subordinate to the landscape. Among his numerous awards are the Prince of Wales/Green Prize in Urban Design for Xochimilco Ecological Park and the ASLA President's Award for Excellence for Parque El Cedazo.

== Background ==
Schjetnan was born in 1945 in Mexico City, a climate that gave him an immense appreciation for water that would appear in his later works. His paternal grandfather was a railroad builder and Norwegian immigrant. His father was an architect, professor and golf course designer while his mother had a degree in history and was interested in literature and theater. His parents' professions helped to inspire his own interests in 20th century modern architecture, pre-Columbian myth, and colonial history.

== Schooling ==
Schjetnan attended National University of Mexico (UNAM), where he received an undergraduate degree in architecture in 1968. There, he studied under such names as Ricardo Flores and Álvaro Sánchez and was taught the international designs of Le Corbusier and Louis Kahn. Mario went on to get a master's degree in landscape architecture with an emphasis in urban design from the UC Berkeley College of Environmental Design in 1970. At Berkeley, he was taught systems theory, ecological planning, and social inquiry techniques by Garrett Eckbo, Robert Royston, Donald Appleyard, and Ian McHarg. In 1985 Schjetnan was appointed a Loeb Fellow in Advanced Environmental Studies at the Harvard Design School and received an honorary PhD from the Universidad Autónoma de Nuevo León in 1995.

== Influences ==
In contrast to his father's inspirations, young Mario was influenced by Mexican Modern Architects such as Luis Barragán, Max Cetto, and Mario Pani. In terms of landscape design, Schjetnan was drawn towards the works of Luis Barragán, Roberto Burle Marx and Lawrence Halprin. He was also interested in the revolution and work of leftist artists such as Diego Rivera, José Clemente Orozco, and Juan O'Gorman. Shortly after his graduation from UNAM, the events surrounding May 1968 in Paris and the Tlatelolco massacre in Mexico City inspired Shjetnan to design for social needs at the INFONAVIT (Mexico's federal institute for workers' housing). Now with over 40 years of experience in his firm, "ecology is increasingly becoming the organizing principle of his work." He is now inspired by architects such as Renzo Piano, Tadao Ando and Norman Foster in addition to environmental artists such as Doug Hollis, Richard Long, and James Turrel.

== Style & philosophy ==
Mario Schjetnan views public parks as an expression for environmental justice- an extension of the public housing work he did at INFONAVIT. He works with low budgets, basic materials and modest details while gaining financial and political support by linking public spaces with infrastructure improvement. He acknowledges the importance of landscape to both individual memory and public history by utilizing "critical regionalism": "self-reflective adaptation or transformation of both modernist and traditional design languages." The result is a "metropolitan ecology" in which architecture, urbanism, and nature coexist in a dynamic mosaic.

== Major works ==
1. Tezozomoc Park 2. Malinalco House 3. Mexican Cultural Center 4. Culhuacan Historical Park 5. Xochimilco Ecological Park 6. Parque Bicentenario 7. Malinalco Golf Club 8. Archaeological Museum 9. Parque El Cedazo 10. Chapultepec Park 11. Paquine Pueblo Museum 12. Cornerstone Garden 13. TecnoParque
