= Romanian Mexicans =

Mexicanos rumanos

Total population
- 569 (2020)

Regions with significant populations
- Mexico City, State of Mexico, Quintana Roo, Jalisco and Nuevo León

Languages
- Spanish (Mexican Spanish), Romanian

Religion
- Christianity

Romanian Mexicans are Mexicans with full or partial Romanian ancestry. Most of them work in Mexico as either professionals, concert artists, merchants or actors. According to the 2020 census of INEGI, there are 569 Romanians residing in Mexico.

== History ==
Since the second half of the 19th century, Romanians began to move to Mexico, establishing direct contacts with the country and with the Mexican people. The first of them arrived in Mexico in 1862, being part of the expeditionary force sent by the Emperor of France, Napoleon III, to defeat the Mexican rebellion led by Benito Juárez, (George Bibescu).

== Demographics ==
2010 - 246

2020 - 569

== Notable Romanians ==
=== Romanians living in Mexico ===
- Joana Benedek, actress.
- Gheorghe Gruia, handball player and coach.
- Andrea Noli, French actress of Romanian descent.
- Anca Mateescu, canoeist.

=== Mexicans of Romanian descent ===
- Alan Tacher, conductor.
- Humberto Elizondo, actor and son of the great actress and comedian Fanny Kaufman.
- Mark Tacher, actor.

=== Mixed Mexican Romanians ===
- Yeat, singer.

== See also ==
- Immigration to Mexico
- Mexico–Romania relations
- Romanian diaspora
- White Mexicans
- Romanian Americans
- Romanian Canadians
