= Edvard Emile Langberg =

Danish general who served in Mexico

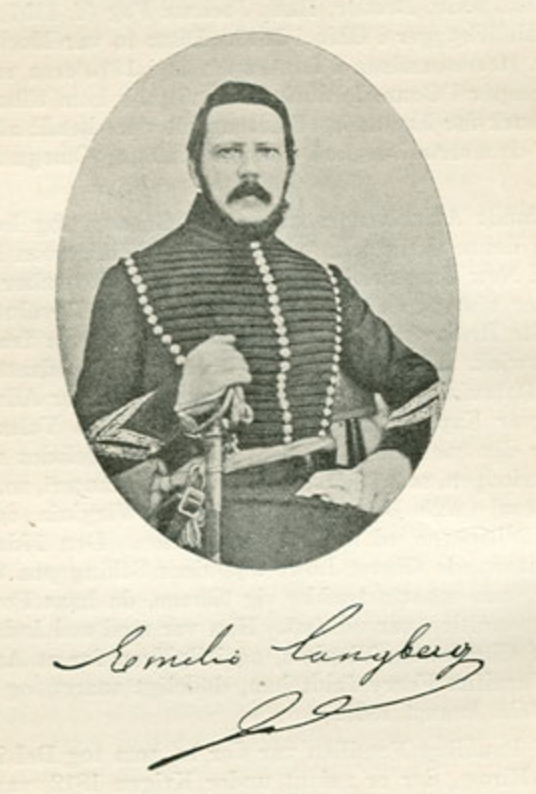
- Born: May 16, 1810; Copenhagen, Denmark
- Died: September 4, 1866 (aged 56); Guadalupe de Ures, Sonora, Mexico
- Education: Military College of Chapultepec
- Spouse: Elizabeth Seraphine Trepagnier (m. 1855–1865)
- Military career
- Allegiance: Centralist Republic of Mexico; Second Federal Republic of Mexico; Mexican Empire
- Branch: Mexican Army; Imperial Mexican Army
- Service years: 1835 – 1866
- Rank: General
- Conflicts: Mexican–American War; Northern Mexican Theater; Battle of Buena Vista; Mexico City Campaign; Battle of Contreras; Battle of Churubusco; Second Franco-Mexican War; Battle of Guadalupe †

Edvard Emile Langberg (1810 – 1866) also known in Spanish as Emilio Langberg was a Danish-Mexican general who served in Mexico's military during the mid 19th-Century. He participated in the various coups that the government experienced in the era, and defended his adopted country during the Mexican American War. During the War of Reform, he fought on the side of the liberals, and during the Second French Intervention in Mexico he joined the Second Mexican Empire and was eventually killed in action during the Battle of Guadeloupe in Ures, Sonora.

== Early military career ==
Edvard was born in Copenhagen, Denmark in 1810 as the son of Knud Engelbreth and Birgette (Jacobsen) Langberg. He was a notable violinist and had studied law. At the invitation of his brother Ludvig, who lived in Mexico, he emigrated to Mexico in 1835 from Hamburg via New Orleans. When he arrived in Mexico he soon became known in the social and political circles of the capital of the Republic. General Antonio López de Santa Anna put him in the Mexican Army with the rank of captain. In late 1841, he entered the faculty of the Military College of Chapultepec and was commander of a company of students. He was promoted to lieutenant colonel in 1845 and on December, he pronounced himself in San Luis Potosí with General Mariano Paredes y Arrillaga. In mid 1846, he also participated in the military coup led by General Mariano Salas, fought in the Mexican–American War in the battles of Buena Vista and the Valley of Mexico, and was promoted to colonel.

During the Mexican–American War, he was an officer under the command of General Gabriel Valencia in Ciudad Tula and in Ciudad Victoria. He also participated under the command of General José de Urrea in guerrilla-style fighting against American forces in Marín, Agua Negra, and Cerralvo in Nuevo León. These military raids were to cut off American supply lines and to assist General Santa Anna in his moves against General Zachary Taylor in 1847. Near Mexico City he fought in the battles of Contreras and Churubusco. He was decorated for his services in the fight against the Americans.

In 1848 he was a Political Chief of Paso del Norte and in that same year he became commissioner to the State of Chihuahua with the position of inspector of Military Colonies that gave him the character of second chief of the general command; he organized the new line in accordance with the Treaty of Guadalupe Hidalgo and returned to the interior in early 1854.

=== Family ===
On April 19, 1855, he married Elizabeth Seraphine Trepagnier, daughter of Laurent and Louise Reine Trepagnier, in New Orleans, Louisiana, with whom he had no children. He had an illegitimate daughter named Helena María de la Luz, with Agustina Pareda. In 1855 he returned to Mexico and settled in Coahuila, he was looking for support against Santa Anna, fighting the Native Americans and helping the efforts of the Texan filibusters to find slaves who had escaped to Mexico. He was a military commander in the state.

=== Plan of Ayutla ===
He joined the Plan of Ayutla due to being a member of President Comonfort's chief of staff, accompanied him in the operations on the Conservatives who occupied Puebla, and was promoted to general. He supported the December 1857 coup and when Comonfort retraced his steps in January 1858, he ignored General Zuloaga as president, militated in the liberal ranks during the Reform War and rose to brigadier general.

In February 1860, Governor Muñoz, commissioned by General Degollado, appeared in Chihuahua to request resources in favor of the constitutional cause and continued to Sonora, presenting himself to Governor Pesqueira with the same object, also receiving support from Manuel María Gándara in that State. He then went to Sinaloa and became General Plácido Vega's second-in-command, took part in the Action of Espinal in which the conservative chief Domingo Cajén was defeated, and participated in the persecution of Antonio Esteves in Sonora.

=== Second French Intervention in Mexico ===
In 1864 he joined the Second Mexican Empire and he was appointed commanding general of the State of Sinaloa, he tried unsuccessfully to attract General Trías, Colonel Angulo and other republican chiefs to the cause of Maximilian I of Mexico, receiving harsh refusals and on October 5, 1865, he was appointed to the same position in the State of Sonora. He mobilized with activity and energy against the forces of García Morales and later against those commanded by General Martínez but was defeated and killed in the Battle of Guadalupe on September 4, 1866.

He was not a French general nor did he come to Mexico with the French, as has been erroneously believed and since 1850, he was listed as a member of the Mexican Society of Geography and Statistics, the maps of the limits and borders of Chihuahua and Coahuila with Texas prepared by the and its engineers are today in the cartographic collections of that society.

== See also ==
- Scandinavian Mexicans
