= Denmark–Mexico relations =

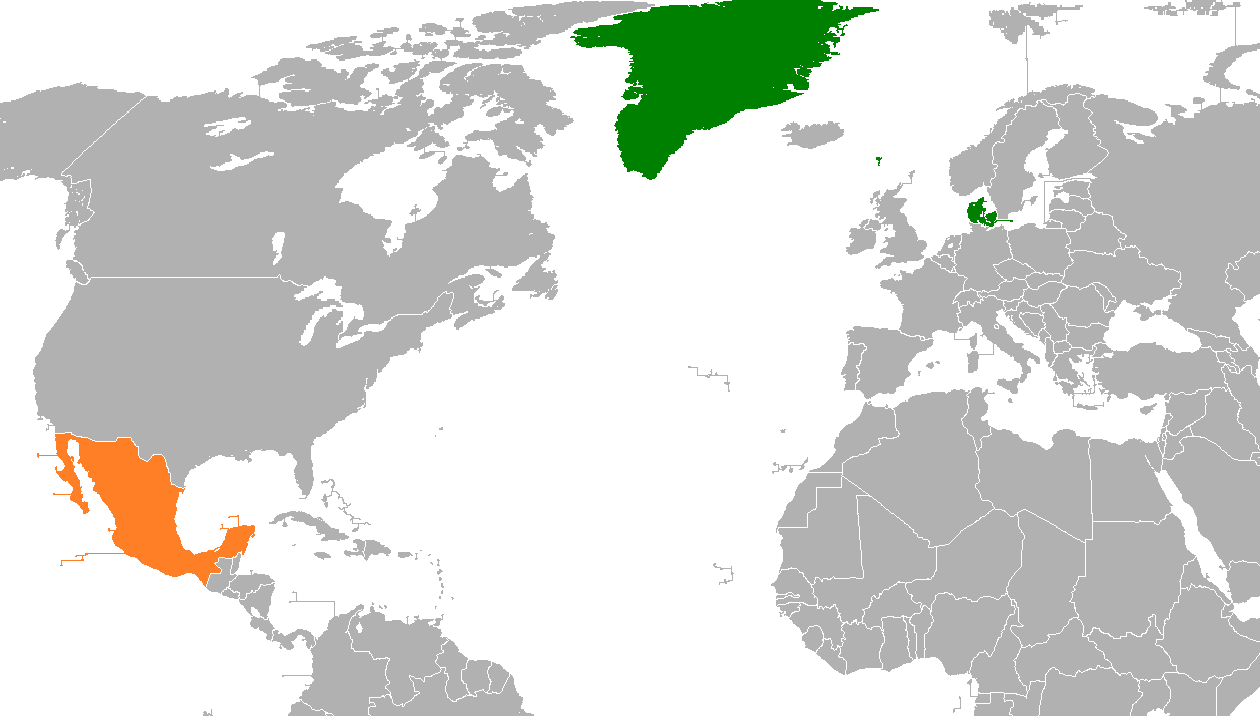

- Denmark: Mexico

The nations of Denmark and Mexico established diplomatic relations in 1827. Both nations are members of the Organisation for Economic Co-operation and Development and the United Nations.

== History ==
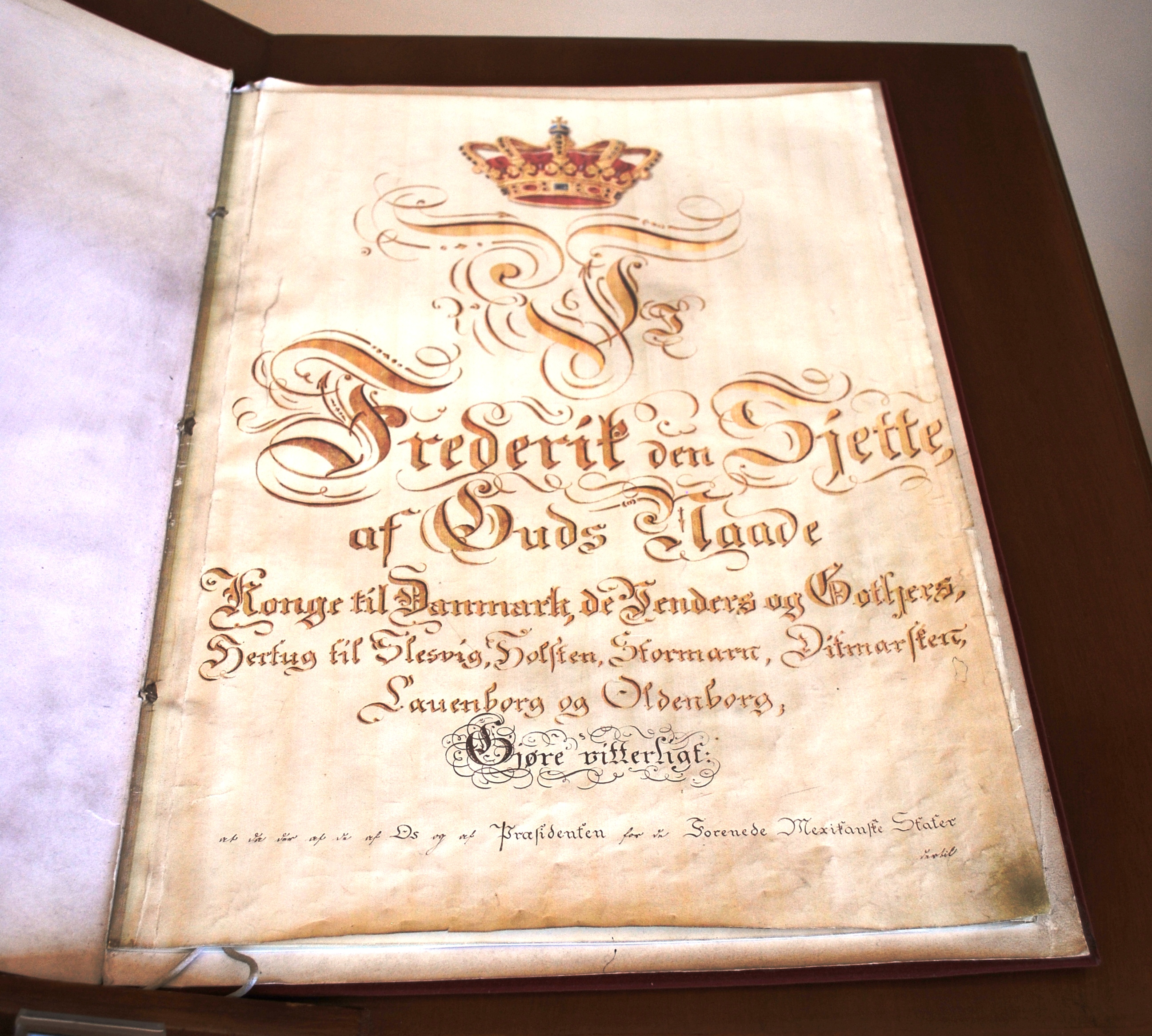
Treaty of Friendship, Trade and Navigation between Mexico and Denmark signed in 1827.

The first known Dane to visit Mexico was Brother Jacob the Dacian, a Danish prince who came to Mexico in 1542 and lived among the indigenous people in southern Mexico. Diplomatic relations between Denmark and Mexico began on 19 July 1827 with the signing of a Treaty of Friendship, Trade and Navigation between both nations.

In 1864, Mexico named its first minister (ambassador) to Denmark. Soon afterwards, an honorary consulate of Mexico was opened in Copenhagen under the Consulate-General of Mexico in Hamburg, Germany, and in March 1931 the first Mexican legation was opened in the Danish capital. During World War II, Mexico closed its legation in Denmark, while Denmark maintained its diplomatic office in Mexico open. Soon after the end of the war, Mexico re-opened its legation in Copenhagen and in 1956, both countries elevated their diplomatic representations to that of embassies.

In 1966, Crown Princess (and future Queen) Margrethe II of Denmark paid an official visit to Mexico. In 1989, Danish Prime Minister Poul Schlüter paid a visit to Mexico, becoming the first head-of-government to do so. In 2007 President Felipe Calderón made the first visit by a Mexican president to Denmark. In February 2008, Queen Margarita II returned to Mexico for a second visit.

In April 2016, Mexican President Enrique Peña Nieto paid a visit to Denmark. In April 2017, Danish Prime Minister Lars Løkke Rasmussen paid a visit to Mexico. That same year, both nations celebrated 190 years of diplomatic relations.

In June 2023, both nations held a second meeting of the Bilateral Political Consultation Mechanism, which was held virtually. In the meeting, Denmark and Mexico agreed on the next signing of the Joint Strategic Action Plan Mexico-Denmark 2023-2027: a roadmap with concrete actions in the areas of political dialogue, economic relations, cooperation in health, climate change and the environment, food, agriculture, culture, science, technology and innovation, with a transversal perspective based on sustainable development.

== High-level visits ==
High-level visits from Denmark to Mexico

- Queen (and as Princess) Margrethe II of Denmark (1966, 2008)
- Prime Minister Poul Schlüter (1989)
- Prime Minister Anders Fogh Rasmussen (2002, 2003)
- Prince Frederik (2013)
- Prime Minister Lars Løkke Rasmussen (2017)

High-level visits from Mexico to Denmark

- President Felipe Calderón (2007, 2009)
- President Enrique Peña Nieto (2016)

== Bilateral Agreements ==
Both nations have signed several bilateral agreements such as an Agreement for the Mutual Protection of the Works of their Authors, Composers and Artists (1954); Agreement for Economic Cooperation (1980); Agreement for Scientific and Technical Cooperation (1982); Agreement to Avoid Double Taxation and Prevent Tax Evasion in the Matter of Income and Property Taxes (1997); and an Agreement for the Promotion and Reciprocal Protection of Investments (2000).

== Transportation ==
There are direct flights between Cancún International Airport and Copenhagen Airport with TUI Airways.

== Trade ==
In 1997, Mexico signed a Free Trade Agreement with the European Union (which includes Denmark). Since then, trade between the two nations have increased dramatically. In 2023, two-way trade between both nations amounted to US$1.3 billion. Denmark's main exports to Mexico include: medicines, medical and surgical instruments, machinery, plastic, iron and steel products, parts and accessories of motor vehicles, food based products, and dairy based products. Mexico's main exports to Denmark include: data processing machines, telephones and mobile phones, electrical equipment, tubes and pipes of iron or steel, chemical based products, glass, alcohol, fruits and nuts, and fish.

Danish multinational companies such as Danfoss, Danisco, Grundfos, FLSmidth, Lego, Maersk, and Novo Nordisk (among others) operate in Mexico. Mexican multinational company Cemex operates in Denmark.

== Resident diplomatic missions ==
- Denmark has an embassy in Mexico City.
- Mexico has an embassy in Copenhagen.

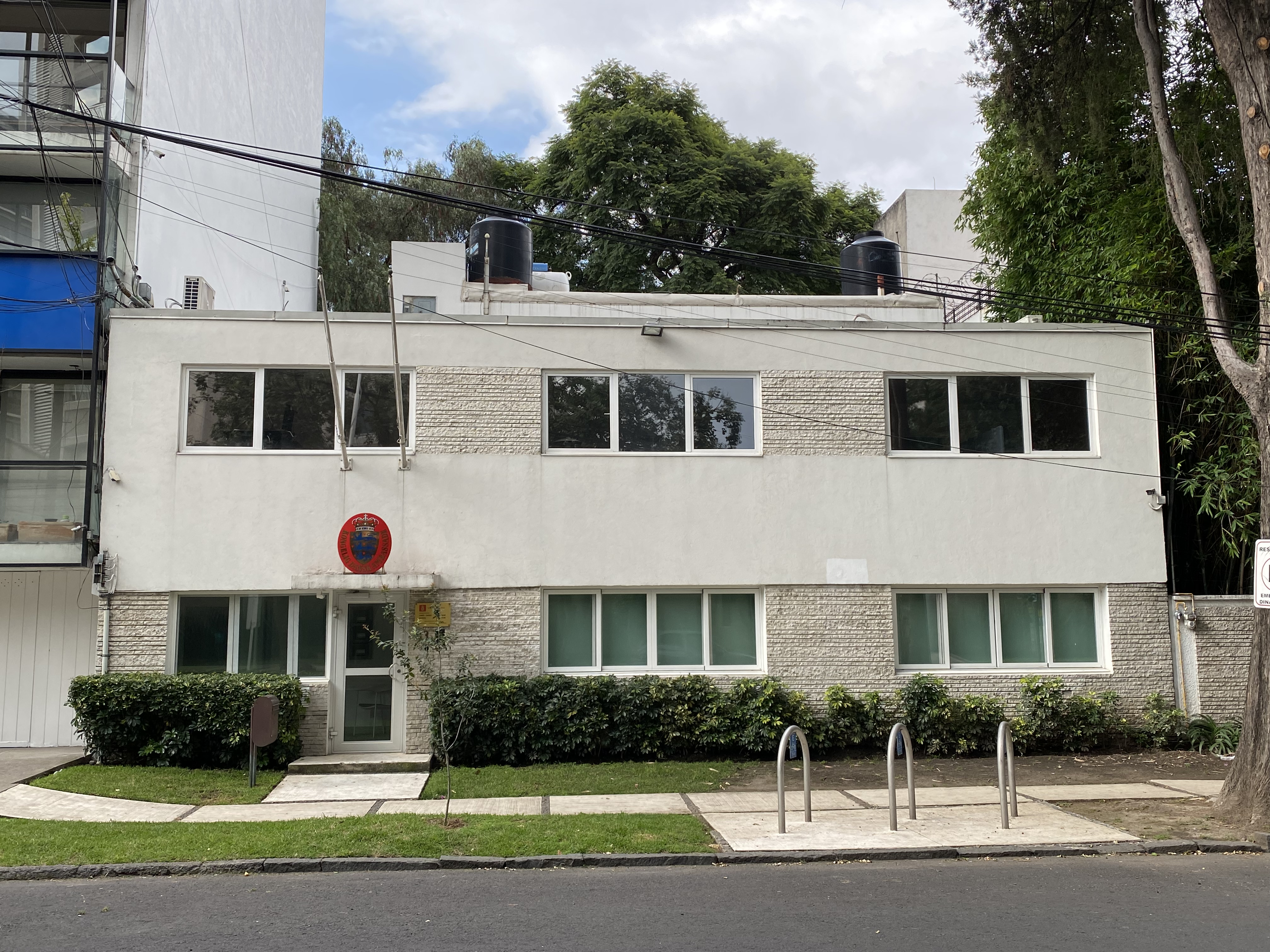
Embassy of Denmark in Mexico City

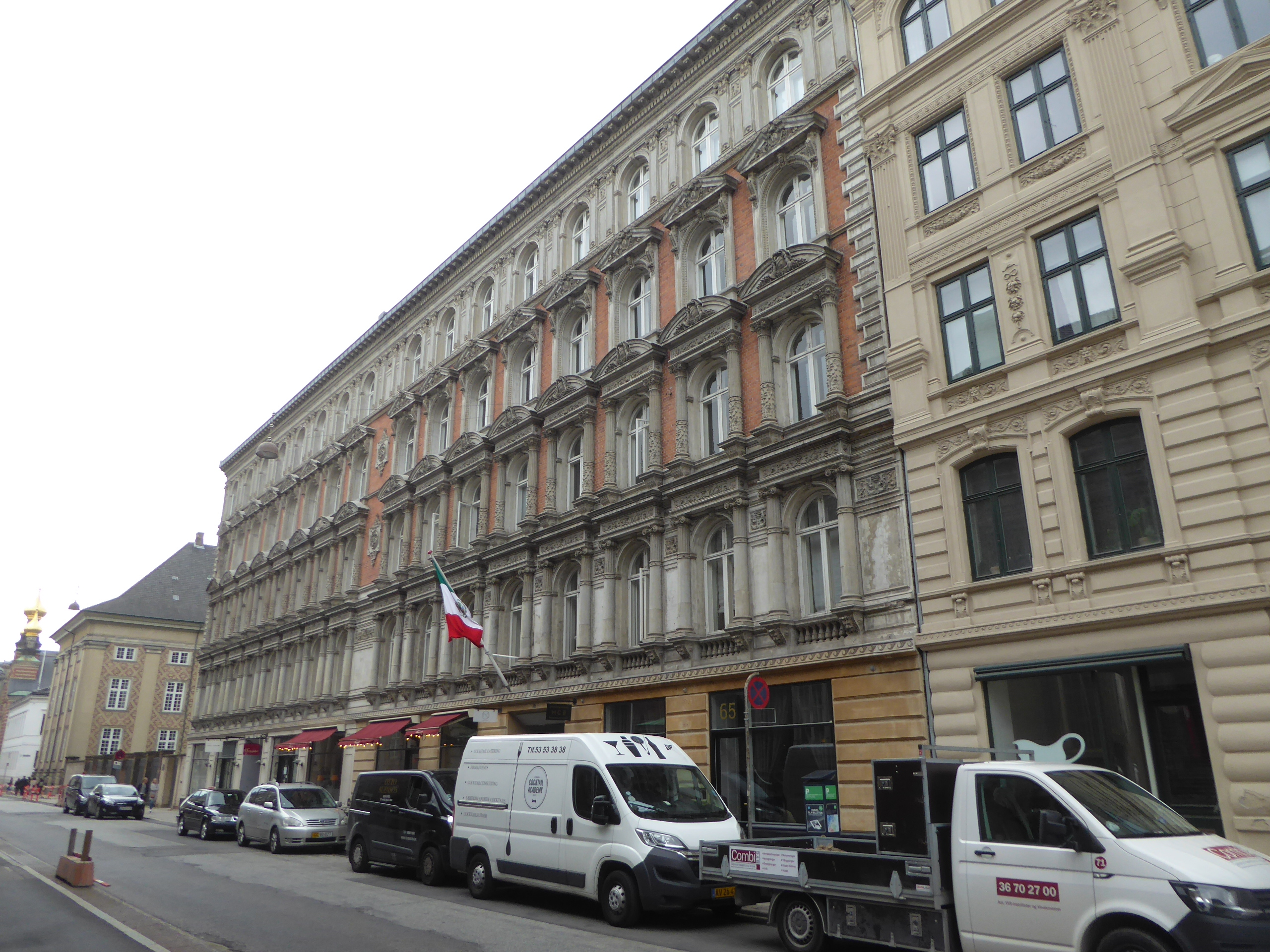
Embassy of Mexico in Copenhagen

== See also ==
- Scandinavian Mexicans
