= Historic Synagogue Justo Sierra 71 =

Orthodox synagogue in Mexico City, Mexico

- Spanish: Sinagoga Histórica Justo Sierra 71
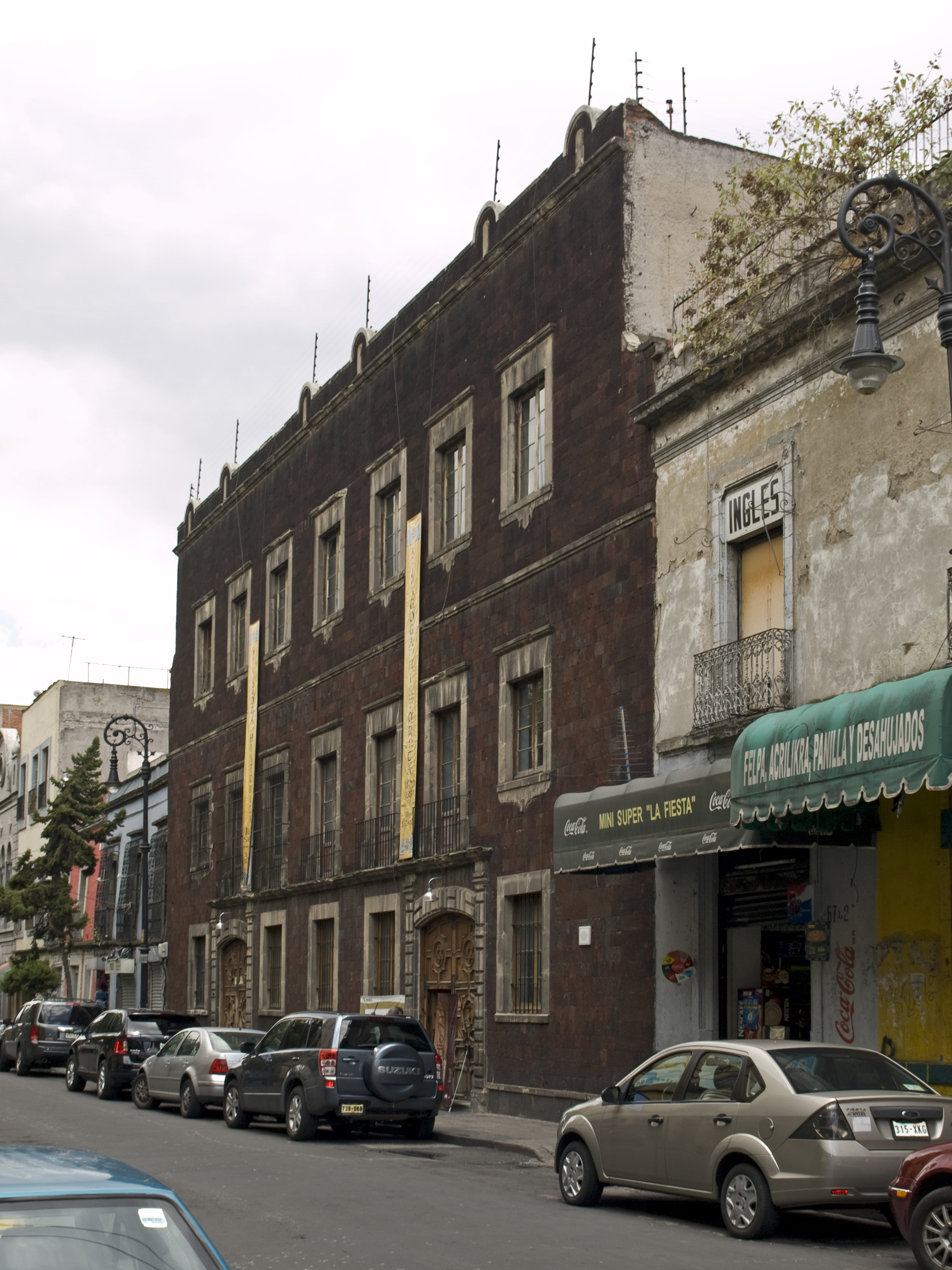
- The synagogue façade, in 2014

- Location of the synagogue in Mexico City

Religion
- Affiliation: Orthodox Judaism
- Ecclesiastical or organisational status: Synagogue (1941–1960s); Profane use (1960s–2009); Synagogue and cultural center (since 2009)
- Status: Active

Location
- Location: Justo Sierra 71, Historic center, Mexico City
- Country: Mexico
- Coordinates: 19°26′6.5″N 99°7′41.5″W

Architecture
- Architect: Raquel Franklin
- Type: Synagogue architecture
- Style: Neo-colonial; Romanesque Revival
- Completed: 1941

Website
- sinagogajustosierra.com (in Spanish)

The Historic Synagogue Justo Sierra 71 (Spanish: Sinagoga Histórica Justo Sierra 71), formerly known as Nidjei Israel Synagogue (Spanish: Sinagoga Nidjei Israel), is an Orthodox Jewish congregation, synagogue, and cultural center, located at Justo Sierra 71, in the historic center of Mexico City (Spanish: Centro Histórico de la Ciudad de México), in Mexico. The building was completed in 1941 and serves both as a synagogue and cultural center of the Ashkenazi Jewish community.

== History ==
The Nidjei Israel Synagogue is the third oldest in Mexico City, and the first founded by Ashkenazi Jews. The synagogue was built for Orthodox Jewish immigrants from Poland, Russia, and Lithuania in the La Merced neighborhood. It was the second Ashkenazi synagogue in Mexico City and its interior is a replica of the Synagogue of Shavel in present-day Šiauliai in Lithuania.

Closed from the 1960s, the synagogue was used for profane purposes for over thirty years, before being extensively restored and reopened in 2009 as a synagogue and cultural center. The building is open to the public for guided tours and other tourist activities. Despite being built in the 20th century, the synagogue was granted the title of Historic Synagogue (due to it being located in the historic district) and is one of the oldest in Mexico City.

== Architecture ==
Mónica Unikel-Fasja, in her book Synagogues of Mexico, wrote:

“The monumentality of the bimah (sort of pulpit) is impressive, undoubtedly the most elaborate of those existing in Mexico, placed in the center in the Ashkenazi fashion. It is made of richly carved wood with cut glasses describing musical instruments: drum, harp, zither and lute, as well as recurring Jewish symbols: the talit (religious shawl), palm leaf, citron and the Star of David among sacred prayers.“

— Mónica Unikel-Fasja, Synagogues of Mexico.

The Nidjei Israel Synagogue was created based on the need for prayer spaces as the Ashkenazi Jewish community of Mexico City grew. The synagogue functioned as a ceremonial, study, celebration and community work center until the mid-1960s. It remained closed for over three decades, but on January 2010 it was re-inaugurated with a community event and reopened to house various cultural and religious activities.

== Gallery ==
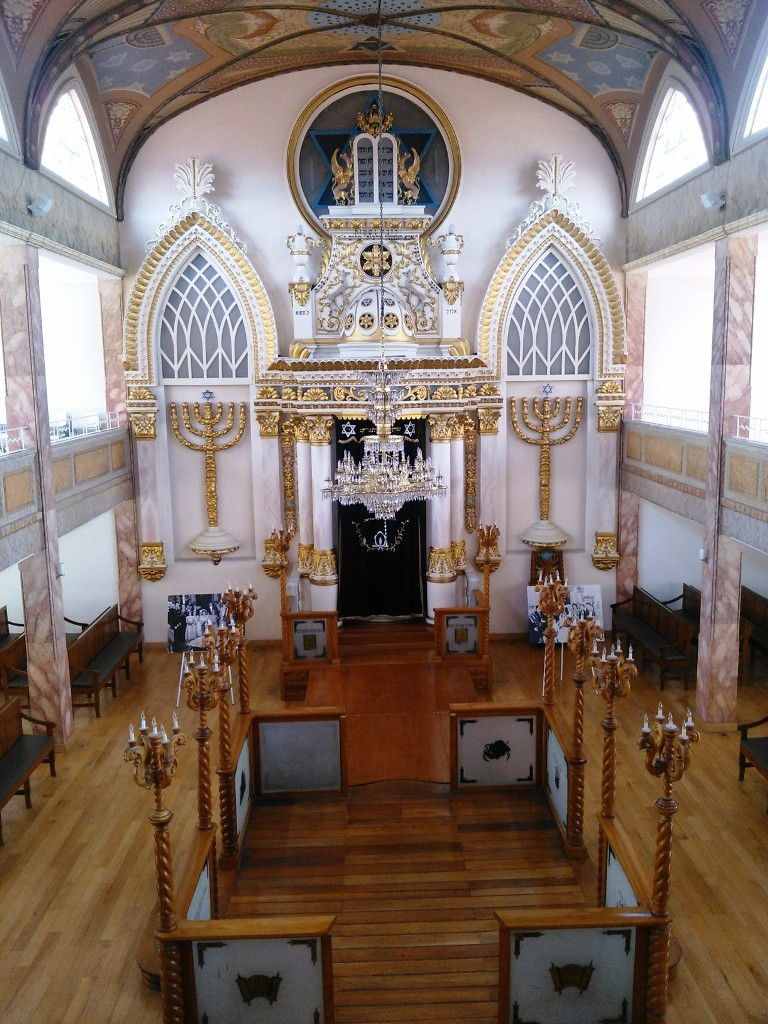
Interior of the synagogue, in 2013

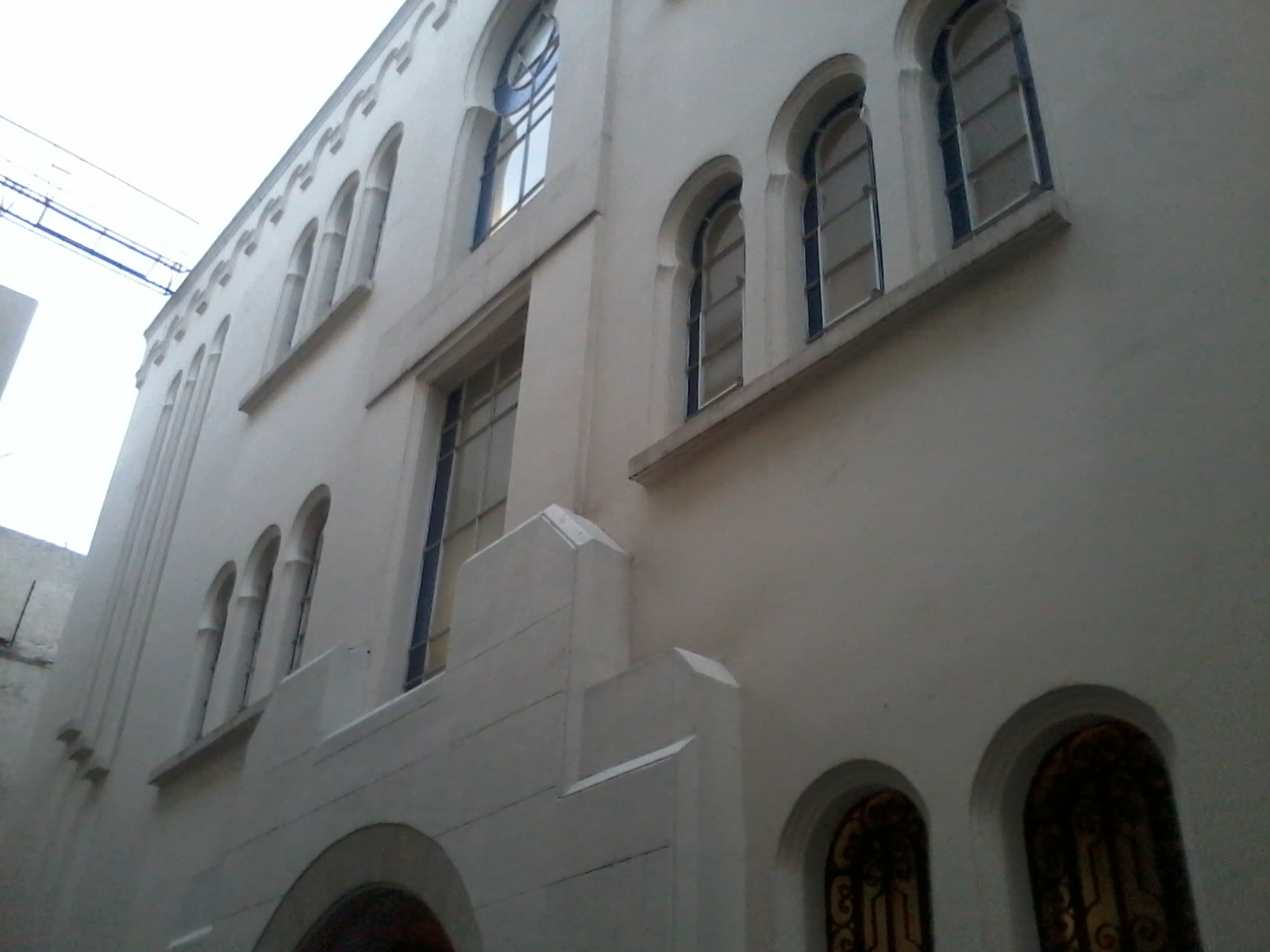

== See also ==
- History of the Jews in Mexico
- List of synagogues in Mexico
