= Mexico–Romania relations =

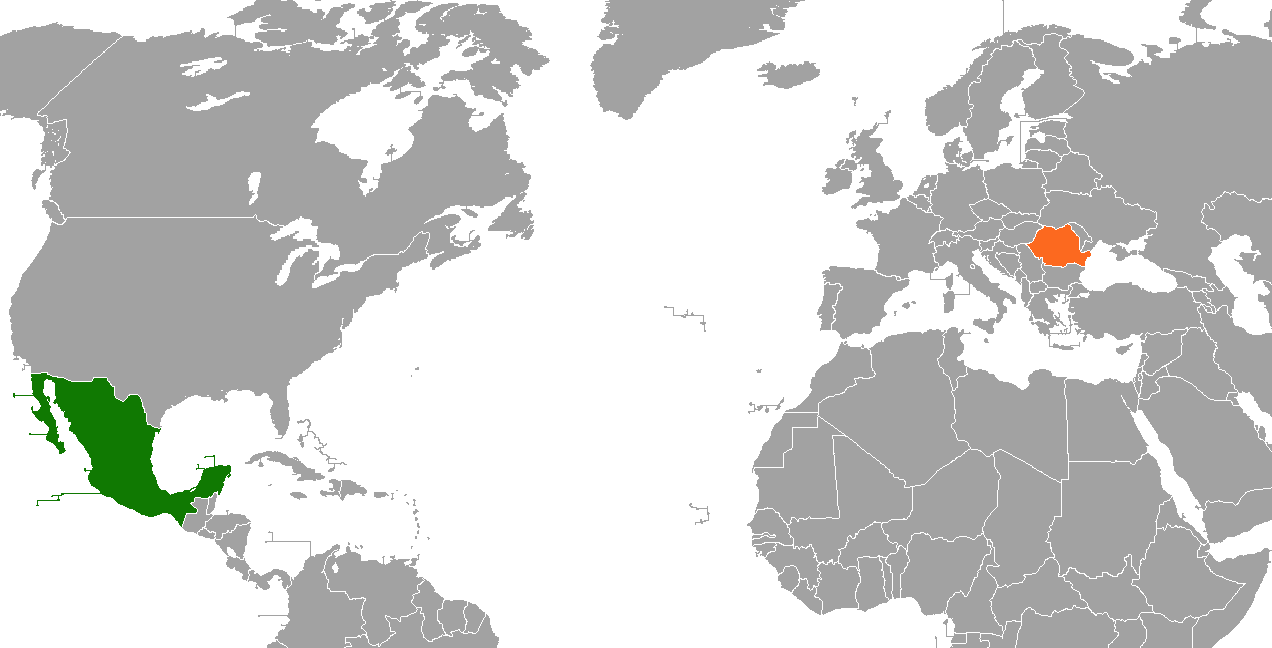

- Mexico: Romania

The nations of Mexico and Romania first established contact in 1880, however, diplomatic relations between both nations were officially established in 1935. Relations were severed during World War II and re-established in 1973 and have continued unabated since.

Both nations are mutual members of the United Nations and the World Trade Organization.

== History ==
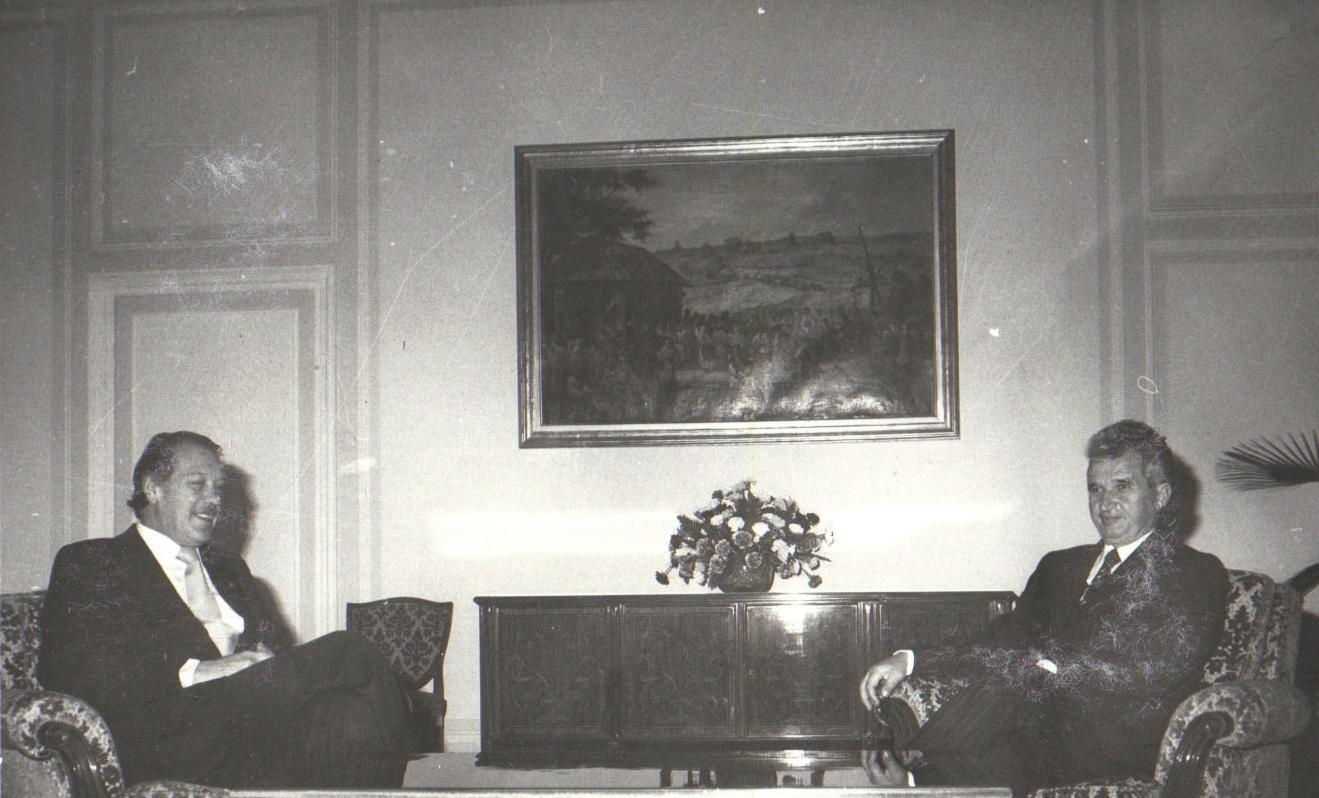
Former Romanian President Nicolae Ceaușescu receiving Mexican Foreign Minister Jorge Castañeda y Álvarez de la Rosa in Bucharest, 1979.

Knowledge of Mexico in Romania goes back to the early sixteenth century when a series of manuscripts on pre-Columbian priests and cultures circulated in Romania. In the seventeenth century, maize (originally a crop from Mexico) was introduced to Romania and in subsequent centuries, Romania would become one of the largest producers of the crop. During the Second French intervention in Mexico, several Romanian soldiers participated with the French army sent by Napoleon III to assist Emperor Maximilian I of Mexico.

The first official contact between Mexico and Romania was in April 1880 when Prince Carol I of Romania sent a letter to Mexican President Porfirio Díaz informing him of Romania's independence from the Ottoman Empire by the Treaty of Berlin in 1878. Diplomatic relations between Mexico and Romania were officially established on 20 July 1935 in Paris between foreign ministers of both nations.

In 1940, Romanian King Carol II abdicated his throne and went into exile, initially to Mexico. The former King was a guest of Mexican President Manuel Ávila Camacho and was invited to observe Mexico's Independence Day parade in September 1941. On 24 December 1941, diplomatic relations were severed by Mexico when Romania joined the Axis powers during World War II.

In March 1973 diplomatic relations were re-established between both nations. Soon afterward, embassies were opened in both nations capitals respectively. In September 1989, Mexico closed its embassy in Bucharest for financial reasons; however, the embassy was re-opened in 1995. In 1974, Romanian President Nicolae Ceaușescu became the first Romanian head of state to pay an official visit to Mexico. Since the initial visit, there have been other high-level visits from Romania to Mexico, the latest in 2015 by Prime Minister Victor Ponta. To date, there have only been high-level visits from Mexican Foreign Ministers to Romania. In 2020, both nations celebrated 85 years of diplomatic relations.

In February and March 2022, Mexico sent military transport planes to Romania to pick-up Mexican citizens, their Ukrainian family members and Latin-American citizens who resided and left Ukraine due to the Russian invasion of Ukraine. The Mexican government also donated humanitarian supplies to Ukrainian refugees in Romania.

== High-level visits ==
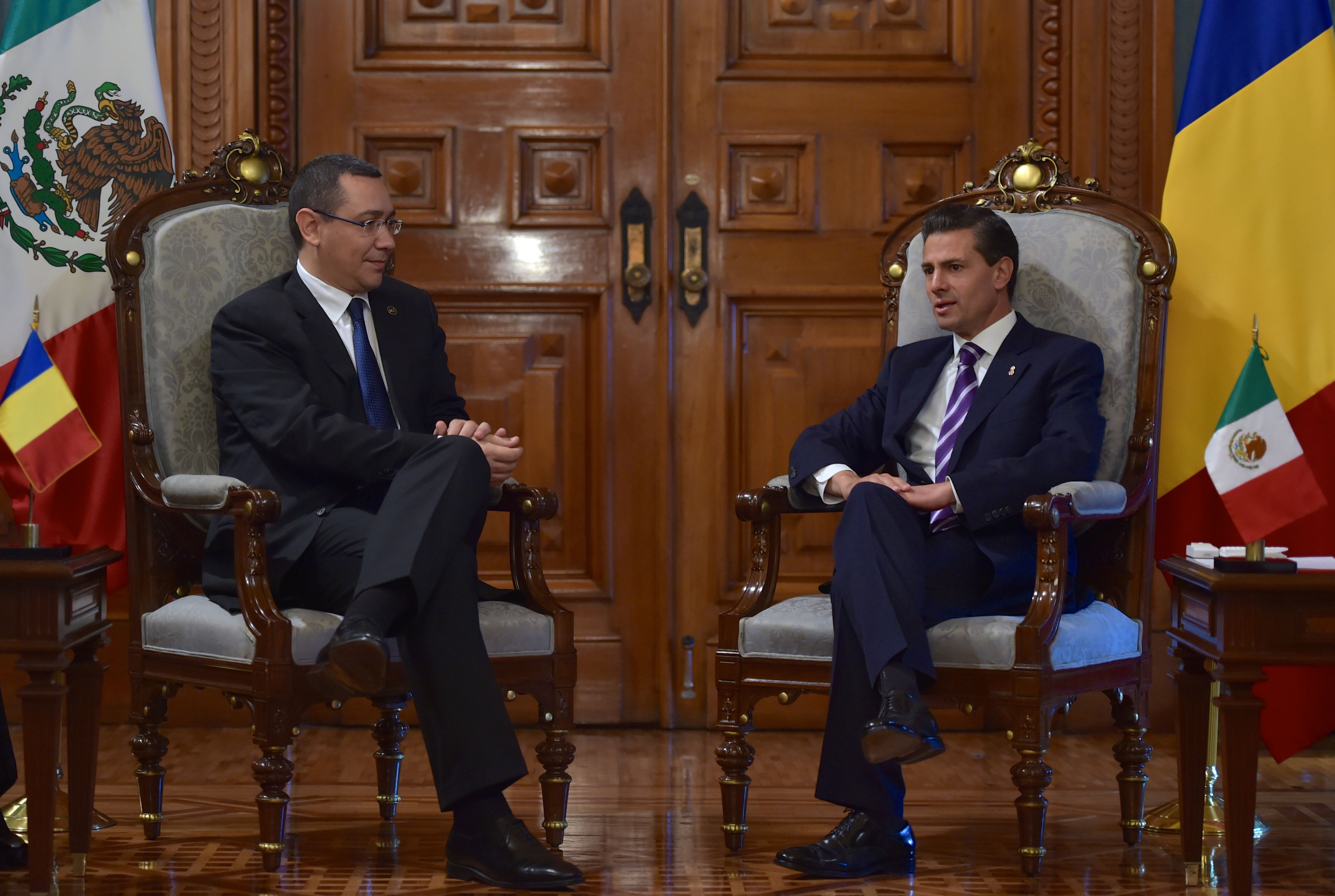
Romanian Prime Minister Victor Ponta meeting with Mexican President Enrique Peña Nieto in Mexico City; 2015

High-level visits from Mexico to Romania

- Foreign Minister Jorge Castañeda y Álvarez de la Rosa (1979)
- Foreign Minister Rosario Green (1999)

High-level visits from Romania to Mexico

- President Nicolae Ceaușescu (1974)
- President Emil Constantinescu (2000)
- President Ion Iliescu (2002)
- Prime Minister Victor Ponta (2015)
- Deputy Prime Minister Ana Birchall (2018)

== Bilateral agreements ==
Both nations have signed several bilateral agreements such as an Agreement on Cinematographic Cooperation (1974); Agreement on Economic, Industrial, Farming and Environmental Cooperation (1974); Agreement on Mining and Energy Cooperation (1974); Agreement on Oil and Petrochemical Cooperation (1974); Tourism Cooperation (1994); Agreement on Scientific and Technical Cooperation (1994); Agreement on Cooperation to Combat Illicit Trafficking in Narcotic Drugs and Psychotropic Substances and Related Crimes (1999); Agreement on Cultural, Youth and Sports Cooperation (1999) and an Agreement on the Avoidance of Double Taxation and Tax Evasion (2001).

== Trade ==
In 1997, Mexico and the European Union (which includes Romania who joined the union in 2007) signed a free trade agreement. In 2023, two-way trade between both nations amounted to US$709 million. Mexico's main exports to Romania include: building materials, automobile parts, paper, beer and tequila. Romania's main exports to Mexico include: cylinders, circuits, automobile parts and fiber optic cables. Mexican multinational companies Grupo Alfa, Grupo Bimbo, Cemex and Sigma Alimentos (among others) operate in Romania. Romanian gaming company, Amber, operates in Mexico.

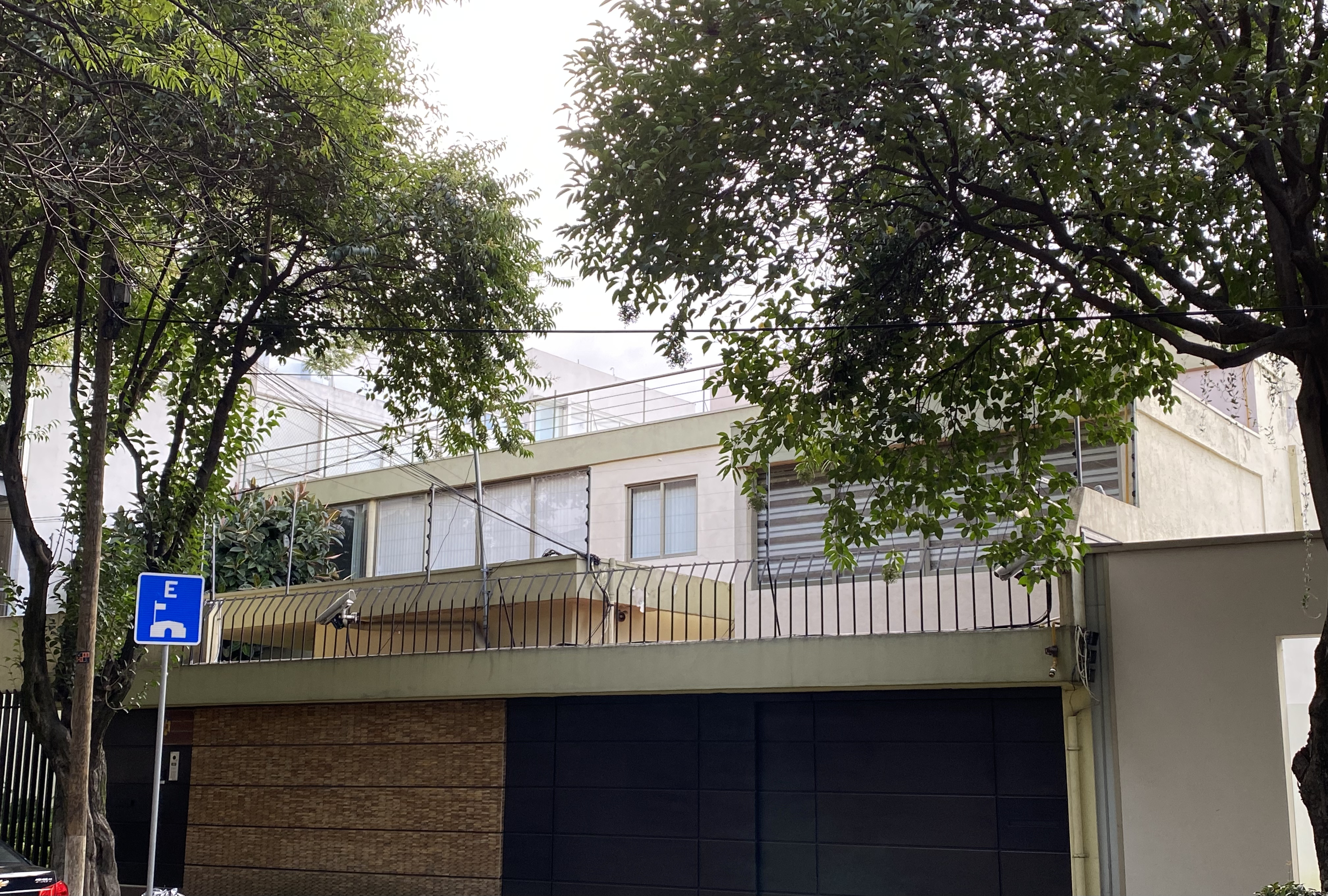
Embassy of Romania in Mexico City

== Resident diplomatic missions ==
- Mexico has an embassy in Bucharest.
- Romania has an embassy in Mexico City.

== See also ==
- Foreign relations of Mexico
- Foreign relations of Romania
- Romanian Mexicans
