= Waldemar Sjölander =

Swedish artist

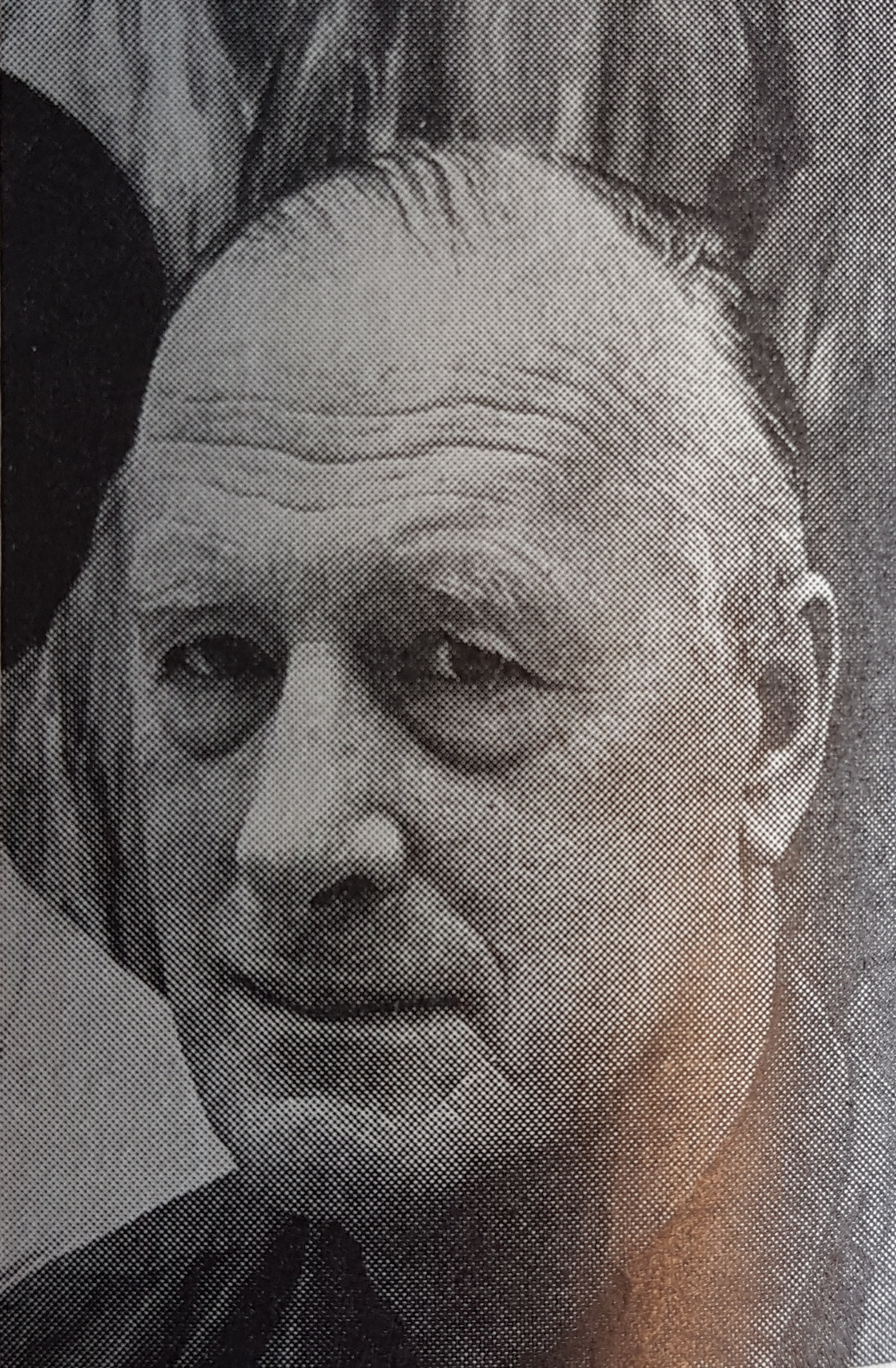
- Waldemar Sjölander.
- Born: January 6, 1908; Gothenburg, Sweden
- Died: March 18, 1988 (aged 80); Mexico City, Mexico
- Known for: painting, printmaking, sculpture

Gustav Waldemar Sjölander Johnson (January 6, 1908 – March 18, 1988) was a Swedish painter, printmaker and sculptor, who developed most of his career in Mexico. He immigrated to the country just after World War II, after establishing himself as an artist in his native Sweden. His career included individual exhibitions in venues such as the Palacio de Bellas Artes in Mexico and the Konstakademin in Sweden, with his works held by museums in Mexico and Europe.

== Life ==
Sjölander was born on January 6, 1908, in Gothenburg, Sweden, the son of an engineer and inventor of locks for safes. As a child, he studied at the Free School of Fine Arts with Albert Edh and at the Valand Art School with Tor Bjurstrom. He also traveled with his father on business, which allowed him to study in other parts of Europe such as Denmark, Norway and France. In the 1920s, as a teenager, he was traveling as a sailor, traditional for young men of the country. During this decade he visited Veracruz and other Gulf ports of Mexico various times.

His visits to Mexico impressed him and by the end of the 1930s he decided to immigrate to the country, but World War II delayed his plans. During this war, he became an officer in a cavalry regiment along Sweden's border with Finland, studying Spanish from an old grammar book in his free time.

Sjölander became one of many fine artists that immigrated to Mexico in the 20th century. After he left his country at the end of the war, he first went to Cuba, where he stayed for a year. In 1947, he arrived again to Veracruz. He was attracted to Mexico as a kind of "tropical paradise" relatively unaffected by the vices of civilization and also free from the long winters of Sweden. Eager to explore his new home, the traveled the country, to Mexico City, Guadalajara, Tehuantepec, Juchitán and San Blas for two years, creating more than 200 paintings and many more drawings. He was particularly impressed with the landscapes in Oaxaca, but eventually settled in Mexico City.

Sjölander died in Mexico City on March 18, 1988, at the age of 80.

== Career ==
Sjölander began his artistic career in Sweden. He began creating prints, especially lithography in the mid 1940s, and to survive often had to paint cafes and other commercial establishments. In 1944, he had an individual exhibition at the Olsen Art Gallery, then at the Modern Art Gallery in 1945 and 1946. These exhibitions made him an established artist in his home country.

After arriving in Mexico, Diego Rivera and José Clemente Orozco helped the artist get his first individual exhibition in Mexico with the then Museo Nacional de Artes Plásticas of the Instituto Nacional de Bellas Artes in 1948, followed by another in 1950, where his work received favorable reviews. Other important individual exhibitions include another at the same museum in 1960, the Palacio de Bellas Artes in 1965 and 1969, the Salón de la Plástica Mexicana in 1957, 1958 and 1967, the Mer-Kup Gallery in Mexico City in 1966 and 1968 and the Konstakademie in Sweden in 1961. He also participated in numerous collective exhibitions in Mexico and countries such as Japan, France, Hungary and Cuba. Many of these were biennale events such as the Salón Annual de Pintura y Grabado in Mexico City in 1958, the International Biennale of Painting, Sculpture and Engraving in 1960, various biennales of the Instituto Nacional de Bellas Artes for sculpture in the 1960s, the International Printing Biennale in Tokyo in 1960 and 1972 and the Sao Paulo Biennale in 1961 and 1972. In 1982 he was elected to the selection committee for the Triennial of Sculpture.

Sjölander's works can be found in the collection of the National Museum of Sweden, the Modern Art Museum of Stockholm, the Tessin Museum in Paris, the Gothenburg Museum, the Museo de Arte Moderno, the Palacio de Bellas Artes, the National Museum of Rhodesia and the Casa de las Américas in Cuba.

In addition to producing art for which he never accepted the help of a patron, Sjölander also taught at the Escuela Nacional de Pintura, Escultura y Grabado "La Esmeralda" (1971-1985) and at the Escuela Nacional de Artes Plásticas (1977-1985). In 1985 he joined the Centro de Investigación y Experimentación Plástica.

Sjölander's work was recognized with various distinctions during his lifetime, including Knight's Decoration First Class from his home country of Sweden in 1959, membership in the Order of Saint Michael in France in the 1960s along with membership in the Salón de la Plástica Mexicana. He received the Xipe-Totec award at the First National Sculpture Biennale in 1962 and the first sculpture prize from the Salon de la Plástica Mexicana in 1971. Retrospectives of his work include one at the Palacio de Bellas Artes in 1985, one from the Instituto Nacional de Bellas Artes in 1991 and at the Museo Dolores Olmedo in 1998.

== Artistry ==
Sjölander painted, sculpted and did printmaking during his career, designing over 500 of the tools he used. In painting he worked in oils and in printing he worked in etching, dry point, lithography and monotype. He sculpted three-dimensional works along with reliefs (his specialty) in plaster, bronze and wood, with wood his most expressive medium. He often obtained his materials on his travels in Mexico, such as mahogany from Veracruz.

The artist's work, especially his painting, is noted for its use of color. In Sweden he was a member of a group called the "Colorists of Gothenburg" as an art movement in that country, which experimented with colors not before used there. When he arrived to Mexico, nature and the colors common in Mexico were very different from his home country and changes to his art began almost immediately, although in both places nature played a dominant role. His earlier work used bolder colors than later work, which became more subtle and delicate. Fernando Gamboa wrote that "His autonomy lies in his color, in the rich hues that never shatter the surface of the painting; the balance and originality of his sculptures reveal a unique resolution of form and style.

A large number of his paintings, reliefs and engraving relate to man and landscape, with only a few portraits such as one of his wife, Aurora, in 1952. His early work was more figurative, showing influence from Edvard Munch (whom he met in Oslo), Pablo Picasso, Henri Matisse and Pierre Bonnard and northern European Expressionism, due to his formal training. Although he was of the age of the Mexican Muralists, in Mexico he became part of the following Generación de la Ruptura. His work gradually became less figurative. By the end of the 1950s and early 1960s, the human figure began to divide and by the 1970s and early 1980s he work was more of an abstract analysis of form with silhouettes.
