= Foreign relations of Mexico =

The foreign relations of Mexico (United Mexican States) are directed by the President of the United Mexican States and managed through the Secretariat of Foreign Affairs. The principles of the foreign policy are constitutionally recognized in Article 89, Section 10, which include: respect for international law and legal equality of states, their sovereignty and independence, non-intervention in the domestic affairs of other countries, peaceful resolution of conflicts, and promotion of collective security through active participation in international organizations. Since the 1930s, the Estrada Doctrine has served as a crucial complement to these principles.

After the War of Independence, the relations of Mexico were focused primarily on the United States, its northern neighbor, largest trading partner, and the most powerful actor in hemispheric and world affairs. Once the order was reestablished, its foreign policy was built under hemispheric prestige in subsequent decades. During Cold War, Mexico supported the Cuban government since its establishment in the early 1960s, the Sandinista revolution in Nicaragua during the late 1970s, and leftist revolutionary groups in El Salvador during the 1980s. In the 2000s, former President Vicente Fox adopted a new foreign policy that called for openness, acceptance of criticism from the international community and the increase of Mexican involvement in foreign affairs, as well as a further integration towards its northern neighbors. A greater priority to Latin America and the Caribbean was given during the administration of President Felipe Calderón.

Mexico is one of the founding members of several international organizations, most notably the United Nations, the Organization of American States, the Organization of Ibero-American States, the OPANAL and the Rio Group. For a long time, Mexico has been one of the largest contributors to the United Nations regular budget, in 2008 over 40 million dollars were given to the organization. In addition, it was the only Latin American member of the Organisation for Economic Co-operation and Development since it joined in 1994 until the accession of Chile in 2010. Mexico is considered a newly industrialized country, a regional power and an emerging market, hence its presence in major economic groups such as the G8+5 and the G-20 major economies.

== Foreign policy ==
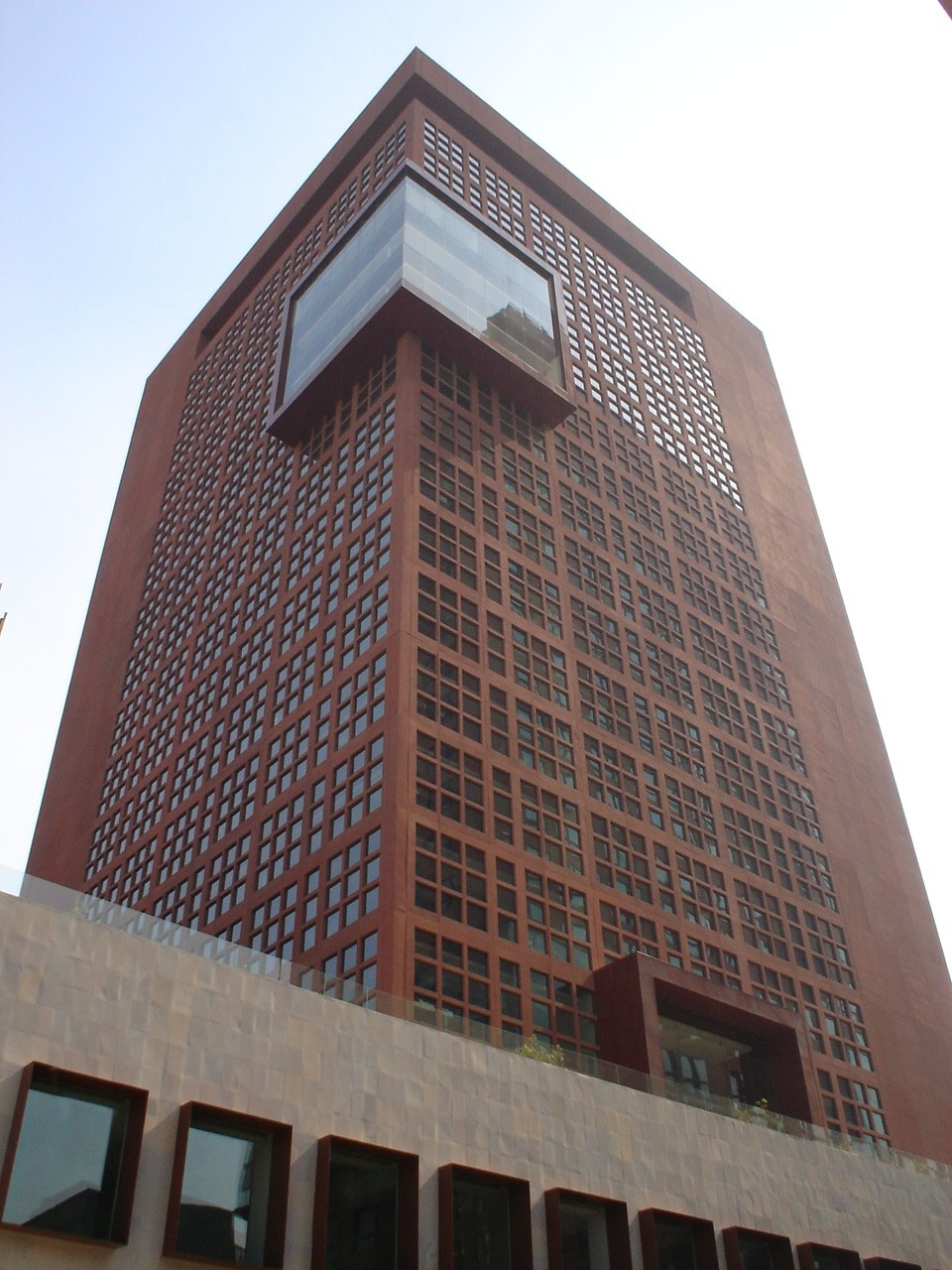
Current headquarters of the Secretariat of Foreign Affairs.

Article 89, Section 10 of the Political Constitution of the United Mexican States states the principles of the Mexican foreign policy, which were officially incorporated in 1988. The direction that the foreign policy will take lies with the President, as the head of state, and it is executed through the Secretary of Foreign Affairs. The article states:

The powers and duties of the President are the following:

X. To direct the foreign policy and conclude international treaties, as well as end, denounce, suspend, modify, emend, retire reserves and formulate interpretative declarations about the formers, submitting them to the ratification of the Senate. In the conducting of this policy, the Head of the Executive Power will observe the following standard principles: the self-determination of peoples, the non-intervention, the peaceful resolution of disputes, the proscription of threat or the use of force in the international relations, the legal equality of states, the international cooperation for development, and the struggle for international peace and security.

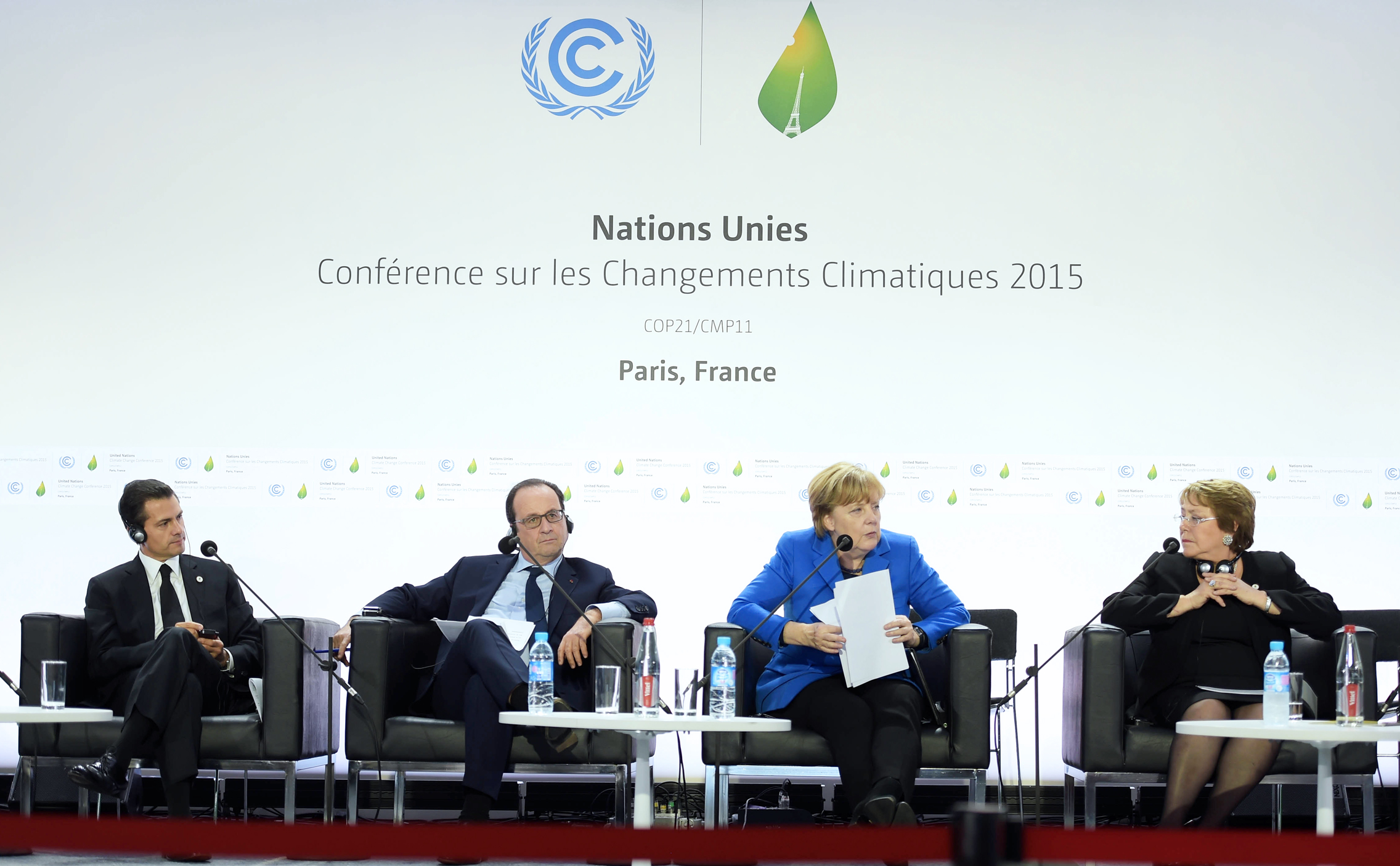
The heads of delegations from left to right: Enrique Peña Nieto, François Hollande, Angela Merkel, Michelle Bachelet at the 2015 United Nations Climate Change Conference.

Aside from these constitutionally recognized principles, the foreign policy has been based on some doctrines. The Estrada Doctrine as the most influential and representative instrument in this field, proclaimed in the early 1930s and strictly applied until 2000, claimed that foreign governments should not judge, positively or negatively, the governments or changes in government of other nations, since such action would be a breach of their sovereignty. This policy was said to be based on the principles of non-intervention, peaceful resolution of disputes and self-determination of all nations.

During the first presidency of the National Action Party, Vicente Fox appointed Jorge Castañeda to be his Secretary of Foreign Affairs. Castañeda immediately broke with the Estrada Doctrine, promoting what was called by critics the "Castañeda Doctrine". The new foreign policy called for an openness, acceptance of criticism from the international community, and increase of Mexican involvement in foreign affairs.

On November 28, 2006, former President Felipe Calderón announced that Patricia Espinosa would serve as his Secretary of Foreign Affairs starting on December 1, 2006. He declared priorities including the diversification of the Mexico–United States agenda, heavily concentrated on immigration and security issues, and the rebuilding of diplomatic relations with Cuba and Venezuela, which were heavily strained during the Fox administration, as well as giving greater priority to Latin America and the Caribbean states.

== Diplomatic relations ==
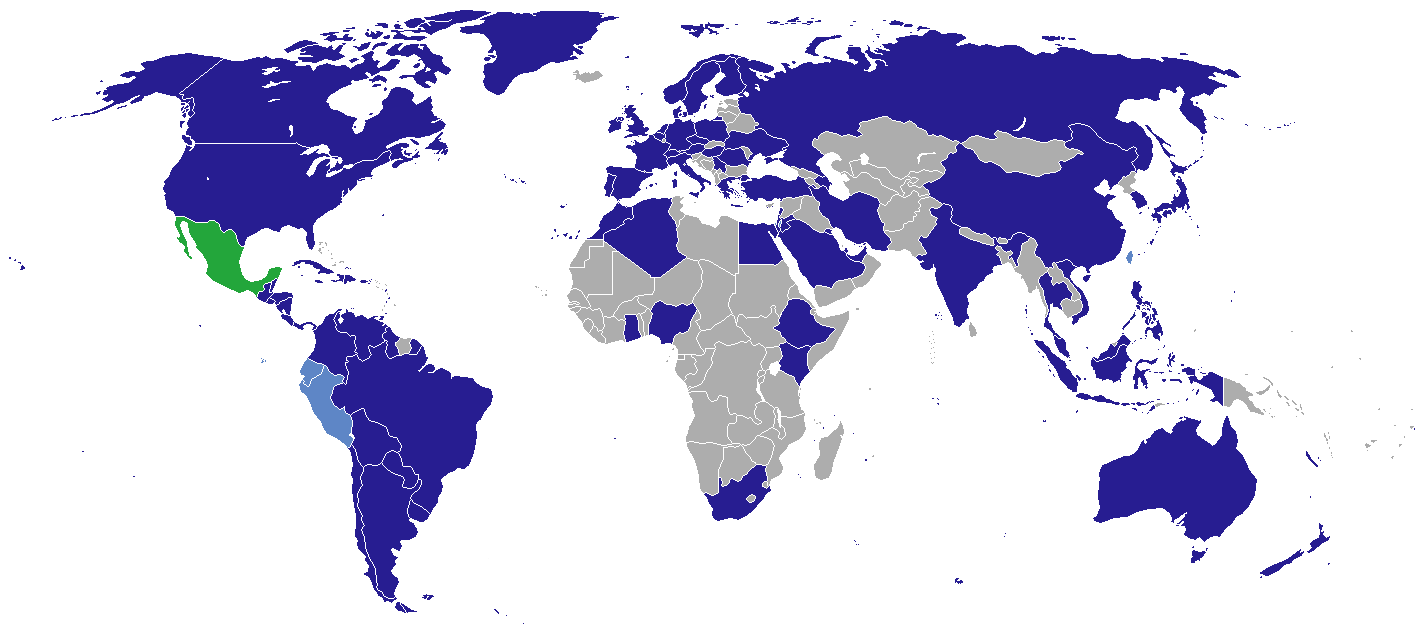
Mexican diplomatic missions overseas. Mexico. Embassy. Representative Office in the Palestinian Authority and Mexican Trade Office in Taiwan.

The Mexican foreign service officially started in 1822, the year after the signing of the Treaty of Córdoba, which marked the beginning of the country's independence. In 1831, legislation was passed that underpinned the establishment of diplomatic representations with other states in Europe and the Americas.

As a regional power and emerging market, Mexico holds a significant global presence. As of 2009, the Secretary of Foreign Affairs has over 150 representations at its disposal overseas, which include:

- 79 embassies.
- 68 consulates.
- 8 permanent missions.

In the early 1970s, Mexico recognized the People's Republic of China as the sole and legitimate government of China, therefore issues related to the Republic of China (Taiwan) are managed through the Office of Consular Liaison under the circumscription of the Consulate General of Mexico in the special administrative regions of Hong Kong and Macau. In addition, Mexico does not recognize Kosovo as an independent country.

Historically, Mexico has remained neutral in international conflicts. However, in recent years some political parties have proposed an amendment of the Constitution in order to allow the Mexican army, air force or navy to collaborate with the United Nations in peacekeeping missions, or to provide military help to countries that officially ask for it.

== List of countries with diplomatic relations ==
List of countries which Mexico maintains diplomatic relations with:

#	Country	Date
1	United States	12 December 1822
2	Peru	23 January 1823
3	Colombia	3 October 1823
4	United Kingdom	26 December 1826
5	Denmark	19 July 1827
6	Netherlands	16 June 1828
7	Uruguay	22 February 1831
8	Chile	7 March 1831
9	Bolivia	21 November 1831
10	Brazil	30 May 1834
11	Venezuela	8 September 1835
12	Spain	28 December 1836
—	Ecuador (suspended)	15 November 1837
13	Belgium	March 1838
14	El Salvador	12 May 1838
15	Nicaragua	1839
16	France	27 February 1840
17	Guatemala	6 September 1848
18	Italy	15 December 1874
19	Costa Rica	3 August 1876
20	Honduras	26 February 1879
21	Portugal	6 December 1879
22	Paraguay	3 October 1883
23	Sweden	29 July 1885
24	Dominican Republic	23 July 1888
25	Japan	30 November 1888
26	Argentina	20 December 1888
27	Russia	11 December 1890
28	Cuba	20 May 1903
29	Panama	1 March 1904
30	Norway	9 April 1906
31	Czech Republic	20 July 1922
32	Hungary	13 January 1926
33	Austria	14 July 1927
34	Poland	26 February 1928
35	Turkey	12 July 1928
36	Haiti	11 July 1929
37	Romania	26 July 1935
38	Finland	2 October 1936
39	Bulgaria	6 January 1938
40	Greece	17 May 1938
41	Canada	30 January 1944
42	Lebanon	12 June 1945
43	Switzerland	22 December 1945
44	Serbia	28 May 1946
45	Luxembourg	8 January 1947
46	Ethiopia	1 November 1949
47	India	1 August 1950
48	Syria	20 August 1950
49	Iraq	25 September 1950
50	Israel	1 July 1952
51	Germany	29 August 1952
52	Saudi Arabia	12 September 1952
53	Indonesia	6 April 1953
54	Philippines	14 April 1953
55	Pakistan	19 January 1955
56	Egypt	31 March 1958
57	Sri Lanka	19 April 1960
58	Afghanistan	27 June 1961
59	Ghana	8 August 1961
60	Tunisia	16 November 1961
61	Guinea	25 January 1962
62	South Korea	26 January 1962
63	Senegal	9 May 1962
64	Morocco	31 October 1962
65	Iceland	24 March 1964
66	Iran	15 October 1964
67	Algeria	21 October 1964
68	Australia	14 March 1966
69	Trinidad and Tobago	29 April 1966
70	Jamaica	4 February 1967
71	China	14 February 1972
72	Barbados	11 September 1972
73	Tanzania	19 February 1973
74	Guyana	1 March 1973
75	New Zealand	19 July 1973
76	Bahamas	23 January 1974
77	Cyprus	21 February 1974
78	Malaysia	27 March 1974
79	Albania	15 October 1974
80	Grenada	11 April 1975
81	Vietnam	19 May 1975
82	Mauritania	24 June 1975
83	Qatar	30 June 1975
84	Bangladesh	8 July 1975
85	Jordan	9 July 1975
86	Kuwait	23 July 1975
87	Democratic Republic of the Congo	31 July 1975
88	Oman	31 July 1975
89	Bahrain	5 August 1975
90	Somalia	5 August 1975
91	Yemen	5 August 1975
92	Libya	6 August 1975
93	Gambia	16 August 1975
94	Ireland	21 August 1975
95	Thailand	28 August 1975
96	Fiji	31 August 1975
97	United Arab Emirates	12 September 1975
98	Mongolia	24 September 1975
99	Cambodia	26 September 1975
100	Equatorial Guinea	26 September 1975
101	Zambia	15 October 1975
102	Malta	29 October 1975
103	Togo	29 October 1975
104	Benin	30 October 1975
105	Niger	6 November 1975
106	Ivory Coast	13 November 1975
107	Lesotho	14 November 1975
108	Maldives	15 November 1975
109	Nepal	25 November 1975
110	Suriname	25 November 1975
111	Botswana	5 December 1975
112	Singapore	22 December 1975
113	Cameroon	23 December 1975
114	Eswatini	23 December 1975
115	Madagascar	26 December 1975
116	Rwanda	21 January 1976
117	Cape Verde	19 February 1976
118	Uganda	20 February 1976
119	Angola	20 February 1976
120	Chad	25 February 1976
121	Gabon	10 March 1976
122	Nigeria	14 April 1976
123	Papua New Guinea	19 May 1976
124	Liberia	22 June 1976
125	Burkina Faso	30 June 1976
126	Sierra Leone	30 June 1976
127	Mauritius	30 July 1976
128	Myanmar	10 October 1976
129	Laos	29 November 1976
130	Kenya	15 March 1977
131	Mali	23 March 1977
132	Burundi	28 July 1977
133	Dominica	19 April 1979
134	Saint Lucia	17 May 1979
—	Sahrawi Arab Democratic Republic	24 October 1979
135	North Korea	4 September 1980
136	Belize	21 September 1981
137	Sudan	19 October 1982
138	Guinea-Bissau	23 March 1983
139	Antigua and Barbuda	14 September 1984
140	Zimbabwe	12 March 1985
141	Seychelles	1 June 1986
142	Vanuatu	30 October 1986
143	Mozambique	26 February 1988
144	Djibouti	22 June 1989
145	Namibia	17 April 1990
146	Saint Kitts and Nevis	31 July 1990
147	Saint Vincent and the Grenadines	31 July 1990
148	São Tomé and Príncipe	10 September 1990
149	Republic of the Congo	1990
150	Brunei	2 October 1991
151	Lithuania	5 November 1991
152	Latvia	27 November 1991
153	Estonia	5 December 1991
154	Armenia	14 January 1992
155	Belarus	14 January 1992
156	Ukraine	14 January 1992
157	Tajikistan	14 January 1992
158	Moldova	4 February 1992
159	Azerbaijan	10 February 1992
160	Uzbekistan	16 March 1992
161	Kyrgyzstan	27 March 1992
162	Turkmenistan	27 March 1992
163	Kazakhstan	13 April 1992
164	Georgia	8 June 1992
165	Slovenia	10 July 1992
—	Holy See	21 September 1992
166	Croatia	6 December 1992
167	Marshall Islands	28 January 1993
168	Eritrea	23 June 1993
169	Slovakia	1 October 1993
170	South Africa	27 October 1993
171	Liechtenstein	1 July 1994
172	Andorra	5 May 1995
173	Malawi	10 December 1998
174	Bosnia and Herzegovina	15 August 2001
175	Nauru	21 September 2001
176	Federated States of Micronesia	27 September 2001
177	North Macedonia	4 October 2001
178	Palau	17 October 2001
179	Timor-Leste	26 September 2003
180	Kiribati	13 October 2005
181	Tuvalu	27 September 2006
182	San Marino	22 May 2007
183	Montenegro	5 June 2007
184	Monaco	21 March 2008
185	Solomon Islands	26 September 2008
186	Tonga	26 September 2008
187	Comoros	13 October 2008
188	Samoa	21 October 2008
189	South Sudan	26 September 2011
190	Central African Republic	4 February 2020
—	Cook Islands	21 November 2023
—	State of Palestine	19 March 2025

== Bilateral relations ==
=== Africa ===
Country	Formal Relations Began	Notes
Algeria	October 21, 1964	See Algeria–Mexico relations: Algeria has an embassy in Mexico City.; Mexico has an embassy in Algiers.
Angola	February 20, 1976	See Angola–Mexico relations: Angola is accredited to Mexico from its embassy in Washington, D.C., United States.; Mexico is accredited to Angola from its embassy in Abuja, Nigeria and has an honorary consulate in Luanda.
Benin	1975	Benin is accredited to Mexico from its embassy in Washington, D.C., United States.; Mexico is accredited to Benin from its embassy in Abuja, Nigeria.
Botswana	December 5, 1975	Botswana is accredited to Mexico from its embassy in Washington, D.C., United States and maintains an honorary consulate in Mexico City.; Mexico is accredited to Botswana from its embassy in Pretoria, South Africa.
Burkina Faso	1976	Burkina Faso is accredited to Mexico from its embassy in Washington, D.C., United States and an honorary consulate in Mexico City.; Mexico is accredited to Burkina Faso from its embassy in Abuja, Nigeria.
Burundi	July 28, 1977	Burundi is accredited to Mexico from its embassy in Washington, D.C., United States.; Mexico is accredited to Burundi from its embassy in Nairobi, Kenya and maintains an honorary consulate Bujumbura.
Cameroon	1975	Cameroon is accredited to Mexico from its embassy in Washington, D.C., United States.; Mexico is accredited to Cameroon from its embassy in Abuja, Nigeria.
Cape Verde	1976	Cape Verde is accredited to Mexico from its embassy in Washington, D.C., United States.; Mexico is accredited to Cape Verde from its Permanent Mission to the United Nations in New York City.
Central African Republic	February 4, 2020	Both nations established diplomatic relations on February 4, 2020, in New York City, with the signing done by their respective ambassadors to the United Nations.: Central African Republic does not have an accreditation to Mexico.; Mexico is accredited to the Central African Republic from its Permanent Mission to the United Nations in New York City.
Chad	February 25, 1976	See Chad–Mexico relations Chad and Mexico established diplomatic relations on February 25, 1976. In May 2002, Chadian Prime Minister Nagoum Yamassoum paid a visit to the Mexican city of Monterrey to attend the Monterrey Consensus conference.: Chad is accredited to Mexico from its embassy in Washington, D.C., United States.; Mexico is accredited to Chad from its embassy in Cairo, Egypt.
Comoros	October 2008	The Comoros does not have an accreditation to Mexico.; Mexico is accredited to the Comoros from its embassy in Nairobi, Kenya.
Democratic Republic of the Congo	July 31, 1975	See Democratic Republic of the Congo–Mexico relations Both nations established diplomatic relations on July 31, 1975.: DR Congo does not have an accreditation to Mexico.; Mexico is accredited to DR Congo from its embassy in Addis Ababa, Ethiopia.
Republic of the Congo	1990	Republic of the Congo is accredited to Mexico from its embassy in Washington, D.C., United States.; Mexico is accredited to the Republic of the Congo from its embassy in Abuja, Nigeria.
Djibouti	June 22, 1989	Djibouti is accredited to Mexico from its embassy in Havana, Cuba.; Mexico is accredited to Djibouti from its embassy in Addis Ababa, Ethiopia and maintains an honorary consulate in Djibouti City.
Egypt	March 31, 1958	See Egypt–Mexico relations: Egypt has an embassy in Mexico City.; Mexico has an embassy in Cairo.
Equatorial Guinea	September 26, 1975	See Equatorial Guinea–Mexico relations Both nations established diplomatic relations on September 26, 1975.: Equatorial Guinea is accredited to Mexico from its embassy in Washington, D.C., United States.; Mexico is accredited to Equatorial Guinea from its embassy in Abuja, Nigeria.
Eritrea	June 23, 1993	Eritrea is accredited to Mexico from its embassy in Washington, D.C., United States.; Mexico is accredited to Eritrea from its embassy in Cairo, Egypt.
Eswatini	December 23, 1975	Eswatini (formerly known as Swaziland) is accredited to Mexico from its Permanent Mission to the United Nations in New York City.; Mexico is accredited to Eswatini from its embassy in Pretoria, South Africa.
Ethiopia	1949	See Ethiopia–Mexico relations After the Second Italo-Ethiopian War, Mexico was the only country to condemn the Italian occupation of Ethiopia at the League of Nations. Since then, relations between the two nations have strengthened. In Addis Ababa, Ethiopia thanked Mexico by naming a square in the city called "Mexico Square". Mexico named a metro station in Mexico City called Metro Etiopía.: Ethiopia is accredited to Mexico from its embassy in Washington, D.C., United States.; Mexico has an embassy in Addis Ababa.
Gabon	March 1976	Gabon is accredited to Mexico from its embassy in Washington, D.C., United States.; Mexico is accredited to Gabon from its embassy in Abuja, Nigeria.
Gambia	August 15, 1975	Gambia does not have an accreditation to Mexico.; Mexico is accredited to Gambia from its embassy in Accra, Ghana.
Ghana	August 8, 1961	See Ghana–Mexico relations Ghana and Mexico established diplomatic relations on August 8, 1961. Soon afterwards, both nations opened embassies in each other's capitals, respectively. In 1972, Ghana closed its embassy in Mexico City. Mexico closed its embassy in Accra in 1980. Mexico re-opened its embassy in Ghana in 2013.: Ghana is accredited to Mexico from its embassy in Washington, D.C., United States.; Mexico has an embassy in Accra.
Guinea	January 25, 1962	Guinea is accredited to Mexico from its embassy in Havana, Cuba.; Mexico is accredited to Guinea from its embassy in Abuja, Nigeria.
Guinea-Bissau	1975	Guinea-Bissau does not have an accreditation to Mexico.; Mexico is accredited to Guinea-Bissau from its embassy in Rabat, Morocco.
Ivory Coast	November 13, 1975	See Ivory Coast–Mexico relations: Ivory Coast has an embassy in Mexico City.; Mexico is accredited to Ivory Coast from its embassy in Rabat, Morocco and maintains an honorary consulate in Abidjan.
Kenya	March 15, 1977	See Kenya–Mexico relations: Kenya has an embassy in Mexico City.; Mexico has an embassy in Nairobi.
Lesotho	1975	Lesotho is accredited to Mexico from its embassy in Washington, D.C., United States.; Mexico is accredited to Lesotho from its embassy in Pretoria, South Africa.
Liberia	1976	Liberia is accredited to Mexico from its embassy in Washington, D.C., United States.; Mexico is accredited to Liberia from its embassy in Accra, Ghana.
Libya	August 6, 1975	See Libya–Mexico relations: Libya has an embassy in Mexico City.; Mexico is accredited to Libya from its embassy in Algiers, Algeria.
Madagascar	December 26, 1975	Madagascar is accredited to Mexico from its embassy in Washington, D.C., United States and maintains an honorary consulate in Mexico City.; Mexico is accredited to Madagascar from its embassy in Pretoria, South Africa and maintains an honorary consulate in Antananarivo.
Malawi	December 10, 1998	Malawi is accredited to Mexico from its embassy in Washington, D.C., United States.; Mexico is accredited to Malawi from its embassy in Pretoria, South Africa.
Mali	March 23, 1977	Mali is accredited to Mexico from its embassy in Washington, D.C., United States.; Mexico is accredited to Mali from its embassy in Rabat, Morocco and has an honorary consulate in Bamako.
Mauritania	June 24, 1975	Mauritania is accredited to Mexico from its embassy in Washington, D.C., United States.; Mexico is accredited to Mauritania from its embassy in Algiers, Algeria and maintains an honorary consulate in Nouakchott.
Mauritius	July 30, 1976	Mauritius is accredited to Mexico from its embassy in Washington, D.C., United States.; Mexico is accredited to Mauritius from its embassy in Pretoria, South Africa and maintains an honorary consulate in Port Louis.
Morocco	October 31, 1962	See Mexico–Morocco relations: Mexico has an embassy in Rabat and a trade office in Casablanca.; Morocco has an embassy in Mexico City.
Mozambique	February 26, 1988	See Mexico–Mozambique relations: Mexico is accredited to Mozambique from its embassy in Pretoria, South Africa.; Mozambique is accredited to Mexico from its embassy in Washington, D.C., United States.
Namibia	April 17, 1990	See Mexico–Namibia relations Mexico recognized and established diplomatic relations with Namibia on April 17, 1990. In 1993, Mexico opened an embassy in Windhoek, however, the embassy was closed in 2002.: Mexico is accredited to Namibia from its embassy in Pretoria, South Africa.; Namibia is accredited to Mexico from its embassy in Washington, D.C., United States.
Niger	November 6, 1975	Mexico is accredited to Niger from its embassy in Abuja, Nigeria.; Niger is accredited to Mexico from its embassy in Washington, D.C., United States.
Nigeria	April 14, 1976	See Mexico–Nigeria relations: Mexico has an embassy in Abuja.; Nigeria has an embassy in Mexico City.
Rwanda	January 21, 1976	Mexico is accredited to Rwanda from its embassy in Nairobi, Kenya and maintains an honorary consulate in Kigali.; Rwanda is accredited to Mexico from its embassy in Washington, D.C., United States.
Sahrawi Republic	September 8, 1979	See Mexico–Sahrawi Arab Democratic Republic relations: Mexico is accredited to the Sahrawi Republic from its Permanent Mission to the United Nations in New York City.; Sahrawi Republic has an embassy in Mexico City.
São Tomé and Príncipe	~1989	Mexico is accredited to São Tomé and Príncipe from its Permanent Mission to the United Nations in New York City.; São Tomé and Príncipe does not have an accreditation to Mexico.
Senegal	May 1962	See Mexico–Senegal relations: Mexico is accredited to Senegal from its embassy in Rabat, Morocco. and maintains an honorary consulate in Dakar.; Senegal is accredited to Mexico from its embassy in Washington, D.C., United States and maintains an honorary consulate in Mexico City.
Seychelles	1986	Mexico is accredited to the Seychelles from its embassy in Nairobi, Kenya.; Seychelles does not have an accreditation to Mexico.
Sierra Leone	1976	Mexico is accredited to Sierra Leone from its embassy in Accra, Ghana.; Sierra Leone does not have an accreditation to Mexico.
Somalia	August 5, 1975	Mexico is accredited to Somalia from its embassy in Addis Ababa, Ethiopia.; Somalia does not have an accreditation to Mexico.
South Africa	26 October 1993	See Mexico–South Africa relations There were no official relations between Mexico and South Africa before 1993. After the end of Apartheid in South Africa, the countries established relations.: Mexico has an embassy in Pretoria.; South Africa has an embassy in Mexico City.
South Sudan	September 26, 2011	Mexico is accredited to South Sudan from its embassy in Addis Ababa, Ethiopia.; South Sudan does not have an accreditation to Mexico.
Sudan	October 19, 1982	Mexico and Sudan established diplomatic relations on October 19, 1982.: Mexico is accredited to Sudan from its embassy in Cairo, Egypt and maintains an honorary consulate in Khartoum.; Sudan does not have an embassy accredited to Mexico.
Tanzania	February 19, 1973	See Mexico–Tanzania relations: Mexico is accredited to Tanzania from its embassy in Nairobi, Kenya and maintains an honorary consulate in Dar es Salaam.; Tanzania is accredited to Mexico from its embassy in Washington, D.C., United States and maintains an honorary consulate in Mexico City.
Togo	October 29, 1975	Mexico is accredited to Togo from its embassy in Abuja, Nigeria.; Togo is accredited to Mexico from its embassy in Washington, D.C., United States.
Tunisia	November 17, 1961	See Mexico–Tunisia relations: Mexico is accredited to Tunisia from its embassy in Algiers, Algeria and maintains an honorary consulate in Tunis.; Tunisia is accredited to Mexico from its embassy in Washington, D.C., United States.
Uganda	February 20, 1976	See Mexico–Uganda relations: Mexico is accredited to Uganda from its embassy in Nairobi, Kenya and maintains an honorary consulate in Kampala.; Uganda is accredited to Mexico from its embassy in Washington, D.C., United States.
Zambia	October 15, 1975	Mexico is accredited to Zambia from its embassy in Pretoria, South Africa.; Zambia is accredited to Mexico from its embassy in Washington, D.C., United States.
Zimbabwe	March 1985	See Mexico–Zimbabwe relations Mexico and Zimbabwe established diplomatic relations in March 1985. Mexico opened an embassy in Harare in 1990, however, the embassy later closed in 1994.: Mexico is accredited to Zimbabwe from its embassy in Pretoria, South Africa.; Zimbabwe is accredited to Mexico from its embassy in Washington, D.C., United States.

=== Americas ===
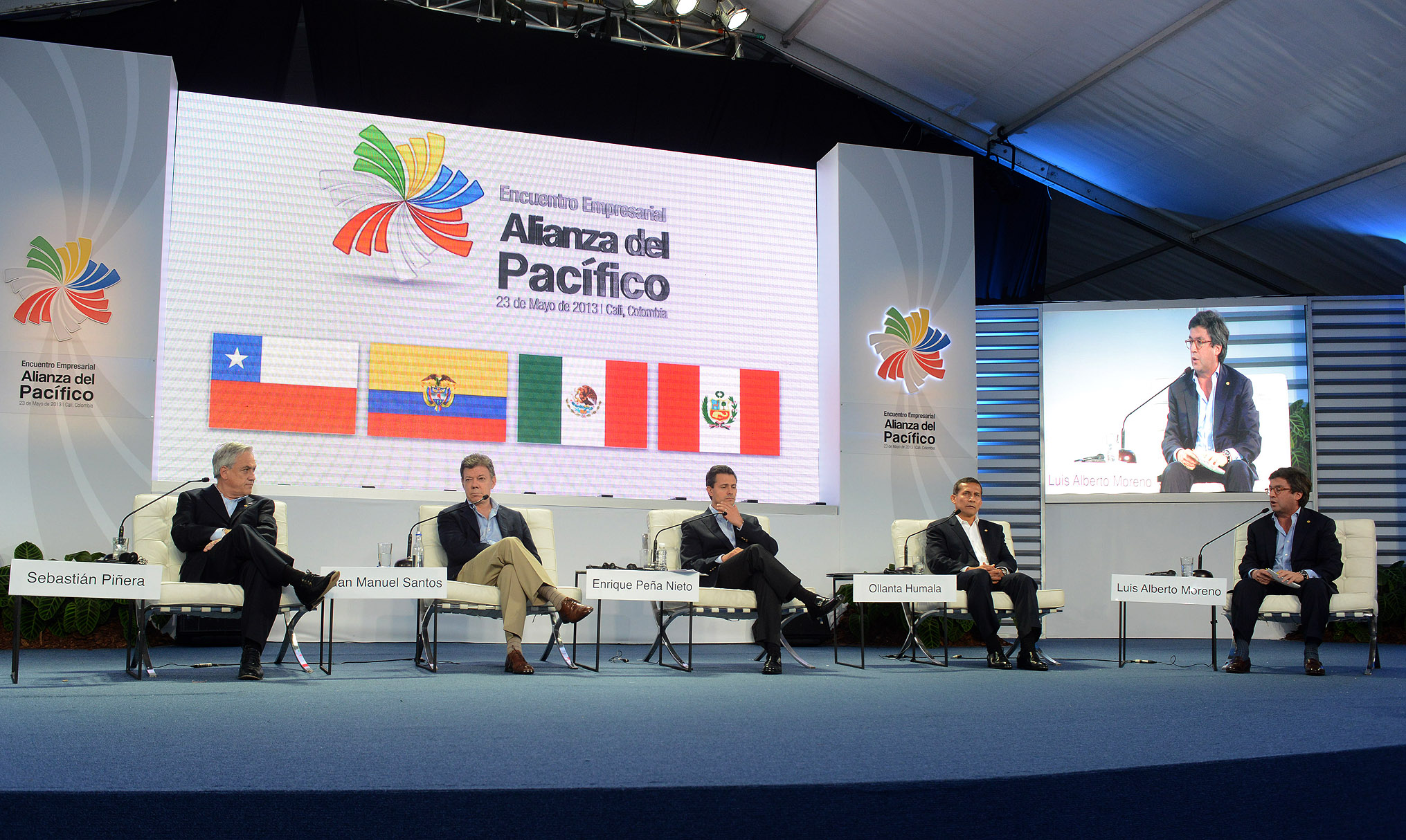
The VII Summit of the Pacific Alliance

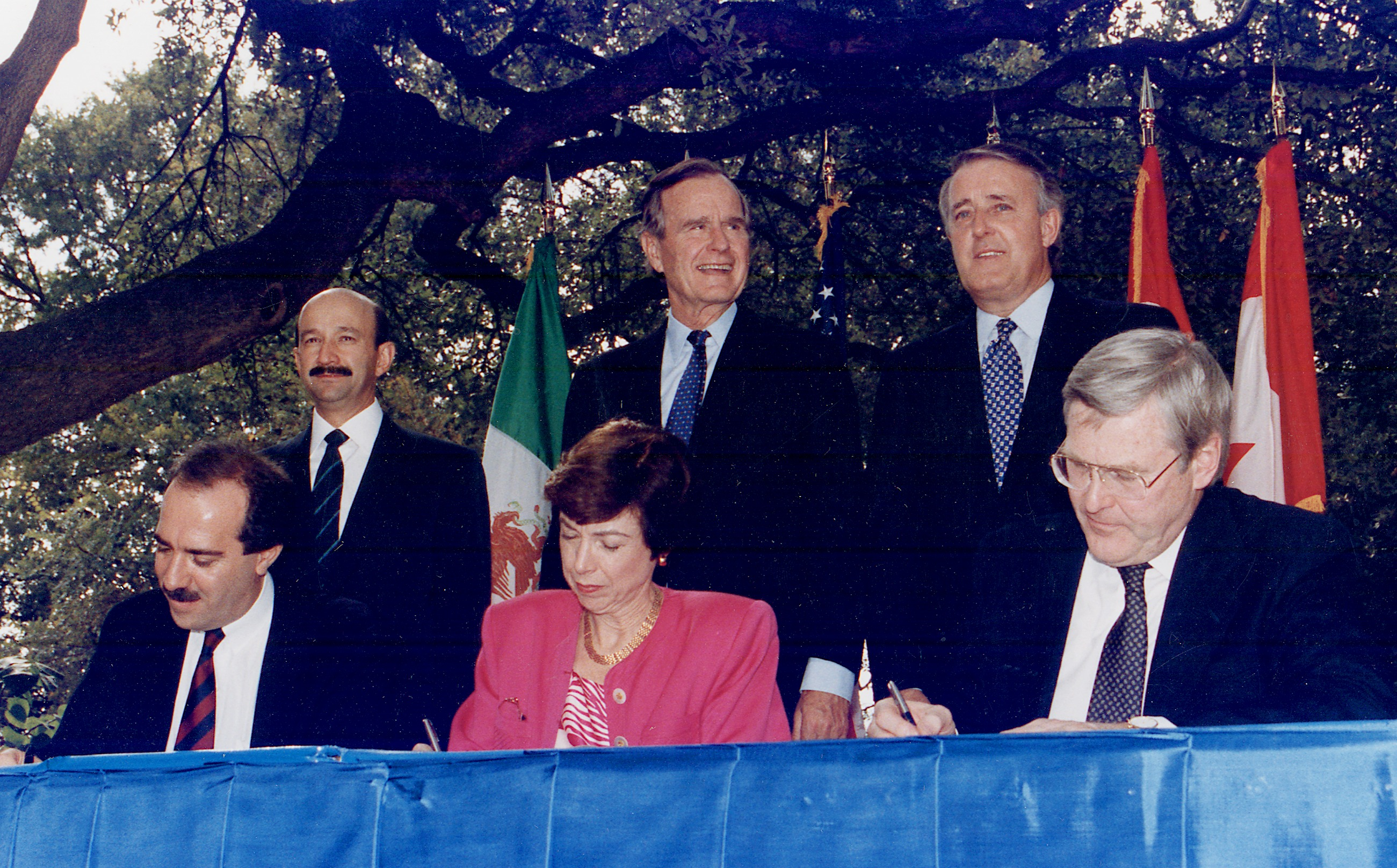
NAFTA Initialing Ceremony, October 1992. From left to right (standing) President Carlos Salinas de Gortari, President George H. W. Bush, Prime Minister Brian Mulroney. (Seated) Jaime Serra Puche, Carla Hills, Michael Wilson.

Since the North American Free Trade Agreement (NAFTA) went into effect on January 1, 1994, relations between Canada, Mexico and the United States have significantly strengthened politically, economically, socially and culturally. During the Fox administration, a further integration towards Mexico's northern neighbors was a top priority. The September 11 attacks changed the priorities of U.S. foreign policy toward the strengthening of regional security. As a result, several trilateral summit meetings regarding this issue have occurred within the framework of the Security and Prosperity Partnership of North America (SPP), a region-level dialogue with the stated purpose of providing greater cooperation on security and economic issues, founded in Waco, Texas on March 23, 2005, by Paul Martin, then-Prime Minister of Canada, Vicente Fox, then-President of Mexico, and George W. Bush, then-President of the United States.

Other issues of concern are the ones related to conservation and protection of the environment, the North American Agreement on Environmental Cooperation (NAAEC) consists of a declaration of principles and objectives concerning this issues as well as concrete measures to further cooperation on these matters tripartitely. In addition, the Independent Task Force on North America advocates a greater economic and social integration between Canada, Mexico and the U.S. as a region. It is a group of prominent business, political and academic leaders from the three countries organized and sponsored by the Council on Foreign Relations (U.S.), the Canadian Council of Chief Executives, and the Mexican Council on Foreign Relations.

Mexico is an observer of several regional organizations such as the Union of South American Nations (UNASUR), the Southern Common Market (Mercosur) and the Andean Community of Nations (CAN). Former President of Argentina Néstor Kirchner expressed, during a state visit in Mexico City, that Mexico should become a full member of Mercosur, other Latin American leaders such as Luiz Inácio Lula da Silva and Tabaré Vázquez share this vision and have extended the invitation, the latter emphasized Mexico's key role in integration of Latin America and the Caribbean and stated that:

Country	Formal Relations Began	Notes
Antigua and Barbuda	September 14, 1984	See Antigua and Barbuda–Mexico relations: Antigua and Barbuda has a non-resident ambassador accredited to Mexico from its capital in St. John's.; Mexico is accredited to Antigua and Barbuda from its embassy in Castries, Saint Lucia and maintains an honorary consulate in St. John's.
Argentina	1824	See Argentina–Mexico relations Mexican President Andrés Manuel López Obrador along with Argentine President Alberto Fernández in Iguala, Mexico; February 2021. First contacts started in 1818 with the United Provinces of South America. Due to internal conflicts in each nation, relations between Mexico and Argentina were established de jure until the 1880s when both countries officially accredited their respective representations, upgraded to embassies in 1927. On May 20, 1914, accredited diplomats from Argentina, Brazil and Chile, known as the ABC countries, met in Niagara Falls, Canada, to prevent a war between Mexico and the United States, potentially possible due to measures taken by then-U.S. President Woodrow Wilson concerning the Tampico Affair. Relations reached their lowest point during the rule of the military government in Argentina, because of the asylum provided by Mexico to Héctor Cámpora and Abal Medina. Nearly at the end of the López Portillo administration in April 1982, Argentina challenged the British government when they invaded the Falkland Islands. Mexico acknowledged the Argentine rights over the islands but condemned the use of force to solve the conflict and supported a resolution of the United Nations Security Council (UNSC) that called for an end of hostilities. In 2005, during the Fourth Summit of the Americas in Mar de Plata, Argentina, tensions between the two countries started when former President Vicente Fox canceled the anticipatively programmed bilateral reunion with then-President Néstor Kirchner. At the Summit, Fox actively promoted the Free Trade Area of the Americas (FTAA) and suggested the exclusion of those who did not agree; Argentina, Brazil and Venezuela argued that the Summit was not meant to discuss the FTAA and rejected the proposition. At the end of the ceremony, Fox expressed that "the most important countries of the Americas (Canada, Mexico and the U.S.) supported the FTAA, and the secondary ones (Cuba, Venezuela and the members of Mercosur) were against it". Later, he criticized Kirchner's interest of "pleasing the Argentine public opinion", who responded that "Fox should only care for the affairs that involve Mexico [...] and good diplomacy was not about bowing down to powerful countries". The respective Ministries of Foreign Affairs redacted a joint communiqué apologizing for the incident and reminded the "importance of the good relations for both countries". In 2007, when Kirchner paid a state visit, he and President Felipe Calderón signed a "Strategic Partnership Agreement" to strengthen bilateral ties. In recent years, both partners, along with Colombia, Italy, Pakistan, South Korea, Turkey and six other countries, developed a movement called Uniting for Consensus, nicknamed the "Coffee Club", in opposition to the possible expansion of the United Nations Security Council. Argentina and Mexico, specifically, do not support the integration of Brazil as a permanent member of the UNSC.: Argentina has an embassy in Mexico City and a consulate in Playa del Carmen.; Mexico has an embassy in Buenos Aires.; See also: Argentine immigration to Mexico
Bahamas	January 24, 1974	See Bahamas–Mexico relations: The Bahamas is accredited to Mexico from its embassy in Washington, D.C., United States.; Mexico is accredited to the Bahamas from its embassy in Kingston, Jamaica and maintains an honorary consulate in Nassau.
Barbados	September 11, 1972	See Barbados–Mexico relations: Barbados is accredited to Mexico from its embassy in Washington, D.C., United States.; Mexico is accredited to Barbados from its embassy in Port of Spain, Trinidad and Tobago and maintains an honorary consulate in Bridgetown.
Belize	1981	See Belize–Mexico relations Diplomatic relations between both nations were established in 1981 after Belize obtained independence from the United Kingdom.: Mexico has an embassy in Belmopan.; Belize has an embassy in Mexico City.; Both countries are members of the Association of Caribbean States and the Organization of American States.
Bolivia	1831	See Bolivia–Mexico relations Official visit to Mexico of the president of Bolivia, Luis Alberto Arce Catacora.: Bolivia has an embassy in Mexico City.; Mexico has an embassy in La Paz.; Both nations are full members of the Association of Spanish Language Academies, Organization of American States, Organization of Ibero-American States and Rio Group.
Brazil	August 7, 1824	See Brazil–Mexico relations Felipe Calderon and Luiz Inácio Lula da Silva, president of Brazil (right). Mexico and Brazil represent more than half of population, territory and economic development in Latin America, and have the major prestige in the region. Considered as regional powers by analysts, relations between the two countries remain good. In the economic area, both are members of the ALADI, the G8+5 and the G-20. Diplomatic relations between Mexico and Brazil were formally established in the 1820s. During the French Intervention in Mexico, and subsequent Second Mexican Empire, every Latin American country, except Guatemala and the Brazilian Empire, refused to recognize the government of Maximilian I of Mexico. In 1914, an incident occurred in the Port of Tampico that was enough to lead the U.S. to send troops to occupy the Port of Veracruz, which coincided with the provision of military aid by Germany to General Victoriano Huerta. The governments of Argentina, Brazil and Chile, that were given the term ABC countries, supported by then-U.S. President Woodrow Wilson, offered their mediation to solve the dispute peacefully. The ABC countries met in Niagara Falls, Canada to prevent a war between Mexico and the U.S. Legitimate President Venustiano Carranza refused to participate because discussions regarding the ideal form of government that should be established in Mexico took place at the Niagara Falls conferences. Followers of Carranza condemned these actions and refused to accept any foreign aid. Nonetheless, the ABC Pact of 1915 was successfully implemented during the following years. Since the 1970s, relations between Mexico and Brazil have been substantially strengthened. In October 2006, President-elect Felipe Calderón visited Brazilian President Luiz Inácio Lula da Silva, to deepen the dialogue and cooperation between the two countries. The governments of Brazil and Mexico look for maintaining an opened dialogue with several visits to strengthen the bilateral relations and allow a major exchange in areas such as non-proliferation of nuclear weapons, human rights, environment and energy. Thus the Brazil-Mexico Bilateral Commission was released in March 2007 to strengthen their relations. In August 2007, when President "Lula" da Silva paid a state visit, both leaders agreed to coordinate their foreign policies towards Latin America in order to further integrate the region. In the multilateral scene, Brazil and Mexico's actions are guided by solid principles such as respect for international law, defense of multilateralism, social justice and democratization of international relations. As noted, both countries share views internationally. However, some differences remain, being the most significant the Reform of the United Nations Security Council. Brazil and Mexico, along with India, the People's Republic of China and South Africa, often represent the interests of the developing countries through economic forums such as the G8+5 and the G-20.: Brazil has an embassy in Mexico City.; Mexico has an embassy in Brasília and consulates-general in Rio de Janeiro and São Paulo.
Canada	January 30, 1944	See Canada–Mexico relations Press conference between Canadian Prime Minister Justin Trudeau and Mexican President Enrique Peña Nieto in Ottawa; 2016. Formal relations did not begin until 1944, at the height of the Second World War, which both countries participated in on the Allied side. Prior to the negotiations around the North American Free Trade Agreement (NAFTA), economic and political ties between Mexico and Canada were relatively weak. Since NAFTA has come into force, the two countries have become much more important to each other, and often collaborate when dealing with the United States, for example with issues related to the economic embargo imposed to Cuba. Currently, Mexico and Canada are close friends and strategic partners and benefit from a very active bilateral relationship which includes ever increasing commercial ties, high-level political exchanges and an expanding collaborative network between Mexicans and Canadians in areas such as climate change, culture, energy, education, good governance, human rights and public service modernization. And more recently, both countries have been building a closer security and defense relationship. In recent years, both partners along with Italy, Argentina, Pakistan and other eight countries have sought a reform of the United Nations Security Council and its working methods Which form a group informally called the Coffee Club, that opposes to the proposition of the G4.
Chile	1821	See Chile–Mexico relations In the early 1820s, Chile and Mexico established diplomatic relations, both countries had interest of integrating the region, however, due to Mexico's economic and political instability the project did not go further. In 1914, due to the Tampico Affair, then-U.S. President Woodrow Wilson ordered the occupation of the Port of Veracruz. Once Wilson realized that his objectives had failed, he appealed to the accredited diplomats of Argentina, Brazil and Chile, known as the ABC countries, to mediate and find a peaceful solution to the international conflict preventing a war between Mexico and the U.S. Based on the principle of ideological plurality, the Mexican government actively supported the regimes of Fidel Castro in Cuba and Salvador Allende in Chile. After the coup d'état of September 11, 1973, Mexico condemned the dictatorship of General Augusto Pinochet, but did not break off diplomatic relations immediately due to the amount of Chileans seeking for asylum refuged in the Mexican embassy. Months later, then-President Luis Echeverría formally broke off diplomatic ties with Chile. Relations were reestablished in 1990 after the Chilean transition to democracy with the election of Patricio Aylwin. A Free Trade Agreement with Chile was signed in April 1998 and went into force on August 1, 1999. Since then, bilateral trade has significantly increased and exceeded the US$3.3 billion mark as of 2006. In addition, Mexico has become Chile's main Latin American investor, accumulating nearly US$870 million. Under the Fox administration, the candidacy of then-Minister of Foreign Affairs Luis Ernesto Derbez for the Secretary General of the Organization of American States was highly promoted. It eventually failed but brought a diplomatic crisis with Chile when Derbez had announced that he would no longer compete against José Miguel Insulza, however, the Mexican delegation abstained despite being previously agreed that it would vote for the Chilean candidate. Bilateral relations were raised to a new level during the state visit of President Michelle Bachelet to Mexico in March 2007, both countries put into effect a "Strategic Partnership Agreement" aimed at bolstering trade, political, diplomatic and cultural relations, as well as ties with civil society. It also creates a fund that will provide US$2 million a year for development projects in Chile, Mexico and third countries.: Chile has an embassy in Mexico City.; Mexico has an embassy in Santiago.; Both nations are part of the Pacific Alliance; See also: Chilean immigration to Mexico
Colombia	October 3, 1823	See Colombia–Mexico relations: Colombia has and embassy in Mexico City and consulates in Cancún and Guadalajara.; Mexico has an embassy in Bogotá.; Both nations are part of the Pacific Alliance; See also: Colombian Mexicans
Costa Rica	1838	See Costa Rica–Mexico relations Diplomatic relations between Mexico and Costa Rica began in 1838.: Costa Rica has an embassy in Mexico City.; Mexico has an embassy in San José.
Cuba	1902	See Cuba–Mexico relations In 1902, Mexico became the first country to ever recognize and establish relations with the Republic of Cuba once it gained full sovereignty. The cultural ties between the two nations became stronger during the following decades. In the mid-20th century, the Cuban Revolution took place, culminating with the triumph of the July 26 Movement on January 1, 1959. In 1964, when Cuba was expelled from the Organization of American States Mexico did not support this resolution and abstained. Mexico thereafter maintained diplomatic relations with Cuba, which effectively established it as the sole link between Fidel Castro and the rest of the hemisphere because none of the other Latin American governments recognized Cuba's revolutionary regime until after 1970. Since then, Mexico constantly supported Cuba in international organizations and multilateral forums, and strongly opposed to the economic embargo imposed to the Caribbean island in the early 1960s. Relations remained strong and stable until 1998 when Fidel Castro, declared that Mexican children were more knowledgeable on Disney characters than on key figures in Mexican history, such declarations led Mexico to recall its ambassador from Havana. He later apologized and said that his words were meant to underscore the cultural dominance of the U.S. On November 16, 1999, then Mexican President Ernesto Zedillo highly criticized the lack of democracy and political freedom in Cuba during his official visit to the Caribbean island. Relations worsened when then President Vicente Fox, from the National Action Party, redirected the country's Castañeda Doctrine on foreign policy. In April 2002, the UN Human Rights Commission again criticized Cuba's rights record, the resolution was sponsored by Uruguay and supported by many of countries traditionally friendly towards Cuba, such as Mexico, that historically had abstained. The same month, Fox apologized to Fidel Castro over allegations by Castro that Fox forced him at the last minute to leave the United Nations International Conference on Financing for Development in Monterrey, Mexico, in order to favor the presence of former U.S. President George W. Bush, who also attended and likely requested Castro's removal. Castro, Cuba, and even many Mexicans saw this as an insult, and relations between the two countries reached their lowest point. Under the Calderón administration, Mexico concentrated on rebuilding diplomatic relations with Havana. On December 15–17, 2008, in the framework of the "First Latin American and Caribbean Summit for Integration and Development", President Calderón introduced Cuba to the regional organization Rio Group and held talks with President Raúl Castro about topics of interests for both countries. They both agreed to schedule mutual visits for 2009, and put emphasis on strengthening the friendship, cooperation, integration, trade and support. Both countries share the vision of a permanent fight against poverty and organized crime. With seven months before the six-year term of Felipe Calderón came to an end, he made plans to visit Cuba to "patch up the bruise" and discuss possible business relations, which included oil deals. In April 2012, President Felipe Calderón traveled to Cuba and met with Raúl Castro to fix the broken relationship between the two countries. During his time in Cuba, Calderón condemned the 50-year-old U.S. trade embargo against Cuba.: Cuba has an embassy in Mexico City and consulates-general in Cancún, Mérida, Monterrey and Veracruz City.; Mexico has an embassy and consulate-general in Havana.; See also: Cuban immigration to Mexico
Dominica	April 3, 1979	See Dominica–Mexico relations: Dominica is accredited to Mexico from its embassy in Washington, D.C., United States.; Mexico is accredited to Dominica from its embassy in Castries, Saint Lucia and maintains an honorary consulate in Roseau.
Dominican Republic	July 23, 1888	See Dominican Republic–Mexico relations: Dominican Republic has an embassy in Mexico City.; Mexico has an embassy in Santo Domingo.; Both countries are members of the Association of Caribbean States, Organization of American States and the Organization of Ibero-American States.
Ecuador	1837 (Diplomatic Relations Severed 5 April 2024)	See Ecuador–Mexico relations In April 2024, Mexico severed diplomatic relations with Ecuador due to the raid on the Mexican embassy in Ecuador.
El Salvador	1838	See El Salvador–Mexico relations Diplomatic relations between Mexico and El Salvador were established in 1838.: El Salvador has an embassy in Mexico City and consulates-general in Acayucan, Ciudad Juárez , Guadalajara, Monterrey, Oaxaca City, San Luis Potosí, Tapachula, Tijuana and Villahermosa.; Mexico has an embassy in San Salvador.; Both countries are members of the Organization of American States and the Organization of Ibero-American States.; See also: Salvadoran immigration to Mexico
Grenada	April 11, 1975	See Grenada–Mexico relations: Grenada is accredited to Mexico from its embassy in Washington, D.C., United States.; Mexico is accredited to Grenada from its embassy in Castries, Saint Lucia and maintains an honorary consulate in St. George's.
Guatemala	6 September 1848	See Guatemala–Mexico relations Diplomatic relations between Mexico and Guatemala began in 1838 after the dissolution of the Federal Republic of Central America.: Guatemala has an embassy in Mexico City and consulates-general in Cancún, Monterrey, Oaxaca City, San Luis Potosí, Tapachula, Tenosique, Tijuana, and Tuxtla Gutiérrez; consulates in Acayucan, Ciudad Hidalgo, Comitán and a consular office in Arriaga.; Mexico has an embassy in Guatemala City and consulates in Flores, Quetzaltenango and in Tecún Umán.; Both countries are members of the Organization of American States, Organization of Ibero-American States and the Rio Group.; See also: Guatemalan immigration to Mexico
Guyana	March 1, 1973	See Guyana–Mexico relations: Guyana is accredited to Mexico from its embassy in Washington, D.C., United States.; Mexico has an embassy in Georgetown.
Haiti	11 July 1929	See Haiti–Mexico relations: Haiti has an embassy in Mexico City and a consulates-general in Tapachula and Tijuana.; Mexico has an embassy in Port-au-Prince.
Honduras	1879	See Honduras–Mexico relations: Honduras has an embassy in Mexico City and consulates-general in Puebla City, San Luis Potosí, Tapachula, Tijuana and Veracruz and consular agencies in Acayucan, Saltillo and Tenosique.; Mexico has an embassy in Tegucigalpa and a consulate in San Pedro Sula.
Jamaica	March 18, 1966	See Jamaica–Mexico relations: Jamaica has an embassy in Mexico City.; Mexico has an embassy in Kingston.
Nicaragua	1838	See Mexico–Nicaragua relations: Mexico has an embassy in Managua.; Nicaragua has an embassy in Mexico City.
Panama	March 1, 1904	See Mexico–Panama relations: Mexico has an embassy in Panama City.; Panama has an embassy in Mexico City and a consulate-general in Veracruz City.
Paraguay	1831	See Mexico–Paraguay relations: Mexico has an embassy in Asunción.; Paraguay has an embassy in Mexico City.
Peru	1883	See Mexico–Peru relations: Peru has a consular section in Mexico City.
Saint Kitts and Nevis	July 31, 1990	See Mexico–Saint Kitts and Nevis relations: Mexico is accredited to Saint Kitts an Nevis from its embassy in Castries, Saint Lucia and maintains an honorary consulate in Basseterre.; Saint Kitts and Nevis is accredited to Mexico from its embassy in Washington, D.C., United States.
Saint Lucia	May 17, 1979	See Mexico–Saint Lucia relations: Mexico has an embassy in Castries.; Saint Lucia is accredited to Mexico from its embassy in Washington, D.C., United States.
Saint Vincent and the Grenadines	July 31, 1990	See Mexico–Saint Vincent and the Grenadines relations: Saint Vincent and the Grenadines is accredited to Mexico from its embassy in Washington, D.C., United States.; Mexico is accredited to Saint Vincent and the Grenadines from its embassy in Castries, Saint Lucia and maintains an honorary consulate in Kingstown.
Suriname	1975	See Mexico–Suriname relations: Mexico is accredited to Suriname from its embassy in Port of Spain, Trinidad and Tobago.; Suriname is accredited to Mexico from its embassy in Washington, D.C., United States.
Trinidad and Tobago	April 30, 1966	See Mexico–Trinidad and Tobago relations: Mexico has an embassy in Port of Spain.; Trinidad and Tobago is accredited to Mexico from its embassy in Washington, D.C., United States.
United States	1821	See Mexico–United States relations U.S. President Biden and Mexican President Andrés Manuel López Obrador, November 2021. When Mexico gained its independence from Spain in 1821, the United States was the first country to recognize it. On December 12, 1822, the then-United States Secretary of State John Quincy Adams introduced José Manuel Zozoya, the first Mexican representative, to the then-U.S. president James Monroe in the White House. Through this event, the U.S. recognized de facto the independence of Mexico and the recently born Mexican Empire led by Agustín de Iturbide. However, Washington did not establish diplomatic relations formally with Mexico until 1825, naming Joel Poinsett as its representative, who had the mission of buying territory and getting trading facilities. The Mexican–American War was a conflict that sparked when the U.S. annexed Texas in 1845 and the Mexican government refused to recognize the secession of Texas which was the precursor to the annexation. The war, which began in 1846 and lasted for two years, was settled via the Treaty of Guadalupe Hidalgo which led to Mexico giving up even more of its land to the U.S., including California. Mexico further transferred some of its territories (southern Arizona and New Mexico) to the U.S. via the Gadsden Purchase in 1854. In the Reform War, that lasted from 1858 to 1861, the liberals led by Benito Juárez, were given the U.S. recognition as the legitimate government in Mexico. Meanwhile, the conservatives, headed by Comonfort, Zuloaga and Miramón, brought a European Emperor to govern the country, Maximilian I, which led to the French Intervention in 1862, violating the Monroe Doctrine, there was nothing the U.S. could do, as it was involved in its own civil war. Affecting Mexico's foreign policy, both sides, the Union and the Confederacy, were looking for international recognition as well. The Juárez administration was ideologically closer to the Union, but geographically Mexico shared a large border with the Confederacy. In 1861, the then-U.S. President Abraham Lincoln named Thomas Corwin as his minister for Mexico and instructed him to neutralize the Mexican aid given to the Confederates; he successfully achieved this mission. Once the civil war ended, then-Secretary of State William Seward declared that the French invasion in Mexico was harmful to the friendship between France and the U.S., and Washington provided financial aid to Benito Juárez, who successfully expelled the French in 1867. Lasting for seven years, the 1910 Mexican Revolution ended the rule of the dictator-president Porfirio Díaz. The war was sparked when the U.S.-supported Díaz was proclaimed the winner of the 1910 elections despite mass popular support for his rival in the election Francisco I. Madero. After the war, the various groups that made up the revolutionary forces splintered as they lost the unifying goal of unseating Díaz—leading to a civil war. The U.S. intervened in the conflict, including the involvement of the U.S. ambassador, Henry Lane Wilson, in the plotting of the 1913 coup d'état which overthrew Madero. First ladies Paloma Cordero of Mexico (left) and Nancy Reagan of the United States (right) with U.S. Ambassador to Mexico, John Gavin observing the damage done by the earthquake. The 1917 Constitution of Mexico caused several problems with the British and American transnational oil companies mainly derived from the article 27, which declares that "the wealth contained in the soil, the subsoil, the waters and seas of Mexico belongs to the Nation; the right to land ownership and to exploit the subsoil may therefore only be granted by the Nation." Due to foreign pressure, the implementation of the article was continuously ignored by the government until March 18, 1938, when then-President Lázaro Cárdenas nationalized the oil industry. PEMEX replaced the 17 Anglo-American companies, however, the country faced hard retaliations from the transnational oil companies, as well as an international boycott that could be overcome ten years later. During the Cold War, demonstrating independence from the United States, Mexico supported the Cuban government during the 1960s, the Sandinista revolution in Nicaragua during the late 1970s, and leftist revolutionary groups in El Salvador during the 1980s. The North American Free Trade Agreement (NAFTA) went into effect on January 1, 1994, which led to the elimination of tariffs and other trade barriers between Mexico and the U.S. and serves as a multilateral platform for cooperation between both countries. The agreement increased trade volume and cooperation in both countries. The free trade agreement has been increasingly opposed by Mexican and U.S. farmers, with many groups and the political left presenting that it hurts the interest of traditional, small and local farmers in both countries. Allegations of violations of labor and environmental laws have been considered by the trilateral institutions. The Bush Administration argued that NAFTA had had modest positive impacts on all three member countries, but Mexican farmers have strongly criticized the effects of the agreement as they have become overshadowed by the large corporations benefiting from NAFTA. Notable bilateral trade disputes relate to trucking, tuna, sweeteners and anti-dumping measures. Currently, the United States is the number one destination for Mexican exports. The U.S. also exports more goods into Mexico than any other country in the world. Migration, border security and trade issues have dominated the bilateral relationship in recent years. In September 2006, Congress approved the Secure Fence Act of 2006 (P.L. 109–367) to authorize the construction of a border fence and other barriers along 700 miles of the Mexico–United States border. In March 2009, Secretary of State Hillary Clinton officially visited Mexico to discuss issues of concern for both countries, specifically the ones related to drug trafficking and U.S. financial support in the Mexican drug war. Another persistent and growing problem is the international parental kidnapping of children to Mexico by non-custodial parents and family members. Mexico is the most common destination for parents that have abducted their children across international borders with the vast majority of those children coming from the United States.
Uruguay	February 22, 1831	See Mexico–Uruguay relations: Mexico has an embassy in Montevideo.; Uruguay has an embassy in Mexico City.; See also: Uruguayans in Mexico
Venezuela	1842	See Mexico–Venezuela relations Historically the two countries have had good diplomatic relations. Ever since both countries became important players in the oil industry, some competitive tensions arose, eventually leading to disputes after Mexico signed an agreement to join NAFTA. During President Vicente Fox's term, relations between the two countries became critically strained to the point of recalling one another's ambassadors. It has been clear that diplomatic ties between both countries are not indefinitely severed, in recent years numerous groups, both in Mexico and Venezuela are working to restore the diplomatic relationship between the two countries, as they are of strategic economic and cultural importance. In August 2007, after two years of diplomatic absence in either country, normal relations were re-established with the appointment of former foreign minister Roy Chaderton as Venezuela's envoy in Mexico City and the transfer of Jesús Mario Chacón Carrillo, formerly Mexican ambassador to Colombia, to Caracas. Both countries are founding members of the Latin American Integration Association.: Mexico has an embassy in Caracas.; Venezuela has an embassy in Mexico City.

=== Asia ===
Country	Formal Relations Began	Notes
Afghanistan	June 27, 1961	See Afghanistan–Mexico relations The Embassy of the Islamic Republic of Afghanistan in the United States was accredited to Mexico until it closed on March 16, 2022, in the wake of the Taliban takeover of Afghanistan. Mexico is accredited to Afghanistan from its embassy in Tehran, Iran.
Armenia	January 14, 1992	See Armenia–Mexico relations: Armenia has an embassy in Mexico City.; Mexico is accredited to Armenia from its embassy in Moscow, Russia.; Mexico has recognized the Armenian genocide in 2023.
Azerbaijan	January 14, 1992	See Azerbaijan–Mexico relations: Azerbaijan has an embassy in Mexico City.; Mexico has an embassy in Baku.
Bahrain	August 5, 1975	Bahrain is accredited to Mexico from its embassy in Washington, D.C., United States.; Mexico is accredited to Bahrain from its embassy in Riyadh, Saudi Arabia and maintains an honorary consulate in Manama.
Bangladesh	1975	See Bangladesh–Mexico relations: Bangladesh has an embassy in Mexico City.; Mexico is accredited to Bangladesh from its embassy New Delhi, India.
Bhutan		Both nations have not established diplomatic relations.
Brunei	October 2, 1991	Brunei is accredited to Mexico from its embassy in Washington, D.C.; Mexico is accredited to Brunei from its embassy in Singapore.
Cambodia	September 1976	Cambodia is accredited to Mexico from its embassy in Washington, D.C., United States.; Mexico is accredited to Cambodia from its embassy in Hanoi, Vietnam.
China	1972	See China–Mexico relations President Enrique Peña Nieto with President of China Xi Jinping Mexico and the People's Republic of China established relations amidst tensions in 1972, and in recent years have seen an intense export rivalry over the United States market, with the Mexican government having accused the Chinese of impinging on its export territory by flooding the US with cheap goods manufactured in low-wage factories. In 2005, Chinese President Hu Jintao came to Mexico promising increased investment in industries like automobile-parts manufacture and mineral exportation. In July 2008, Mexican President Felipe Calderón reciprocated with a visit to Beijing in a bid to improve bilateral trade. Nevertheless, China has focussed more on South American commodity producers such as Brazil and Chile to meet this end and fuel its chiefly-export economy.: China has an embassy in Mexico City and a consulate-general in Tijuana.; Mexico has an embassy in Beijing and a consulate-general in Guangzhou, Hong Kong, and Shanghai.; See also: Chinese immigration to Mexico
Georgia	June 8, 1992	See Georgia-Mexico relations: Georgia has an embassy in Mexico City.; Mexico is accredited to Georgia from its embassy in Ankara, Turkey
India	August 1, 1950	See India–Mexico relations Prime Minister Narendra Modi meets the president of Mexico, Claudia Sheinbaum on the sidelines of 51st G7 Summit. Under the Fox administration, several visits and bilateral meetings occurred concerning diverse areas such as economy, technology and culture. In April 2004, the "Group of Friendship Mexico-India" was established at the LIX Legislature. To promote a major rapprochement with India, then-Secretary of Foreign Affairs Luis Ernesto Derbez met with his Indian counterpart in mid-2004 in Washington, D.C., and officially visited New Delhi in August, where both ministers agreed to celebrate the IV Binational Commission, formerly suspended in 1996, with the aim of strengthening the bilateral agenda. In May 2007, India and Mexico signed the "Bilateral Investment Protection Agreement" (BIPA) to strengthen their trading relations, with proximity to the U.S., the joint ventures would enable Indian companies to increase their presence in the world's biggest market, taking advantage of Mexico's membership in the North American Free Trade Agreement (NAFTA). Relationship with India was tightened by visit of Indian prime minister Narendra Modi in 2016 June. This visit was visit of Indian prime minister after a long time of 30 years. This time Mexico also supported India to join Nuclear Suppliers Group (NSG).: India has an embassy in Mexico City.; Mexico has an embassy in New Delhi and a consulate in Mumbai.; See also: Indian immigration to Mexico
Indonesia	1953	See Indonesia–Mexico relations: Indonesia has an embassy in Mexico City.; Mexico has an embassy in Jakarta.
Iran	October 15, 1964	See Iran–Mexico relations Mexican First Lady Carmen Romano and President José López Portillo accompanying Iranian Queen Consort Tadj ol-Molouk in Mexico City; 1978. The first diplomatic relations between Mexico and Persia (modern-day Iran) date back to 1889, although cooperation and trade between the two friend nations was not formally established until 1937. Mexico and Iran have enjoyed increasingly close political and economic relations over the years, growing with the volume of bilateral trade and economic cooperation. The two countries aim to expand cooperation in several sectors, sharing science and technology, particularly in the oil industry. Both countries have also shared successful experiences in cultural cooperation and exchange. In 2008, an agreement to form a Mexico-Iran parliamentary friendship group was made at the Mexican parliament.: Iran has an embassy in Mexico City.; Mexico has an embassy in Tehran.
Iraq	September 25, 1950	See Iraq–Mexico relations: Iraq has an embassy in Mexico City.; Mexico is accredited to Iraq from its embassy in Abu Dhabi, United Arab Emirates.
Israel	January 1950	See Israel–Mexico relations Mexico recognized the State of Israel in January 1950. In 2000, a free trade agreement was signed between the two nations.: Israel has an embassy in Mexico City.; Mexico has an embassy in Tel Aviv.; See also: Judaism in Mexico
Japan	1888	See Japan–Mexico relations President Enrique Peña Nieto and Prime Minister Shinzō Abe at a press conference during an official visit to Japan by President Peña Nieto in April 2013. The Treaty of Amity, Commerce and Navigation concluded in 1888 between the two countries was Japan's first "equal" treaty with a foreign country. In 1897, the 35 members of the so-called Enomoto Colonization Party settle in the Mexican state of Chiapas to grow coffee, this was the first organized emigration from Japan to Latin America. Former Mexican President Álvaro Obregón was awarded Japan's Order of the Chrysanthemum at a special ceremony in Mexico City. On November 27, 1924, Baron Shigetsuma Furuya, Special Ambassador from Japan to Mexico, conferred the honor on Obregón. It was reported that this had been the first time that the Order had been conferred outside the Imperial family. In 1952, Mexico becomes the second country to ratify the San Francisco Peace Treaty, preceded only by the United Kingdom. On September 17, 2004, Mexico and Japan signed a free trade agreement, formally known as the "Agreement Between Japan and the United Mexican States for the Strengthening of the Economic Partnership", which went into effect in April 2005. This was one among many historic steps led by Prime Minister Junichiro Koizumi to strengthen global economic stability. As a result, in 2007 Mexico became Japan's largest trading partner in Latin America. Over sixty treaties and agreements have been signed between the two countries, standing out the ones related to technological and scientific cooperation, several academic and cultural exchanges, as well as an increasing inter-parliamentary dialogue. Mexico currently enjoys very good social and economic relations with Japan and is major center of Japanese investment. Japan has invested heavily in the Mexican industrial, automotive, technology and manufacturing sectors. As of 2012, it was estimated that Japanese companies employed over one million workers in Mexico just in the automotive and technology manufacturing industries.: Japan has an embassy in Mexico City and a consulate-general in León.; Mexico has an embassy in Tokyo.; See also: Japanese immigration to Mexico
Jordan	July 9, 1975	See Jordan–Mexico relations: Jordan has an embassy in Mexico City.; Mexico has an embassy in Amman.
Kazakhstan	January 14, 1992	See Kazakhstan–Mexico relations: Kazakhstan has an embassy in Mexico City.; Mexico is accredited to Kazakhstan from its embassy in Ankara, Turkey and maintains an honorary consulate in Almaty.
Kuwait	July 23, 1975	See Kuwait–Mexico relations: Kuwait has an embassy in Mexico City.; Mexico has an embassy in Kuwait City.
Kyrgyzstan	January 14, 1992	Kyrgyzstan is accredited to Mexico from its embassy in Washington, D.C., United States.; Mexico is accredited to Kyrgyzstan from its embassy in Tehran, Iran.
Laos	September 9, 1976	Laos is accredited to Mexico from its embassy in Washington, D.C.; Mexico is accredited to Laos from its embassy in Hanoi, Vietnam.
Lebanon	June 12, 1945	See Lebanon–Mexico relations Mexico was among the first nations to recognize Lebanon's independence in 1943. Mexico was a popular destination during the Lebanese diaspora. There is a significant population of Lebanese descent in Mexico, nearing half a million people, many of which travel to and support business with Lebanon. The Centro Libanés and "Club Deportivo Libanés" in Mexico City are important symbols representing the historically cultural and social ties between both countries.: Lebanon has an embassy in Mexico City.; Mexico has an embassy in Beirut.; See also: Lebanese immigration to Mexico
Malaysia	March 27, 1974	See Malaysia–Mexico relations Relations between the two countries were established on March 27, 1974.: Malaysia has an embassy in Mexico City.; Mexico has an embassy in Kuala Lumpur.
Maldives	November 15, 1975	Maldives does not have an accreditation to Mexico.; Mexico is accredited to the Maldives from its embassy in New Delhi, India.
Mongolia	September 24, 1975	See Mexico–Mongolia relations In October 2001, Mexican President Vicente Fox paid an official visit to Mongolia.: Mexico is accredited to Mongolia from its embassy in Seoul, South Korea and maintains an honorary consulate in Ulaanbaatar.; Mongolia is accredited to Mexico from its embassy in Washington, D.C., United States and maintains an honorary consulate in Mexico City.
Myanmar	October 1976	Mexico is accredited to Myanmar from its embassy in Singapore.; Myanmar is accredited to Mexico from its Permanent Mission to the United Nations in New York City.
Nepal	1975	Mexico is accredited to Nepal from its embassy in New Delhi, India and maintains an honorary consulate in Kathmandu.; Nepal is accredited to Mexico from its embassy in Washington, D.C., United States and maintains an honorary consulate in Mexico City.
North Korea	September 4, 1980	See Mexico–North Korea relations: The Democratic People's Republic of Korea has an embassy in Mexico City.; Mexico is accredited to the Democratic People's Republic of Korea from its embassy in Seoul, Republic of Korea.
Oman	July 31, 1975	See Mexico–Oman relations: Mexico is accredited to Oman from its embassy in Riyadh, Saudi Arabia and maintains an honorary consulate in Muscat.; Oman is accredited to Mexico from its embassy in Washington, D.C., United States and maintains an honorary consulate in Mexico City.
Pakistan	January 19, 1955	See Mexico–Pakistan relations: Mexico is accredited to Pakistan from its embassy in Tehran, Iran and has honorary consulates in Karachi and Lahore.; Pakistan has an embassy in Mexico City.
Palestine	1975	See Mexico–Palestine relations: Mexico has a representative office in Ramallah.; Palestine has an embassy in Mexico City.
Philippines	April 14, 1953	See Mexico–Philippines relations Mexico and the Philippines share a myriad of traditions and customs derived from historical ties established over 460 years ago. Their common history dates back to the time when both countries were part of New Spain. Mexican money financed the expedition known as Legazpi exploration, under the command of King Philip II of Spain. During the Mexican administration of the Philippines, other than General Legazpi, all of the governor-generals were born in Mexico. Due to the grand exchange with the Philippines in those days, many cultural traits were adopted by one another, with Mexicans remaining in the Philippines, and Filipinos establishing in Mexico, particularly the central west coast, near the port town of Acapulco. Many Nahuatl words were adopted and popularized in the Philippines, such as Tianggui (market fair) and Zapote (a fruit). After the colonial period, the first official contacts of Mexico with the Philippines were established in 1842, when a Mexican Representation was opened in Manila. With the assignment of Mexican Diplomat Evaristo Butler Hernandez in the Philippines in 1878. The Independence of the Philippines brought forth a new era of relations between these countries. Mexico dispatched an envoy to participate in the festivities to celebrate the birth of the Southeast Asian nation. Diplomatic ties between both countries were formalized on April 14, 1953. The year of 1964 was decreed the "Year of Philippine-Mexican Friendship" to celebrate the Fourth Centennial of the Expedition of Miguel López de Legazpi. In modern day, the conquest of the Philippines is seen as a Spanish initiative, while Mexico is viewed as a country of historical link and friendship, and several groups intend on strengthening the bond between the two countries.: Mexico has an embassy in Manila.; Philippines has an embassy in Mexico City.; See also: Filipino immigration to Mexico
Qatar	June 30, 1975	See Mexico–Qatar relations: Mexico has an embassy in Doha.; Qatar has an embassy in Mexico City.
Saudi Arabia	September 12, 1952	See Mexico–Saudi Arabia relations: Mexico has an embassy in Riyadh.; Saudi Arabia has an embassy in Mexico City.; See also: Islam in Mexico
Singapore	August 9, 1965	See Mexico–Singapore relations: Mexico has an embassy in Singapore.; Singapore has an embassy in Mexico City.
South Korea	January 26, 1962	See Mexico–South Korea relations: The Republic of Korea has an embassy in Mexico City.; Mexico has an embassy in Seoul.; See also: Koreans in Mexico
Sri Lanka	April 19, 1960	See Mexico–Sri Lanka relations: Mexico is accredited to Sri Lanka from its embassy in New Delhi, India and maintains an honorary consulate in Colombo.; Sri Lanka is accredited to Mexico from its embassy in Washington, D.C., United States and maintains an honorary consulate in Mexico City.
Syria	August 20, 1950	See Mexico–Syria relations Mexico and Syria established diplomatic relations on August 20, 1950.: Mexico is accredited to Syria from its embassy in Cairo, Egypt.; Syria does not have an embassy accredited to Mexico.
Taiwan	1972	See Mexico–Taiwan relations: Mexico has a liaison office in Taipei known as the "Mexican Trade Services, Documentation and Cultural Office".; Taiwan has a liaison office in Mexico City known as the "Taipei Economic and Cultural Office in Mexico" (Oficina Económica y Cultural de Taipei en México).
Tajikistan	January 14, 1992	Mexico is accredited to Tajikistan from its embassy in Tehran, Iran.; Tajikistan is accredited to Mexico from its Permanent Mission to the United Nations in New York City, United States.
Thailand	August 28, 1975	See Mexico–Thailand relations: Mexico has an embassy in Bangkok.; Thailand has an embassy in Mexico City.
Timor-Leste	September 26, 2003	See Mexico–Timor-Leste relations: Timor-Leste is accredited to Mexico from its embassy in Washington, D.C., United States.; Mexico is accredited to Timor-Leste from its embassy in Jakarta, Indonesia and maintains an honorary consulate in Dili.
Turkey	1927	See Mexico–Turkey relations: Mexico has an embassy in Ankara and a consulate in Istanbul.; Turkey has an embassy in Mexico City.; Both countries are members of OECD, G20 and WTO.; Flights from Istanbul to Mexico City and Cancún were launched in August 2019.; Trade volume between the two countries was 1,3 billion USD USD in 2019 (Mexican exports/imports: 678/602 million USD.; Yunus Emre Institute has a local headquarters in Mexico City.
Turkmenistan	1992	Mexico is accredited to Turkmenistan from its embassy in Ankara, Turkey.; Turkmenistan is accredited to Mexico from its embassy in Washington, D.C., United States.
United Arab Emirates	September 12, 1975	See Mexico–United Arab Emirates relations Diplomatic relations between Mexico and the United Arab Emirates began on September 12, 1975.: Mexico has an embassy in Abu Dhabi.; United Arab Emirates has an embassy in Mexico City.
Uzbekistan	January 14, 1992	Mexico is accredited to Uzbekistan from its embassy in Tehran, Iran.; Uzbekistan is accredited to Mexico from its Permanent Mission to the United Nations in New York City, United States.
Vietnam	1975	See Mexico–Vietnam relations: Mexico has an embassy in Hanoi.; Vietnam has an embassy in Mexico City.
Yemen	March 2, 1976	Mexico is accredited to Yemen from its embassy in Riyadh, Saudi Arabia and maintains an honorary consulate in Sanaa.; Yemen is accredited to Mexico from its embassy in Washington, D.C., United States.

=== Europe ===
Mexico was the first Latin American country to sign a partnership agreement with the European Union (EU), in 1997, composed by 15 members at the time. The agreement entered into force in July 2000 and has considerably strengthened bilateral relations between the two partners. It governs all relations between them, including a regular high-level political dialogue, and shared values such as democracy and human rights.

Country	Formal Relations Began	Notes
Albania	October 15, 1974	See Albania–Mexico relations Mexico recognized and established diplomatic relations with Albania on October 15, 1974. Shortly thereafter Mexico opened a resident embassy in Tirana, however the embassy was closed in 1979.: Albania is accredited to Mexico from its embassy in Washington, D.C., USA.; Mexico is accredited to Albania from its embassy in Rome, Italy and has an honorary consulate in Tirana.
Andorra	May 5, 1995	See Andorra–Mexico relations: Andorra is accredited to Mexico from its embassy based in New York City.; Mexico is accredited to Andorra from its embassy in Madrid, Spain and maintains an honorary consulate in Andorra la Vella.
Austria	July 30, 1842	See Austria–Mexico relations During the French intervention in Mexico and subsequently the Second Mexican Empire between 1864 and 1867; with French backing, Maximilian I of Mexico, member of Austria's Imperial Habsburg-Lorraine family was proclaimed Emperor of Mexico. In 1938, Mexico became the only country to protest against the anschluss of Austria at the League of Nations. During World War II, Austria was part of the German Reich and in May 1942 Mexico declared war on Germany after the destruction of two Mexican oil tankers in the Gulf of Mexico by German U-boats. After the war, normal relations were restored between the two nations. As of 2005, Mexico was Austria's second most important trade partner in Latin America. The same year, the President of Austria Heinz Fischer visited Mexico and Brazil, the first ever state visit of an Austrian President to countries in Latin America.: Austria has an embassy in Mexico City.; Mexico has an embassy in Vienna.
Belarus	January 1992	See Belarus–Mexico relations Belarus and Mexico established diplomatic relations in 1992.: Belarus is accredited to Mexico from its embassy in Havana, Cuba and maintains an honorary consulate in Mexico City.; Mexico is accredited to Belarus from its embassy in Moscow, Russia and maintains an honorary consulate in Minsk.
Belgium	1836	See Belgium–Mexico relations In 1836, Belgium—itself newly independent—recognized the independence of Mexico. In 1919, the Belgian chamber of commerce of Mexico was established. Belgium opened its embassy in Mexico on June 5, 1954.: Belgium has an embassy in Mexico City.; Mexico has an embassy in Brussels.
Bosnia and Herzegovina	August 15, 2001	Bosnia and Herzegovina is accredited to Mexico from its embassy in Washington, D.C., United States.; Mexico is accredited to Bosnia and Herzegovina from its embassy in Belgrade, Serbia.
Bulgaria	January 6, 1938	See Bulgaria–Mexico relations: Bulgaria has an embassy in Mexico City.; Mexico is accredited to Bulgaria from its embassy in Budapest, Hungary and maintains an honorary consulate in Sofia.
Croatia	December 6, 1992	See Croatia–Mexico relations: Croatia is accredited to Mexico from its embassy in Washington, D.C., USA and has an honorary consulate in Mexico City.; Mexico is accredited to Croatia from its embassy in Budapest, Hungary and has honorary consulates in Split and Zagreb.
Cyprus	February 21, 1974	See Cyprus–Mexico relations: Cyprus does not have an accreditation to Mexico.; Mexico is accredited to Cyprus from its embassy in Athens, Greece and maintains an honorary consulate in Nicosia.
Czech Republic	1922	See Czech Republic–Mexico relations: Czech Republic has an embassy in Mexico City.; Mexico has an embassy in Prague.; See also: Czech immigration to Mexico
Denmark	1827	See Denmark–Mexico relations: Denmark is Mexico's largest investor and trade partner among the Nordic countries. Diplomatic relations began in 1827 with a Treaty of Friendship, Trade and Navigation.; Denmark has an embassy in Mexico City.; Mexico has an embassy in Copenhagen.
Estonia	January 28, 1937	See Estonia–Mexico relations: Estonia is accredited to Mexico from its embassy in Washington, D.C., United States and maintains honorary consulates in Mexico City and in Tampico.; Mexico is accredited to Estonia from its embassy in Helsinki, Finland and maintains an honorary consulate in Tallinn.
Finland	November 11, 1949	See Finland–Mexico relations: Finland has an embassy in Mexico City.; Mexico has an embassy in Helsinki.
France	November 26, 1826	See France–Mexico relations Peña Nieto at the Élysée Palace with French President Emmanuel Macron, 2017. The independence of Mexico was recognized de jure by France until 1830. The first official contacts concerned trading, in 1827 an agreement signed in Paris established that both countries and its citizens would enjoy a privileged position reciprocally, which included complaints and demands related to the damages suffered during the war from French citizens living in Mexico, the Mexican Congress refused to ratify it. then-French Foreign Minister Louis-Mathieu Molé sent an ultimatum urging the Mexican government to pay off its debts, due to economic instability, refused to do so. In 1838, a French pastry cook, Monsieur Remontel, claimed his shop in the Tacubaya district of Mexico City had been ruined by looting Mexican officers in 1828, he appealed to French King Louis-Philippe. Coming to its citizen's aid, France demanded MXN$600,000 in damages. When the payment was not forthcoming from then-President Anastasio Bustamante, Louis-Philippe sent a fleet to declare a blockade of all Mexican ports from Yucatán Peninsula to the Rio Grande, and to seize the Port of Veracruz, which led to an armed conflict known as the Pastry War. British diplomat Richard Pakenham offered his mediation, after several negotiations, Mexico was eventually forced to pay the initially demanded MXN$600,000 and burdensome compensations. In 1861, the liberals won the War of Reform, however, it left the treasury depleted. Trade was stagnant, and foreign creditors were demanding full repayment of Mexican debts, Juárez proceeded to declare a moratorium on all foreign debt repayments. France, Great Britain and Spain decided to launch a joint occupation of the Mexican Gulf coast to force repayment. The Spanish and British quickly figured out that Juárez fully intended to pay the debts when he could, so they withdrew. They also realized that the French had other intentions, indicated by the arrival of reinforcements, and had no desire to help France achieve its ambitions, which led to a military intervention, encouraged by the defeated conservatives. When the French entered Mexico City in mid-1863, the conservatives quickly invited Archduke Ferdinand Maximilian of Austria to accept the Mexican crown, who agreed believing that this act responded to the desire of a majority of Mexicans. However, once the conservatives understood Maximilian's democratic sentiments and anticlerical attitudes, began withdrawing their support. When the American Civil War ended, the U.S. made its Monroe Doctrine valid and intervened by providing military and financial aid to Juárez. Meanwhile, in Europe, France was increasingly threatened by a belligerent Prussia and, by 1866, Napoleon III began recalling his troops stationed in Mexico. Conservative forces switched sides and began supporting the Mexican liberals. United resumed their campaign on February 19, 1867, and on May 15, Maximilian surrendered. He was tried and, on Juárez's orders, was executed on June 19. After an exhaustive process, diplomatic relations were reestablished in 1880, leaving behind claims related to the war. Emmanuel Macron, Enrique Peña Nieto and José Ángel Gurría at the G20 Leaders Summit 2017. Both nations had an international dispute over the island of Clipperton, which had been under Mexican occupation, but claimed by the Foreign Ministry of France. In 1931 both nations agreed to abide to the arbitration of King Victor Emmanuel III of Italy, who declared it a French territory. When the Fourth Republic collapsed in 1958, Mexico was the first country that recognized the Fifth Republic founded by General Charles de Gaulle. In subsequent years, both countries coordinated actions and released a communiqué that supported the Farabundo Martí National Liberation Front (FMLN) during the Salvadoran Civil War. Recently, President Nicolas Sarkozy paid a state visit in March 2009, however, controversy over the Florence Cassez case, a Frenchwoman convicted of kidnapping in Mexico sentenced to 60 years in jail, overshadowed the bilateral agenda. Backed by the "Convention on the Transfer of Sentenced Persons", Sarkozy persuaded the Mexican government to allow Cassez to serve out her sentence in France, however, public opinion in Mexico strongly opposes under the suspicion that once home, she would quickly be released from jail. A bilateral commission was established to handle the case. Meanwhile, speaking at the National Palace in Mexico City, Sarkozy praised Calderón for Mexico's "courageous and determined" battle against drug cartels and urged the Congress to reform the Constitution in order to allow the Mexican military to collaborate with the United Nations in peacekeeping missions. Supported by British Prime Minister Gordon Brown, Sarkozy has previously expressed that the G8 would benefit from a permanent enlargement that includes the +5 countries.: France has an embassy in Mexico City and a consulate-general in Monterrey.; Mexico has an embassy in Paris and a liaison office in Strasbourg.; See also: French immigration to Mexico
Germany	1823	See Germany–Mexico relations Gerhard Schröder in Los Pinos with President Fox. Alexander von Humboldt's reports on his trip to then-New Spain back in the early 19th century heralded the start of Germany's interest in Mexico. Commercial links were quickly established through the signing of the "Treaty of Commerce and Navigation" between Mexico and Hamburg in 1823. Due to increasing investment, six years later, Prussia sent Carl Koppe as its first general consul and first representative in the newborn nation. During the administration of dictator Porfirio Díaz, commercial ties significantly strengthened. In January 1917, Britain's secret Royal Navy cryptanalytic group, Room 40, intercepted a proposal from Berlin, the Zimmermann Telegram, to Mexico to join the Great War as Germany's ally against the United States, should the U.S. join. The proposal suggested, if the U.S. were to enter the war, Mexico should declare war against the U.S. and enlist Japan as an ally. This would prevent the U.S. from joining the Allies and deploying troops to Europe, and would give Germany more time for their unrestricted submarine warfare program to strangle Britain's vital war supplies. In return, the Germans would promise Mexico support in reclaiming Texas, New Mexico and Arizona. When the U.S. entered the war on April 2, 1917, eleven days later then-President Venustiano Carranza not only turned down the proposition but also declared neutrality. Nearly 25,000 Mennonites of German ancestry immigrated from Canada to Mexico and settled in the states of Chihuahua and Durango in 1922, their agricultural centers still contribute to the economy of the region. After the establishment of Nazi Germany, Mexico received hundreds of asylum seekers, standing out important figures such as Egon Erwin Kisch, Anna Seghers and Paul Westheim. During the Second World War, the Axis powers sank two Mexican oil tankers such as Faja de Oro and Potrero de Llano, despite Mexico's neutrality. This attacks were enough to make Mexico enter the world conflict. In 1952, diplomatic relations between the two countries were officially reestablished. In 1964, the foundation of Volkswagen in Puebla, Mexico, best represents the foreign investment from Germany; specifically, the Volkswagen Beetle, informally called "vocho", is commonly seen as a symbol of Germany in the country. In contemporary times, Germany is viewed as a privileged partner in Europe, from whom economic, political and cultural engagement in Mexico is expected. Bilateral relations are being intensified in all areas based on a "Joint Declaration" between the two countries' Foreign Ministries signed in April 2007. Economic ties have been strengthened since the European Union-Mexico Free Trade Agreement went into force in July 2000, Germany has become Mexico's fourth-largest trading partner.: Germany has an embassy in Mexico City.; Mexico has an embassy in Berlin, a consulate in Frankfurt and a trade office in Munich.; See also: German immigration to Mexico
Greece	May 17, 1938	See Greece–Mexico relations: Greece has an embassy in Mexico City.; Mexico has an embassy in Athens.; See also: Greek immigration to Mexico
Holy See	1992	See Holy See–Mexico relations: Mexico's President Benito Juárez, expelled the Apostolic Nuncio to Mexico in 1861, breaking off diplomatic relations.; In 1904 the Holy See assigned an Apostolic Delegate to Mexico. Diplomatic relations were restored in 1992, giving the office of the Apostolic Delegate in Mexico City the status of a nunciature. As of 2012 about 78% of Mexico's population declared themselves Roman Catholics.; Holy See has an Apostolic Nunciature in Mexico City.; Mexico has a resident embassy to the Holy See in Rome.
Hungary	1864	See Hungary–Mexico relations Diplomatic relations between Hungary and Mexico were suspended between 1941 and 1974 and re-established on May 14, 1974. The Mexican embassy in Budapest was opened on September 30, 1976.: Hungary has an embassy in Mexico City.; Mexico has an embassy in Budapest.
Iceland	1960	See Iceland–Mexico relations: Iceland is accredited to Mexico from its embassy in Washington, DC, United States.; Mexico is accredited to Iceland from its embassy in Copenhagen, Denmark.
Ireland	August 21, 1975	See Ireland–Mexico relations: Ireland has an embassy in Mexico City.; Mexico has an embassy in Dublin.; See also: Irish immigration to Mexico and Saint Patrick's Battalion
Italy	December 15, 1874	See Italy–Mexico relations The first contact between Italy and Mexico was in 1869, just before the end of Italian unification in 1870; when Italy expressed its desire to open a consulate in Mexico. A consulate was opened in Mexico in December 1872, however, diplomatic relations between the two nations were not established until December 15, 1874. During World War I, Mexico remained neutral because it was involved in its own revolution during the same time. In the 1930s, diplomatic relations between the two nations began to deteriorate when Prime Minister Benito Mussolini invaded and annexed Abyssinia (now Ethiopia) during the Second Italo-Ethiopian War in 1935–1936. Mexico was one of the few countries to vehemently oppose the occupation of Abyssinia by Italian forces. On May 22, 1942, Mexico declared war on the axis powers due to German u-boat attacks on two Mexican oil tankers in the Gulf of Mexico that same year. Diplomatic relations were re-established on June 1, 1946. In 1997, Mexico signed a Free Trade Agreement with the European Union (which includes Italy). Trade between the two nations totaled just over six billion USD in 2011. Among the products that Mexico exports to Italy are: automobiles and petroleum based products. Italy exports mainly steel products to Mexico. Today, Italy is Mexico's ninth biggest trading partner in the world (third in Europe after Germany and Spain). Mexico is Italy's second biggest trading partner in Latin-America (after Brazil).: Italy has an embassy in Mexico City.; Mexico has an embassy in Rome and a consulate-general in Milan.; See also: Italian immigration to Mexico
Latvia	November 27, 1991	See Latvia–Mexico relations: Latvia is accredited to Mexico from its embassy in Washington, D.C., United States, and maintains an honorary consulate in Mexico City.; Mexico is accredited to Latvia from its embassy in Stockholm, Sweden and maintains an honorary consulate in Riga.
Liechtenstein	July 1, 1994	Liechtenstein does not have an embassy accredited to Mexico.; Mexico is accredited to Liechtenstein from its embassy in Berne, Switzerland and maintains an honorary consulate in Vaduz.
Lithuania	November 5, 1991	See Lithuania–Mexico relations Lithuania and Mexico initially established diplomatic relations on May 31, 1938, and signed a Treaty of Friendship in Washington, D.C., United States. Mexico never recognized the annexation of Lithuania by the Soviet Union and condemned the action. On November 5, 1991, Mexico recognized and re-established diplomatic relations with Lithuania. In 2002, President Valdas Adamkus paid a visit to Mexico and met with Mexican President Vicente Fox. In 2008, President Adamkus returned to Mexico for a visit and met with Mexican President Felipe Calderón.: Lithuania is accredited to Mexico from its embassy in Washington, D.C., United States, and maintains an honorary consulate in Mexico City.; Mexico is accredited to Lithuania from its embassy in Stockholm, Sweden and maintains an honorary consulate in Vilnius.
Luxembourg	1947	See Luxembourg–Mexico relations Diplomatic relations between Luxembourg and Mexico were established in 1947. In 1980, Prime Minister Pierre Werner paid an official visit to Mexico. In March 1996, Grand Duke Jean paid a visit to Mexico. During the Grand Duke's visit, both nations signed an Air Transportation Agreement. In April 2019, Prime Minister Xavier Bettel paid an official visit to Mexico and met with President Andrés Manuel López Obrador.: Luxembourg is accredited to Mexico from its embassy in Washington, D.C., United States and maintains an honorary consulate in Mérida.; Mexico is accredited to Luxembourg from its embassy in Brussels, Belgium and maintains an honorary consulate in Luxembourg City.
Malta	October 29, 1975	Mexico is accredited to Malta from its embassy in Rome, Italy and maintains an honorary consulate in Valletta.; Malta is accredited to Mexico from its Ministry of Foreign Affairs in Valletta.
Montenegro	June 5, 2007	Mexico is accredited to Montenegro from its embassy in Belgrade, Serbia.; Montenegro is accredited to Mexico from its embassy in Washington, D.C., United States.
Moldova	January 14, 1992	Mexico is accredited in Moldova from its embassy in Bucharest, Romania and maintains an honorary consulate in Chișinău.; Moldova is accredited to Mexico from its embassy in Washington, D.C., United States.
Monaco	1881	See Mexico–Monaco relations: Mexico is accredited to Monaco from its embassy in Paris, France and maintains an honorary consulate in Monaco.; Monaco has an honorary consulate in Mexico City.
Netherlands	1827	See Mexico–Netherlands relations Official visit of Mexican President Enrique Peña Nieto to the Netherlands; 2018. On September 27, 1993, The Netherlands – Mexico Tax Treaty and Protocol began. This explained how "in order to be exempt from, or obtain a refund of, the Mexican withholding taxes on dividends, interest and royalties." In 2008, there was an update.: Mexico has an embassy in The Hague.; Netherlands has an embassy in Mexico City.
North Macedonia	October 4, 2001	Mexico is accredited to North Macedonia from its embassy in Belgrade, Serbia and maintains an honorary consulate in Skopje.; North Macedonia is accredited to Mexico from its embassy in Washington, D.C., United States.
Norway	1906	See Mexico–Norway relations: Mexico has an embassy in Oslo.; Norway has an embassy in Mexico City.
Poland	February 26, 1928	See Mexico–Poland relations: Mexico has an embassy in Warsaw.; Poland has an embassy in Mexico City.; See also Polish immigration to Mexico
Portugal	October 20, 1864	See Mexico–Portugal relations Mexican President Enrique Peña Nieto on a state visit to Portugal meeting with Portuguese President Aníbal Cavaco Silva; 2014.: Mexico has an embassy in Lisbon.; Portugal has an embassy in Mexico City.; See also: Portuguese immigration to Mexico
Romania	July 20, 1935	See Mexico–Romania relations: Mexico has an embassy in Bucharest.; Romania has an embassy in Mexico City.
Russia	1890	See Mexico–Russia relations Vladimir Putin and Ernesto Zedillo, at the Millennium Summit, 2000. Diplomatic relations between both countries were established in 1890. In 2010 the 120th anniversary of the ties of friendship between the peoples of Russia and Mexico were celebrated. Mexico was the first country in the Americas to establish relations with the then Union of Soviet Socialist Republics. Soviet politician and leader Leon Trotsky moved to Mexico from Norway during his exile. Mexican President Lázaro Cárdenas welcomed him warmly, arranging a special train to bring him to Mexico City from the port of Tampico. In Mexico, Trotsky at one point lived at the home of the painter Diego Rivera, and at another at that of Rivera's wife & fellow painter, Frida Kahlo with whom he had an affair. Due to its good relations with Russia, Mexico has often purchased military equipment from Russia. The Mexican Navy has received BTR-60's Ural-4320, Mi-17/8's, and anti-aircraft missiles SA-18 Grouse. Much of this equipment remains in service.: Mexico has an embassy in Moscow.; Russia has an embassy in Mexico City.; See also: Russian immigration to Mexico
San Marino	March 8, 1968	Mexico is accredited to San Marino from its embassy in Rome, Italy and maintains an honorary consulate in the City of San Marino.; San Marino is accredited to Mexico from its Ministry of Foreign Affairs in San Marino.
Serbia	1946	See Mexico–Serbia relations: Mexico has an embassy in Belgrade.; Serbia has an embassy in Mexico City.
Slovenia	1992	See Mexico–Slovenia relations Mexico was the first Latin American country to recognize Slovenia after gaining independence on May 22, 1992. Mexican parliament members have praised Slovenia's participation in the eight-country initiative (which includes Mexico) for a world without nuclear weapons and its achievements in the human rights area. Since 1999 both countries have abolished visas as an example of strengthening relations.: Mexico is accredited to Slovenia from its embassy in Vienna, Austria.; Slovenia is accredited to Mexico from its embassy in Washington, D.C., United States.
Slovakia	January 1, 1993	See Mexico–Slovakia relations In November 2017, Slovak President Andrej Kiska paid an official visit to Mexico.: Mexico is accredited to Slovakia from its embassy in Vienna, Austria and maintains an honorary consulate in Bratislava.; Slovakia has an embassy in Mexico City.
Spain	December 26, 1836	See Mexico–Spain relations Mexican President Andrés Manuel López Obrador and Spanish Prime Minister Pedro Sánchez in Mexico City; January 2019. After the Spanish conquest of the Aztec Empire was successfully archived in 1521, Mexico became part of the Spanish Empire as the Viceroyalty of New Spain, which lasted until 1821 when the Kingdom of Spain officially recognized the independence of Mexico by signing the Treaty of Córdoba. Ferdinand VII never gave his approval to the treaty signed by Juan O'Donojú, until he died in 1833, serious negotiations started to formalize the independence, the "Treaty of Peace and Friendship" was signed on December 28, 1836. The first decades of Mexico's post-independence period were characterized by economic instability. On July 17, 1861, then-President Benito Juárez's suspension of interest payments to foreign countries angered Mexico's major creditors: Spain, France and Great Britain. Napoleon III was the leader of this operation, and the three powers signed the Treaty of London on October 31 to unite their efforts to receive payments from Mexico. On December 8 the Spanish fleet and troops from Spanish-controlled Cuba arrived at Mexico's main Gulf port, Veracruz. Spain along Great Britain soon withdrew after the signing of the "Treaty of La Soledad", France did not agree with the terms and immediately invaded Mexico. During the Spanish–American War, Mexico remained neutral to avoid conflicts with the United States and Spain, despite previously having negotiated the eventual annexation of Cuba with Washington. In 1936, the Cárdenas administration declared, in the League of Nations, that "Spain was a victim of foreign aggression and had the right of moral and diplomatic support from the international community". The government decided to openly support the republican forces during the Spanish Civil War. Once the war finished in 1939, Mexico received nearly 30,000 asylum seekers and immediately broke off diplomatic relations with the "Spanish State" under the rule of dictator Francisco Franco. Since their re-establishment on March 28, 1977, have been strengthened within a modern, legal and institutional framework to promote politic dialogue and cooperation. In January 1990, the "General Treaty of Cooperation and Friendship" was signed to establish a Bilateral Commission. In 2007, President Calderón and Spanish President José Luis Rodríguez Zapatero paid state visits reciprocally and signed a declaration to deepen the strategic association between the two countries. After the European Union-Mexico Free Trade Agreement went into force in July 2000, Spain became Mexico's seventh trading partner and second amongst the European Union members.: Mexico has an embassy in Madrid and a consulate-general in Barcelona.; Spain has an embassy in Mexico City and consulates-general in Guadalajara and Monterrey.; See also: Spanish immigration to Mexico
Sweden	July 29, 1885	See Mexico–Sweden relations: Mexico has an embassy in Stockholm.; Sweden has an embassy in Mexico City.
Switzerland	1827	See Mexico–Switzerland relations: Mexico has an embassy in Bern.; Switzerland has an embassy in Mexico City.
Ukraine	January 12, 1992	See Mexico–Ukraine relations: Mexico has an embassy in Kyiv.; Ukraine has an embassy in Mexico City.
United Kingdom	September 26, 1826	See Mexico–United Kingdom relations Mexico established diplomatic relations with the United Kingdom on 26 December 1826.: Mexico has an embassy in London.; United Kingdom has an embassy in Mexico City, and a consulate general in Cancún.; Both countries share common membership of CPTPP, the G20, the International Criminal Court, the OECD, and the World Trade Organization. Bilaterally the two countries have a Double Taxation Convention, an Investment Agreement, and a Trade Continuity Agreement. Additionally the two countries are negotiating a Free Trade Agreement. Due to rivalry with France and Spain, then-Prime Minister George Canning was interested in recognizing the independence of the newborn nations in the Americas. On June 27, 1824, Canning received Mexican plenipotentiary minister José Mariano Michelena and recognized Mexico as an independent country de facto, and formally on December 30, despite opposition from the British cabinet. United Kingdom was the first country to officially recognize the independence of Mexico. In subsequent decades, the United Kingdom would persuade other European countries to recognize Mexico, especially Spain, and offer mediation in different international conflicts that involved Mexico in the 19th century such as the Pastry War and the Texas War of Independence. By 1861, Mexico was a country deeply in debt and torn by divisions of the power of the Roman Catholic Church. Mexico's creditors demanded repayment, forcing then-President Benito Juárez to declare a two-year moratorium on foreign debt, which in turn led to a punitive expedition sent by Britain, France and Spain. Juarez successfully negotiated the "Treaty of La Soledad" with the British and Spanish, who soon withdrew. After the Mexican Congress ratified a commercial agreement with the U.S. in 1883, Great Britain showed more interest in reestablish diplomatic relations with Mexico, and quickly did so a couple of years later. Sovereignty over the territory of Belize was historically claimed by Mexico, but the British crown refused to discuss this issue for a long time; however, in 1897, the signing of the "Mariscal-Spencer Treaty" resolved the territorial disputes with the British crown colony. In 1917, Mexico's newly promulgated Constitution provided, among other things, restrictions on foreign ownership of land and subsoil resources, notably oil. This last provision, included in Article 27, was ominous for American and British investors who had obtained oil-mining concessions. Due to heavy foreign pressure, subsequent governments did not strictly applicate the article, until Lázaro Cárdenas, who on March 18, 1938, fully nationalized the oil-industry. This measure led to protests by the British government questioning the nationalization and Mexico's solvency to execute it. In response, a check, in an amount worth of the demands for nationalization, was sent and diplomatic ties were broken off. PEMEX replaced the 17 Anglo-American companies, however, the country faced hard retaliations from the transnational oil companies, and an international boycott that could be overcome ten years later. Decades later, several state visits would be reciprocally paid, notably Queen Elizabeth II of the United Kingdom in 1975. On March 31 – April 1, 2009, President Felipe Calderón officially visited the UK to discuss issues related to modernization of the national oil industry, climate change and strategic cooperation with Prime Minister Gordon Brown, as well as coordinating actions for the G-20 London Summit.: See also: British immigration to Mexico and Cornish diaspora

=== Oceania ===
Country	Formal Relations Began	Notes
Australia	March 14, 1966	See Australia–Mexico relations Diplomatic relations between Mexico and Australia began on March 14, 1966.: Australia has an embassy in Mexico City.; Mexico has an embassy in Canberra.; Both countries are full members of APEC, G-20 and the OECD.
Fiji	August 31, 1975	See Fiji–Mexico relations: Fiji is accredited to Mexico from its embassy in Washington, D.C., United States.; Mexico is accredited to Fiji from its embassy in Canberra, Australia.
Kiribati	October 13, 2005	Kiribati does not have an accreditation to Mexico.; Mexico is accredited to Kiribati from its embassy in Kuala Lumpur, Malaysia.
Marshall Islands	January 28, 1993	Marshall Islands does not have an accreditation to Mexico; Mexico is accredited to the Marshall Islands from its embassy in Manila, Philippines.
Micronesia	September 27, 2001	Mexico is accredited to the Federated States of Micronesia from its embassy in Manila, Philippines.; Micronesia does not have an accreditation to Mexico.
Nauru	September 21, 2001	Mexico is accredited to Nauru from its embassy in Kuala Lumpur, Malaysia.; Nauru does not have an accreditation to Mexico.
New Zealand	1973	See Mexico–New Zealand relations New Zealand Prime Minister John Key on an official visit to Mexico alongside Mexican President Enrique Peña Nieto; 2013. Diplomatic relations between Mexico and New Zealand began in 1973.: Mexico has an embassy in Wellington.; New Zealand has an embassy in Mexico City.; Both countries are members of APEC and the OECD.
Palau	October 17, 2001	Mexico is accredited to Palau from its embassy in Manila, Philippines.; Palau does not have an accreditation to Mexico.
Papua New Guinea	May 19, 1976	See Mexico–Papua New Guinea relations: Mexico is accredited to Papua New Guinea from its embassy in Canberra, Australia.; Papua New Guinea is accredited to Mexico from its embassy in Washington, D.C., United States.
Samoa	October 21, 2008	Mexico is accredited to Samoa from its embassy in Wellington, New Zealand and maintains an honorary consulate in Apia.; Samoa does not have an accreditation to Mexico.
Solomon Islands	September 26, 2008	Mexico is accredited to the Solomon Islands from its embassy in Canberra, Australia.; Solomon Islands does not have an accreditation to Mexico.
Tonga	September 26, 2008	Mexico is accredited to Tonga from its embassy in Wellington, New Zealand.; Tonga is accredited to Mexico from its Permanent Mission to the United Nations in New York City.
Tuvalu	September 27, 2006	Mexico is accredited to Tuvalu from its embassy in Wellington, New Zealand.; Tuvalu does not have an accreditation to Mexico.
Vanuatu	October 30, 1986	Mexico is accredited to Vanuatu from its embassy in Canberra, Australia.; Vanuatu does not have an accreditation to Mexico.

== Multilateral relations ==
=== United Nations ===
Mexico is the tenth largest contributor to the United Nations (UN) regular budgets. Currently, it is a member of eighteen organizations arisen from the General Assembly, Economic and Social Council and other specialized organizations of the UN.

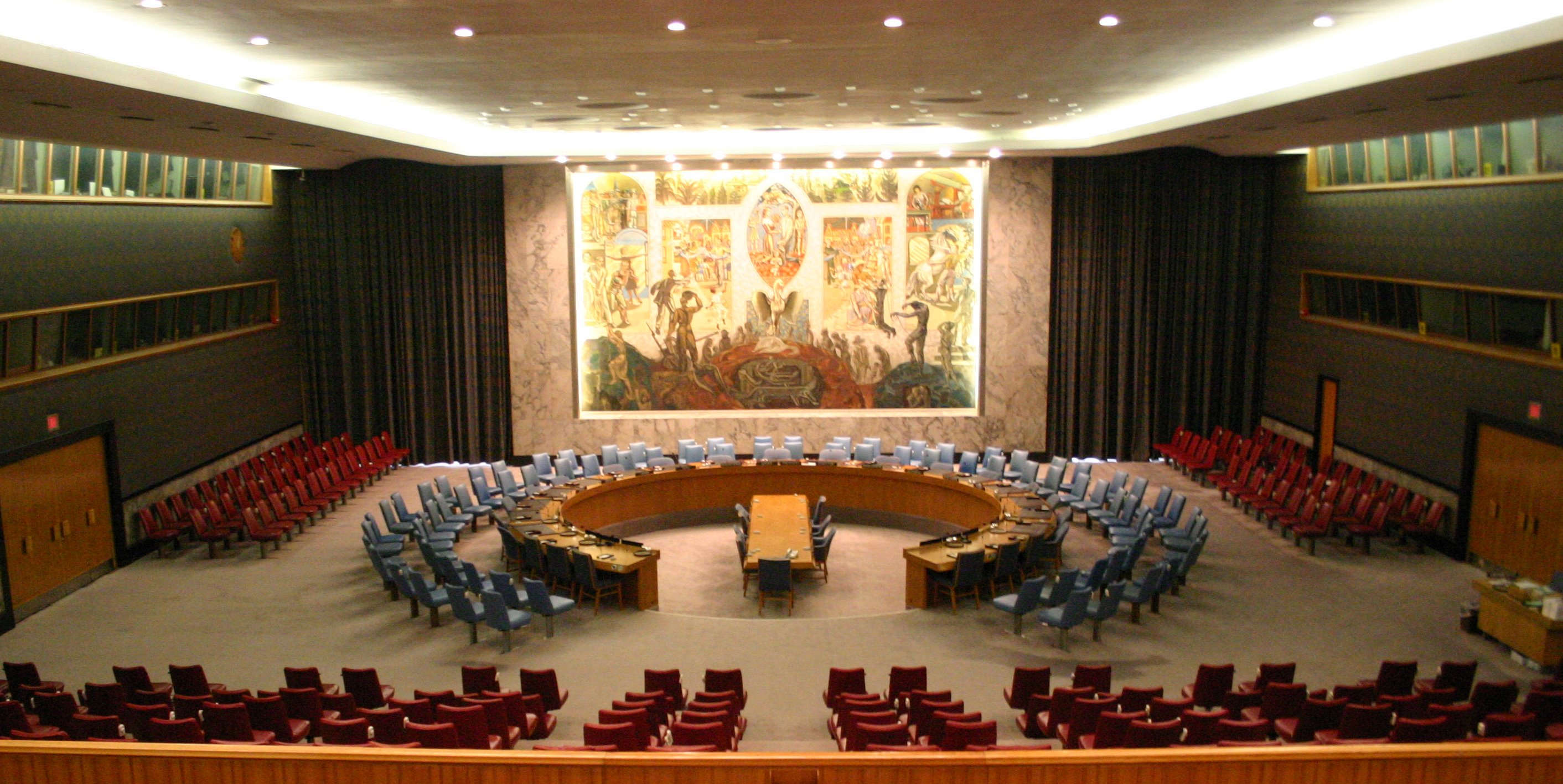
The United Nations Security Council.

Mexico has served as a non-permanent member of the United Nations Security Council (UNSC) three times (1946, 1982–83, 2002–03). On October 17, 2008, picking up 185 votes, it was elected to serve as a non-permanent member for the fourth time, from January 1, 2009, to December 31, 2010. Since April 1, Mexico holds the rotative presidency of the UNSC.

In recent years, the need of reforming the UNSC and its working methods has been widely impulsed by Mexico, with the support of Canada, Italy, Pakistan and other nine countries. And have formed a movement informally called the Coffee Club, created in the 1990s, which highly opposes to the reform that the Group of Four (G4) suggests.

In line with the Castañeda Doctrine of new openness in Mexico's foreign policy, established in the early first decade of the 21st century, some political parties have proposed an amendment of the Constitution in order to allow the Mexican army, air force or navy to collaborate with the UN in peacekeeping missions.

=== Organization of American States ===
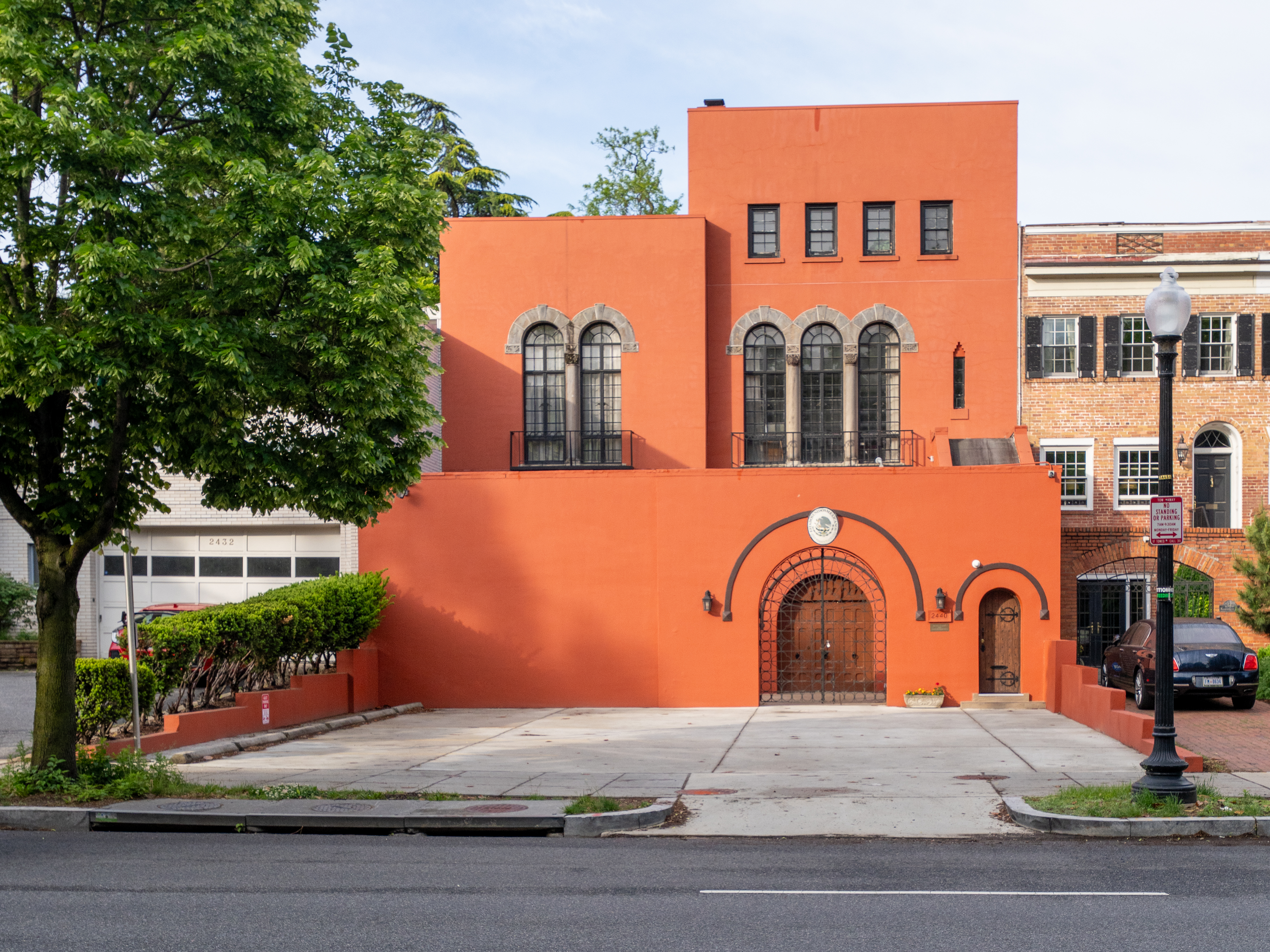
Mexican Permanent Mission to the Organization of American States (OAS) in Washington, D.C..

As a founding member of the Organization of American States (OAS), Mexico has actively participated in the intergovernmental organization. Since the creation of the OAS, Mexico always promoted to include more principals related to international cooperation and less military aspects, its position was based on the principles of non-intervention and the pacific resolution of disputes. In addition, Mexico favored the membership of Canada in 1989 and Belize and Guatemala in 1991.

In 1964, under U.S. pressure, the OAS required all member countries to break off diplomatic ties with Cuba. Mexico refused, condemned the Bay of Pigs invasion, and did not support the expulsion of Cuba from the OAS. Years later, Mexico strongly opposed to the creation of a military alliance within the OAS framework, and condemned the U.S. invasion of Panama in 1989.

Under the Fox administration, the candidacy of then-Secretary of Foreign Affairs Luis Ernesto Derbez for the Secretary General of the OAS was highly promoted. It eventually failed but brought a diplomatic crisis with Chile and harsh critics from the Mexican public opinion when Derbez had announced that he would no longer compete against José Miguel Insulza but the Mexican delegation abstained despite being previously agreed that it would vote for the Chilean candidate.

=== Mega-Diverse Countries ===
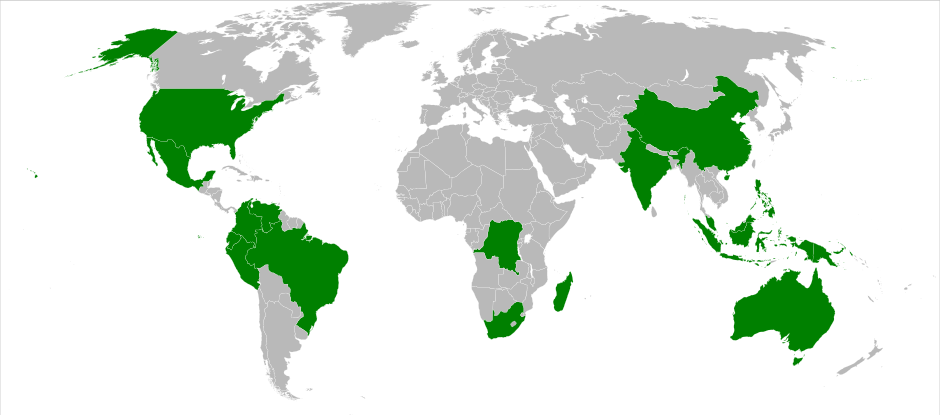
The 17 countries identified as Megadiverse by CI.

The megadiverse countries are a group of countries that harbor the majority of the Earth's species and are considered extremely biodiverse and therefore are of utmost priority on the global environmental agenda. Conservation International identified 17 megadiverse countries in 1998, most are located in or have territories in the tropics.

In 2002, Mexico formed a separate organization named Like-Minded Megadiverse Countries, consisting of countries rich in biological diversity and associated traditional knowledge. This organization includes a different set of involved megadiverse countries than those identified by Conservation International.

=== Participation in international organizations ===
Regional Organizations

- ALADI
- CAN (Observer)
- CELAC
- IDB
- LAC-EU
- LAES
- LAIA
- Latin American and Caribbean Integration and Development
- LAPR
- Ibero-American Summit
- Mercosur (Observer)
- OAS
- OEI
- OPANAL
- Rio Group
- SICA (Observer)
- Summits of the Americas
- UNASUR (Observer)
- UNECLAC

International and Multilateral Organizations

- APEC
- CCW
- CD
- Codex Alimentarius Commission
- ECOSOC
- FAO
- G8+5
- G15
- G20
- G20+
- Group of Megadiverse Countries
- GL-MMC
- IBRD
- ICRC
- ICC
- ILO
- IMF
- IOM
- IPCC
- IPU
- IRENA
- ITC
- Interpol
- ITU
- Latin American Integration Association
- Latin Union
- NAM (Observer)
- UN
- UNAIDS
- UNOCHA
- UNCTAD
- UNDIR
- UNEO
- UNEP
- UNESCO
- UNHCR
- UNITAR
- UNRISD
- UNWTO
- UPU
- World Bank
- WHO
- WIPO
- WMO
- WSIS
- WTO

== Free trade areas and agreements ==
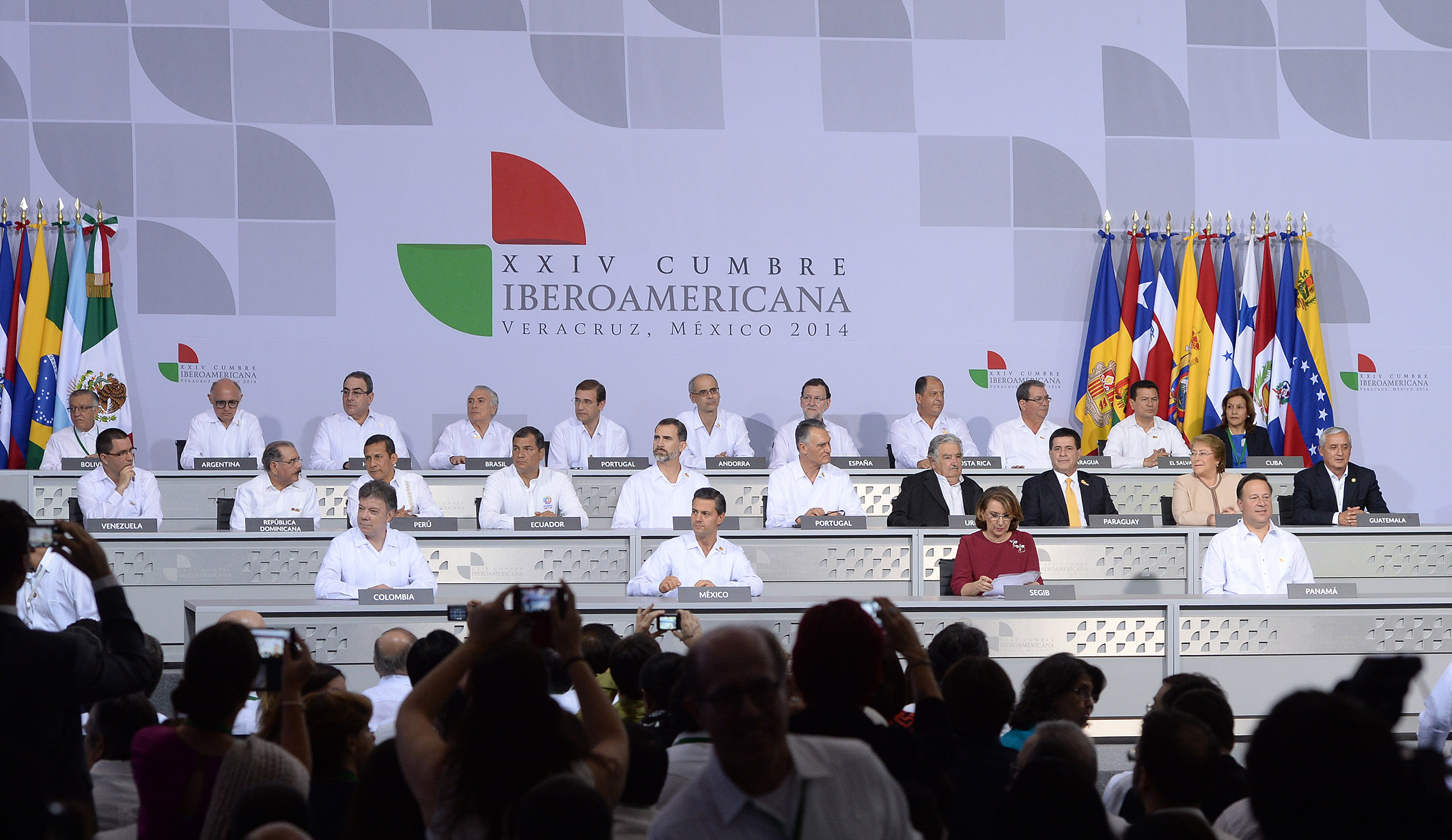
The Ibero-American Summit, in Veracruz, 2014.

Mexico was one of the original signatories of the 1960 Treaty of Montevideo, which instituted the Latin American Free Trade Association (LAFTA). One of the main goals of LAFTA was the creation of a free trade area encompassing all of Latin America. The proposed free trade area ultimately failed to come together. Beginning in 1980, LAFTA was reorganized into the Latin American Integration Association (ALADI), with the long-term goal of creating a Latin American single market.

Mexico participated in the discussions for the creation of the Free Trade Area of the Americas (FTAA), an economic integration initiative proposed by the United States and aiming to include all sovereign states in the Americas (except for Cuba). Negotiations for FTAA stalled after the 4th Summit of the Americas in 2005.

A more successful regional initiative is the Pacific Alliance, an economic integration mechanism signed by Chile, Colombia, Mexico, and Peru in 2012. The Pacific Alliance initiative aims to consolidate a free trade area between the member states.

In addition to the above, Mexico has concluded free trade agreements (FTAs) encompassing approximately 55 countries from the Americas, Europe, Asia, and Oceania. Ordered by whether the agreement was entered into as a single nation or as part of a trade bloc, and also by date, the agreements Mexico has entered into include:

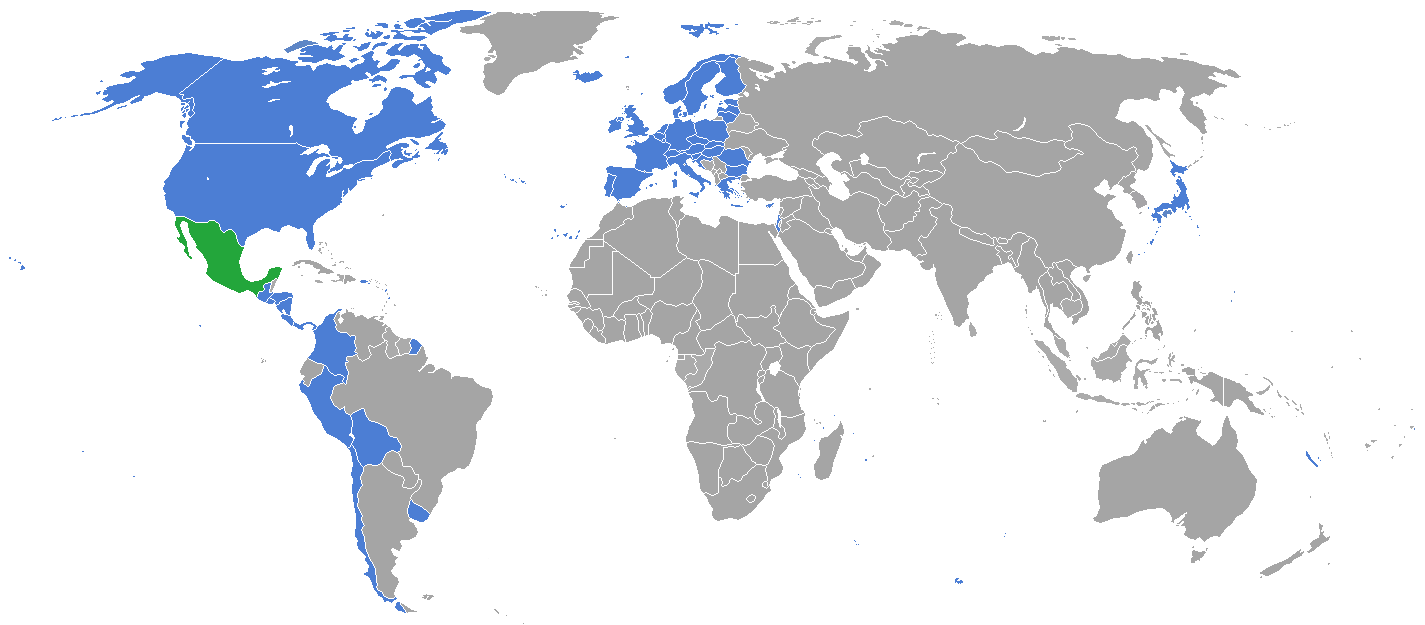
Mexico free trade agreements

=== Entered as a single nation ===
- 1994: North American Free Trade Agreement (no longer in effect).^{1}
- 1995: G3 Free Trade Agreement.^{2}
- 1995: Free Trade Agreement with Bolivia (no longer in effect).^{3}
- 1995: Free Trade Agreement with Costa Rica.^{4}
- 1998: Free Trade Agreement with Nicaragua.^{4}
- 1999: Free Trade Agreement with Chile.
- 2000: Free Trade Agreement with the European Union.
- 2000: Free Trade Agreement with Israel.
- 2001: Free Trade Agreement with the Northern Triangle.^{4}
- 2001: Free Trade Agreement with the European Free Trade Association.
- 2004: Free Trade Agreement with Uruguay.
- 2005: Agreement for the Strengthening of the Economic Partnership with Japan.
- 2011: Unifying Free Trade Agreement with Central America.^{5}
- 2012: Free Trade Agreement with Peru.
- 2014: Free Trade Agreement with Panama.
- 2016: Trans-Pacific Partnership Agreement (never entered into force).^{6}
- 2018: Comprehensive and Progressive Agreement for Trans-Pacific Partnership.^{6}
- 2018: United States–Mexico–Canada Agreement.^{7}
- 2020: Trade Continuity Agreement with the United Kingdom.^{8}

1: Superseded by the United States–Mexico–Canada Agreement after the latter's entry into force on July 1, 2020.
2: Renamed to Mexico-Colombia Free Trade Agreement after the withdrawal of Venezuela in 2006.
3: The Bolivian government denounced the Mexico-Bolivia Free Trade Agreement's provisions on investments, services, intellectual property, and government purchases as incompatible with its 2009 constitution on June 7, 2010. In order to maintain free movement of goods between Mexico and Bolivia, the governments of the two countries agreed to replace the free trade agreement with an Economic Complementation Agreement effective on the same date.
4: Superseded by the Mexico-Central America Free Trade Agreement (2011).
5: The Mexico-Central America Free Trade Agreement, which was signed in November 2011, unified the provisions of already existing free trade agreements between Mexico on one side, and Costa Rica, Nicaragua, and the Northern Triangle countries on the other.
6: The Trans-Pacific Partnership Agreement (TPPA) was signed in February 2016 between twelve countries from the Americas, Asia, and Oceania, but never entered into force after the United States' withdrawal in January 2017. The other eleven TPPA signatories signed the revised Comprehensive and Progressive Agreement for Trans-Pacific Partnership (CPTPP) in March 2018. The CPTPP entered into force for Mexico in December 2018.
7: The United States-Mexico-Canada Agreement replaced the North American Free Trade Agreement from 1994 upon the former's entry into force on July 1, 2020.
8: The United Kingdom (UK) left the European Union on January 31, 2020. Under the terms of the Brexit withdrawal agreement, trade relations between Mexico and the UK continued to be bound by the terms of the Mexico-EU trade agreement for the duration of the UK's withdrawal transition period. On December 15, 2020, in preparation for the UK's final EU withdrawal on December 31, the UK and Mexico signed a temporary Trade Continuity Agreement in order to maintain free trade between the two countries. Negotiations between Mexico and the UK for a new free trade agreement to replace the existing continuity agreement began in July 2022. These negotiations were described as 'discontinued' in a research paper commissioned by the UK Parliament and published in December 2025.

=== Entered as part of a trade bloc ===
- 2022: Pacific Alliance-Singapore Free Trade Agreement (2022).

1:As of December 2025, Mexico still has to ratify the free trade agreement signed between the Pacific Alliance and Singapore.

=== Proposed agreements ===
This section lists countries with which Mexico has formally begun negotiations for a bilateral free trade agreement in the past, but an agreement has still to be signed:

=== Proposed bilateral agreements ===
- Brazil
- Ecuador
- Jordan
- Paraguay
- Singapore^{1}
- South Korea
- Turkey
- United Kingdom^{2}

1:Mexico and Singapore are both parties to the Comprehensive and Progressive Agreement for Trans-Pacific Partnership, and have signed the Pacific Alliance-Singapore Free Trade Agreement (the latter of which is pending ratification by Mexico). However, as of January 2026 no bilateral FTA has been signed between the two countries.
2: Mexico has a Trade Continuity Agreement with the United Kingdom and ratified the latter's admission into the Comprehensive and Progressive Agreement for Trans-Pacific Partnership in December 2025. However, negotiations for a free trade agreement to replace the existing bilateral continuity agreement have been discontinued.

=== Proposed trade bloc agreements ===
- Pacific Alliance-Canada free trade agreement.

== Transnational issues ==
=== Illicit drugs ===
Mexico remains a transit and not a cocaine production country. Methamphetamine and cannabis production do take place in Mexico and are responsible for an estimated 80% of the methamphetamine on the streets in the United States, while 1,100 metric tons of marijuana are smuggled each year from Mexico.

In 1990 just over half the cocaine imported into the U.S. came through Mexico, by 2007 that had risen to more than 90 percent, according to U.S. State Department estimates. Although violence between drug cartels has been occurring long before the war began, the government used its police forces in the 1990s and early first decade of the 21st century with little effect. That changed on December 11, 2006, when newly elected President Felipe Calderón sent 6,500 federal troops to the state of Michoacán to put an end to drug violence there. This action is regarded as the first major retaliation made against cartel operations, and is generally viewed as the starting point of the war between the government and the drug cartels. As time progressed, Calderón continued to escalate his anti-drug campaign, in which there are now well over 25,000 troops involved. It is estimated that during 2006, there were about 2,000 drug-related violent deaths, about 2,300 deaths during 2007, and more than 6,200 people by the end of 2008. Many of the dead were gang members killed by rivals or by the government, some have been bystanders.

Drug trafficking is acknowledged as an issue with shared responsibilities that requires coordinated measures by the U.S. and Mexico. In March 2009, United States Secretary of State Hillary Clinton, when officially visited Mexico City, stated that:

Our insatiable demand for illegal drugs fuels the drug trade. Our inability to prevent weapons from being illegally smuggled across the border to arm these criminals causes the deaths of police officers, soldiers and civilians.

=== Illegal migration ===
Almost a third of all immigrants in the U.S. were born in Mexico, being the source of the greatest number of both authorized (20%) and unauthorized (56%) migrants who come to the U.S. every year. Since the early 1990s, Mexican immigrants are no longer concentrated in California, the Southwest, and Illinois, but have been coming to new gateway states, including New York, North Carolina, Georgia, Nevada, and Washington, D.C., in increasing numbers. This phenomenon can be mainly attributed to poverty in Mexico, the growing demand for unskilled labor in the U.S., the existence of established family and community networks that allow migrants to arrive in the U.S. with people known to them.

The framework of U.S. immigration law has largely remained the same since 1965. The U.S. economy needs both high-skilled and low-skilled immigrant workers to remain competitive and to have enough workers who continue to pay into Social Security and Medicare as the U.S. population grows older. Nonetheless, there are currently very few channels for immigration to the U.S. for work-related reasons under current law. Furthermore, Amnesty International has taken concern regarding the excessive brutality inflicted upon illegal immigrants, which includes beatings, sexual assault, denial of medical attention, and denial of food, water and warmth for long periods.

For many years, the Mexican government showed limited interest in the issues. However, former President Vicente Fox actively sought to recognize the contribution of migrants to the U.S. and Mexico and to pursue a bilateral migration agreement with the U.S. government, which eventually failed. The administration of Felipe Calderón had placed an emphasis on how to create jobs in Mexico, enhance border security, and protect Mexican citizens living abroad.

Traditionally, Mexico built a reputation as one of the classic asylum countries, with a varying attitude toward refugees from Spain and other European countries before and during World War II, from Latin America's Southern Cone in the 1970s, and from Central America since the beginning of the 1980s. However, in recent years refugees who solicit asylum are usually treated as if they were just immigrants, with exhaustive administrative processes. The southern border of Mexico has experienced a significant increase in legal and illegal flows since the 1990s, in particular for migrants seeking to transit Mexico to reach the U.S. José Luis Soberanes, president of the National Human Rights Commission, condemned the repressing policy implemented by the Mexican government against illegal immigrants who cross the country's southern border. President Calderón modified the "General Law on Population" to derogate some penalties against immigrants like jail time, instead imposing fines of up to US$500 on illegal immigrants.

== See also ==
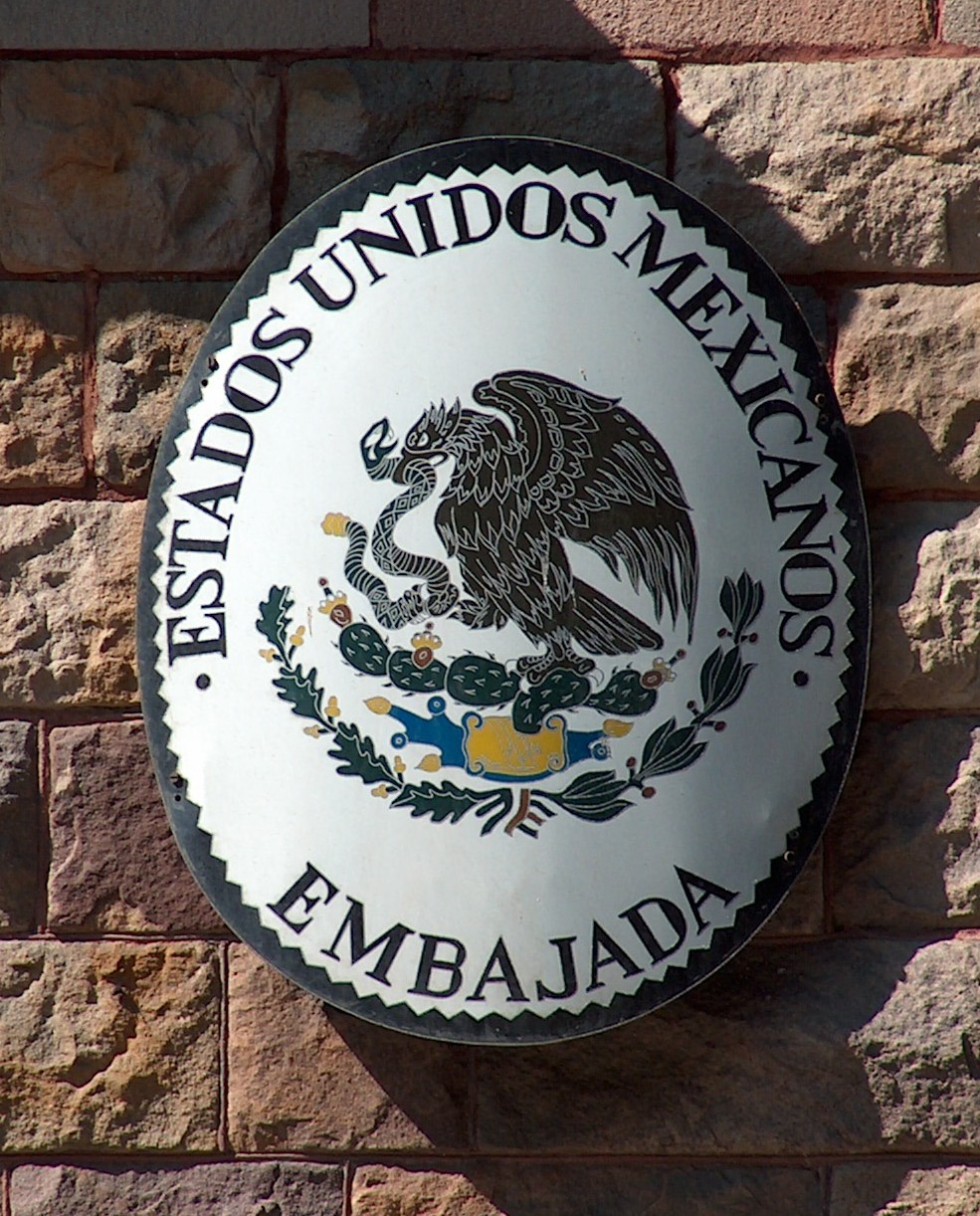

Diplomacy

- List of diplomatic missions in Mexico
- List of diplomatic missions of Mexico
- Mexican Council on Foreign Relations
- Secretariat of Foreign Affairs (Mexico)

Policy and Doctrine

- Estrada Doctrine
- Castañeda Doctrine
- Human rights in Mexico
