= Castañeda Doctrine =

The Castañeda Doctrine is a term used as reference to Mexico's foreign policy during the presidency of Vicente Fox. Its name derives from its proponent, Jorge Castañeda Gutman.

Fox appointed Castañeda to be his Secretary of Foreign Affairs at the beginning of his term. Castañeda immediately broke with the old-style foreign policy, known as the Estrada Doctrine. The new foreign policy called for an openness and an acceptance of criticism from the international community and the increase of Mexican involvement in foreign affairs.

However, after a series of foreign policy blunders, such as Mexico's temporary rift with Cuba and criticism from many other Latin American countries such as Argentina and Venezuela for adopting a pro-US stance with the doctrine, the Castañeda Doctrine was later effectively, if not officially, discontinued under the Calderón administration.
