= Mexico–Monaco relations =

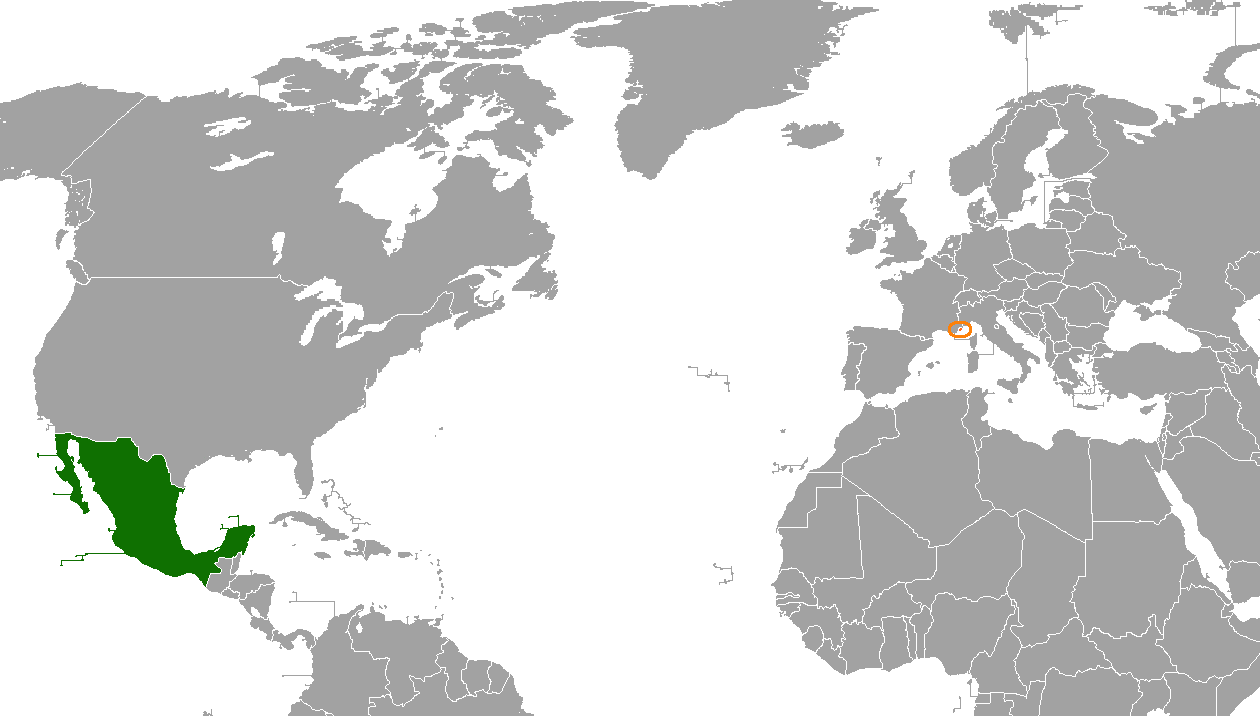

- Mexico: Monaco

The nations of Mexico and Monaco established diplomatic relations in 1881. Both nations are members of the United Nations.

== History ==
Diplomatic relations between Mexico and Monaco were established in 1881. The House of Grimaldi is partially descended from an aristocratic Mexican family with Prince Pierre, Duke of Valentinois being of Mexican origin on his mother's side. In October 1968, Prince Rainier of Monaco and Princess Grace Kelly paid a visit to Mexico City to attend the inauguration of the 1968 Summer Olympics. They also toured Mayan ruins in the state of Yucatán.

In 1993, Mexico accredited its consul-general based in Paris to Monaco. In 2001, both nations elevated their relations to the level of embassies and Mexico accredited its ambassador to France to Monaco. In November 2002, Prince Albert of Monaco paid a visit to Mexico to attend a meeting for the International Olympic Committee being held in Mexico City. This was not the Prince's first visit to Mexico as he appeared in a cameo for a film (One Man's Hero) in 1999 which was partially filmed in Mexico. Prince Albert would return to Mexico several times more for various reasons including a visit to Mexico in 2011 with the purpose of implementing actions in favor of the environment and the protection of oceans.

Mexico and Monaco share a close educational collaboration promoting the visit of young Mexicans to train in the fields of gastronomy, hospitality and tourism. The Turquois Foundation, established by the honorary consuls Raymond Turquois and Emilio Gonzáles de Castila was created as an initiative destined to grant 15 scholarships each year in Monaco to young Mexicans under the age of twenty-four, to continue their professional training in the gastronomic, hotel and tourism sector. More than 100 young Mexicans have benefited from this program.

== High-level visits ==
High-level visits from Monaco to Mexico

- Prince Rainier III (1968)
- Princess Grace Kelly (1968)
- Prince Albert II (2002, 2007, 2011, 2017)

== Trade ==
In 2023, trade between Mexico and Monaco totaled US$6.6 million. Mexico's main exports to Monaco include: wristwatches and pocket watches; suites, ensemble and jackets; mobile telephones; and undenatured ethyl alcohol. Monaco's main exports to Mexico include: pumps for liquid, soaps, make-up, perfumes, glasses and medical instruments.

== Diplomatic missions ==
- Mexico is accredited to Monaco from its embassy in Paris, France and maintains an honorary consulate in Monte Carlo.
- Monaco has an honorary consulate in Mexico City.

== Cultural exchange ==
The botanical garden of the Jardin Exotique de Monaco has the largest collection of succulent plants in the northern hemisphere, and contains a greenhouse entirely dedicated to Mexican species.
