= Paweł =

Paweł is a Polish form of the masculine given name Pavel, as well as a surname. Notable people with the name Paweł or Pawel include:

== Given name ==
- Pawel Abbott (born 1982), Polish footballer
- Paweł Adamowicz (1965–2019), Polish assassinated politician and lawyer
- Pawel Anaszkiewicz, Polish-Mexican artist
- Pawel Bartoszek, Polish-Icelandic politician
- Paweł Brożek (born 1983), Polish footballer
- Pawel Brylowski (born 1989), Polish cyclist
- Paweł Cibicki (born 1994), Swedish footballer
- Paweł Chrupałła (born 2003), Polish footballer
- Paweł Deląg (born 1970), Polish actor
- Paweł Fajdek (born 1989), Polish hammer thrower
- Pawel Hawrylak, Polish-Canadian physicist
- Paweł Horodecki (born 1971), Polish physicist
- Paweł Jasienica (1909–1970), Polish historian, journalist, essayist and soldier
- Pawel Jaworski, Polish submission grappler
- Paweł Kisielow (born 1945), Polish immunologist
- Paweł Kontny (1910–1945), Polish Roman Catholic priest killed by Soviet soldiers
- Paweł Korzeniowski (born 1985), Polish swimmer
- Paweł Łukaszewski (born 1968), Polish composer
- Paweł Mąciwoda (born 1967), Polish bassist for the German rock band Scorpions
- Pawel Monat (born 1921), Polish spy who defected to the United States
- Paweł Mykietyn (born 1971), Polish composer
- Paweł Nastula (born 1970), Polish judoka and mixed martial artist, world and Olympic judo champion
- Paweł Pawlak (born 1989), Polish mixed martial artist
- Paweł Pawlikowski (born 1957), Polish film director
- Pawel Pogorzelski (born 1979), Polish-Canadian cinematographer
- Paweł Strzelecki (1797–1873), Polish explorer, geologist, environmentalist and philanthropist
- Pawel Szajda (born 1982), American actor
- Paweł Szefernaker (born 1987), Polish politician
- Paweł Warszawski (born 1981), Polish equestrian
- Paweł Tomasz Wasilewski (born 1982), stage name Paul Wesley, American actor and film director
- Paweł Włodkowic (ca. 1370–1435), Polish scholar, jurist and rector of the Kraków Academy
- Paweł Wojciechowski (disambiguation)
- Paweł Wszołek (born 1992), Polish footballer
- Paweł Zagumny (born 1997), Polish volleyball player
- Paweł Zaremba (1915–1979), Polish historian, publicist, lawyer, radio journalist and publisher
- Paweł Zieliński (born 1990), Polish footballer

== Surname ==
- Ernst Pawel (1920–1994), German-born American biographer, novelist and translator
- Szarlota Pawel (1950–2018), Polish comic book artist
