= Woźniak =

Woźniak (Polish pronunciation: [ˈvɔʑɲak]; archaic feminines: Woźniakowa (by husband), Woźniakówna (by father)) is a Polish surname. Regional variant: Woźniok. It was the ninth most common surname in Poland in 2009.

Notable people with the Woźniak surname:

- Aleksandra Woźniak (born 1975), Polish psychologist and actress
- Aleksandra Wozniak (born 1987), Canadian tennis player
- Andrzej Woźniak (born 1965), Polish footballer
- Angela Wozniak (born 1987), New York state assemblywoman
- Arkadiusz Woźniak (born 1990), Polish footballer
- Dagmara Wozniak (born 1988), American Olympic fencer
- Daniel Wozniak (athlete), Polish athlete
- Daniel Wozniak (murderer) (born 1984), American convicted murderer
- Doug Wozniak (born 1947), American politician
- John Wozniak (disambiguation), multiple people
- Karl-Heinz Wozniak, German slalom canoeist
- Maciej Woźniak (born 2001), Polish football player
- Mariusz Woźniak (1944–2010), Polish diplomat
- Max Wosniak (1926–2023), Polish-American football player and manager
- Mike Wozniak (born 1979), British comedian
- Nate Wozniak (born 1994), American football player
- Paulina Woźniak (born 1992), Polish swimmer
- Paweł Woźniak (born 1969), Polish hurdler
- Piotr Woźniak (geologist) (born 1956), Polish public servant and geologist
- Piotr Woźniak (researcher) (born 1962), Polish academic, known for the SuperMemo learning system
- Radim Wozniak (born 1978), Czech footballer
- Scott Wozniak (born 1997), American YouTuber
- Steve Wozniak (born 1950), American computer engineer and co-founder of Apple Inc.
- Szymon Woźniak (born 1993), Polish speedway rider
- Tadeusz Woźniak (born 1960), Polish politician
- Troy Wozniak (born 1978), Australian rugby league player
