= Rodziński =

Rodziński (feminine: Rodzińska) is a surname of Polish origin. Notable people with this surname include:

- Artur Rodziński (1892–1958), Polish conductor
- Witold Rodziński (1918–1997), Polish historian, sinologist and diplomat
