= Zenon Kosiniak-Kamysz =

Polish politician (born 1958)

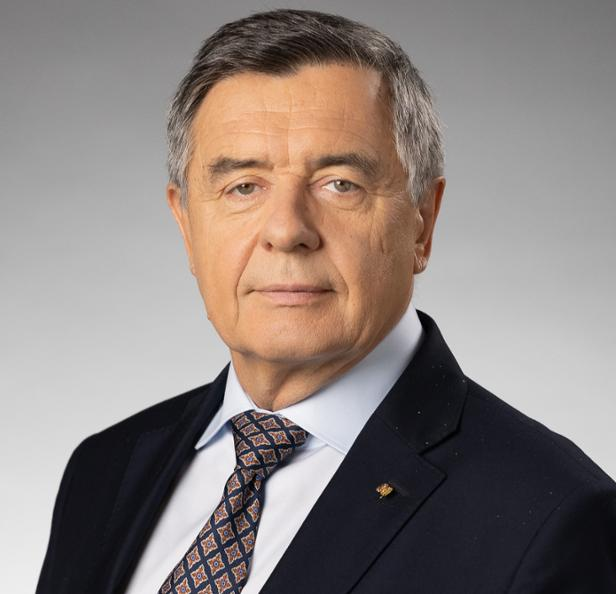

Poland Ambassador to Slovakia
- In office 2003–2007
- Preceded by: Jan Komornicki
- Succeeded by: Bogdan Wrzochalski

Poland Ambassador to Canada
- In office 2010–2013
- Preceded by: Piotr Ogrodziński
- Succeeded by: Marcin Bosacki

Poland Ambassador to Singapore
- In office 2014–2018
- Preceded by: Waldemar Dubaniowski
- Succeeded by: Magdalena Bogdziewicz

Poland Ambassador to Austria
- Incumbent
- Assumed office 2025
- Preceded by: Jolanta Róża Kozłowska

Personal details
- Born: 25 February 1958 (age 68) Bieniaszowice, Poland
- Spouse: Katarzyna Kosiniak-Kamysz
- Education: Dresden University of Technology
- Profession: Diplomat, official, politician

Zenon Henryk Kosiniak-Kamysz (born 25 February 1958, in Bieniaszowice) is a Polish diplomat, official, politician, serving as Undersecretary of State in the Ministry of the Interior and Administration (2001–2003) and the Ministry of National Defence (2008–2009), ambassador to Slovakia (2003–2007), Canada (2010–2013), Singapore (2014–2018), and Austria (since 2025).

== Life ==
Kosiniak-Kamysz graduated in 1981 from the Dresden University of Technology. In 1983, he finished post-graduate studies in foreign trade at the Kraków University of Economics.

Following his studies, he worked for two years in Leipzig as deputy head of the trade company "Budimex". Next, he was deputy director of the Polish Foreign Trade Chamber office in Kraków. In 1990, he started his diplomatic career as First Secretary at the Embassy in Budapest, Hungary. From 1994 to 1996, he was the director of the departments at the Ministry of Foreign Affairs and at the Ministry of Economic Cooperation with Abroad. Between 1996 and 2001, he was the head of the Economic Section at the Embassy in Berlin, Germany.

Recommended by the Polish People's Party, in 2001 he took the post of Undersecretary of State in the Ministry of the Interior and Administration, being responsible for integration with the European Union, among others. From 2003 to 30 June 2007, he served as ambassador to Slovakia. Directly after, he was once more seconded in Berlin as head of the Economic Section.

Between March 2008 and November 2009, he was Undersecretary of State in the Ministry of National Defence. From January 2010 to 16 August 2013, he was ambassador to Canada. In June 2014, he was nominated ambassador to Singapore. He was also representing Poland at the Board of Governors of the Asia–Europe Foundation. On 20 July 2018, he finished his term. Until his retirement in February 2023, he worked at the MFA Department of Economic Cooperation. In October 2024, he returned to the diplomatic service and became chargé d’affaires at the Embassy in Vienna, Austria, in April 2025 being nominated ambassador to Austria.

== Private Life ==
Brother of professor Kazimierz Kosiniak-Kamysz and Andrzej Kosiniak-Kamysz, minister of health (1989–91), uncle of Władysław Kosiniak-Kamysz, deputy prime minister (since 2023). Married to Katarzyna Kosiniak-Kamysz.

Besides his native Polish, he speaks English, German, Slovak, and Russian.

== Honours ==
- Silver Cross of Merit, Poland, 2002.
- Great Cross of Merit with Star, Germany, 2002.
- Order of the White Double Cross, Second Class, Slovakia, 2008.
- Commander's Cross of the Hungarian Order of Merit, Hungary, 2009.
