= Jarosław Szczepankiewicz =

Polish diplomat

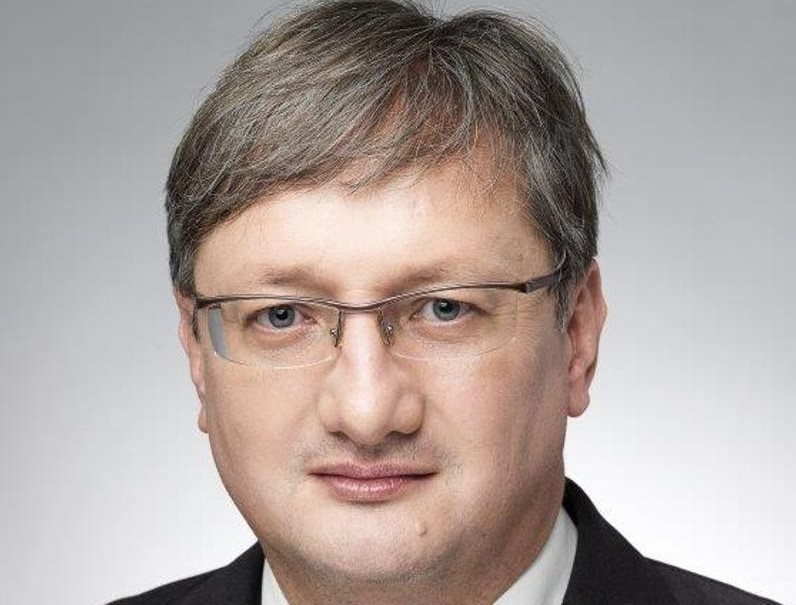

Poland Ambassador to Ethiopia
- In office 15 January 2008 – 3 August 2012
- Preceded by: Mariusz Woźniak
- Succeeded by: Jacek Jankowski

Poland Ambassador to the Philippines
- In office 2018–2024
- Preceded by: Krzysztof Szumski

Personal details
- Born: 1962 (age 63–64)
- Education: Catholic University of Lublin, National School of Public Administration, Warsaw
- Profession: Diplomat

Jarosław Roman Szczepankiewicz (born 1962) is a Polish diplomat.

He was an ambassador to Ethiopia and African Union from 2008 to 2012, and chargé d'affaires to the Philippines from 2018 to 2024.

== Life ==
Szczepankiewicz holds a Master of Arts degree in Oriental philosophy from the Catholic University of Lublin.

He also studied at the Institut national des langues et civilisations orientales in Paris, the National School of Public Administration in Warsaw, the Netherlands Institute of International Relations Clingendael in The Hague, and the University of Paris.

In 1998, Szczepankiewicz joined Poland's Ministry of Foreign Affairs. He has been working as a Head of Task Force Group, Department of European Integration.

Between 2001 and 2007 he was Head of Section at the Department of Promotion.

From 2008 to 2012 he held the post of the ambassador extraordinary and plenipotentiary of the Republic of Poland to the Federal Democratic Republic of Ethiopia, accredited also to the Republic of Djibouti and Permanent Representative of Poland to the African Union.

Afterwards, from 2012 to 2017, he was Minister-Counsellor at the Department of Africa and the Middle East. For the next year he was at the Consular Department.

Between 2018 and 2024 he was representing Poland to the Philippines as chargé d'affaires.

Beside Polish, he speaks English and French.
