= Karin Hinzer =

Canadian physicist and academic

- Education: University of Ottawa
- Scientific career
- Workplaces: University of Ottawa
- Thesis: Optical properties of GaAs-based self-assembled quantum dots and quantum dot lasers (2002)

Karin Hinzer is a Canadian physicist who is a professor and Vice Dean for Research at the University of Ottawa. She holds a University Research Chair in Photonic Devices for Energy. Her research considers new strategies to harness solar energy.

== Early life and education ==
Hinzer was born in Canada. She earned her undergraduate and graduate degrees at the University of Ottawa. Her master's research investigated semiconductor quantum dot lasers. Her early work considered the physics of quantum dots. She developed strategies to design and fabricate III-V multi-junction semiconductor devices at the National Research Council Canada.

== Research and career ==
In 2007, Hinzer joined the University of Ottawa, where she launched a lab that models and characterises next-generation solar cells. She established SUNLAB, the top solar cell research facility in Canada. She was appointed Tier II Canada Research Chair in Photonic Nanostructures and Integrated Devices, and worked alongside Morgan Solar to increase the efficiency of solar panels. Hinzer showed that semiconductor quantum dots could be used to capture the whole solar spectrum, which could be used in combination with solar concentrators. Working with the Université de Sherbrooke on a new strategy for high efficiency solar cells, which they achieved by reducing electrode-induced shadowing and size.

Hinzer is the Vice Dean for Research at the University of Ottawa. She is Editor of the IEEE Journal of Photovoltaics.

== Awards and honours ==
- 2010 Canadian Energy Award
- 2016 SPIE Women in Optcs Planner
- 2015 Ontario Ministry of Research and Innovation Early Researcher Award

== Selected publications ==
- M. Bayer; G. Ortner; O. Stern; et al. (2002). "Fine structure of neutral and charged excitons in self-assembled In(Ga)As/(Al)GaAs quantum dots". Physical Review B. 65 (19). doi:10.1103/physrevb.65.195315. Wikidata Q59475971.
- Manfred Bayer; Paweł Hawrylak; Hinzer K; Fafard S; Korkusinski M; Wasilewski ZR; Stern O; Alfred Forchel (2001). "Coupling and entangling of quantum states in quantum dot molecules". Science. 291 (5503): 451–453. doi:10.1126/science.291.5503.451. PMID 11161192. Wikidata Q59476118.
- Fafard S; Hinzer K; Raymond S; Dion M; McCaffrey J; Feng Y; Charbonneau S (1996). "Red-Emitting Semiconductor Quantum Dot Lasers". Science. 274 (5291): 1350–1353. doi:10.1126/science.274.5291.1350. PMID 8910269. Wikidata Q36831471.
