= Polish Mexicans =

Polish Mexicans polscy meksykanie polaco-mexicanos
Total population
- 1,169 Poland-born residents (2015)

Regions with significant populations
- Mexico City

Languages
- Spanish · Polish

Religion
- Roman Catholicism, Judaism

Related ethnic groups
- Other Polish diasporas

There is a Polish diaspora in Mexico. According to the 2005 intercensal estimate, there were 971 Polish citizens living in Mexico. Furthermore, by the estimate of the Jewish community, there may be as many as 15,000 descendants of Jewish migrants from Poland living in Mexico.

== Migration history ==
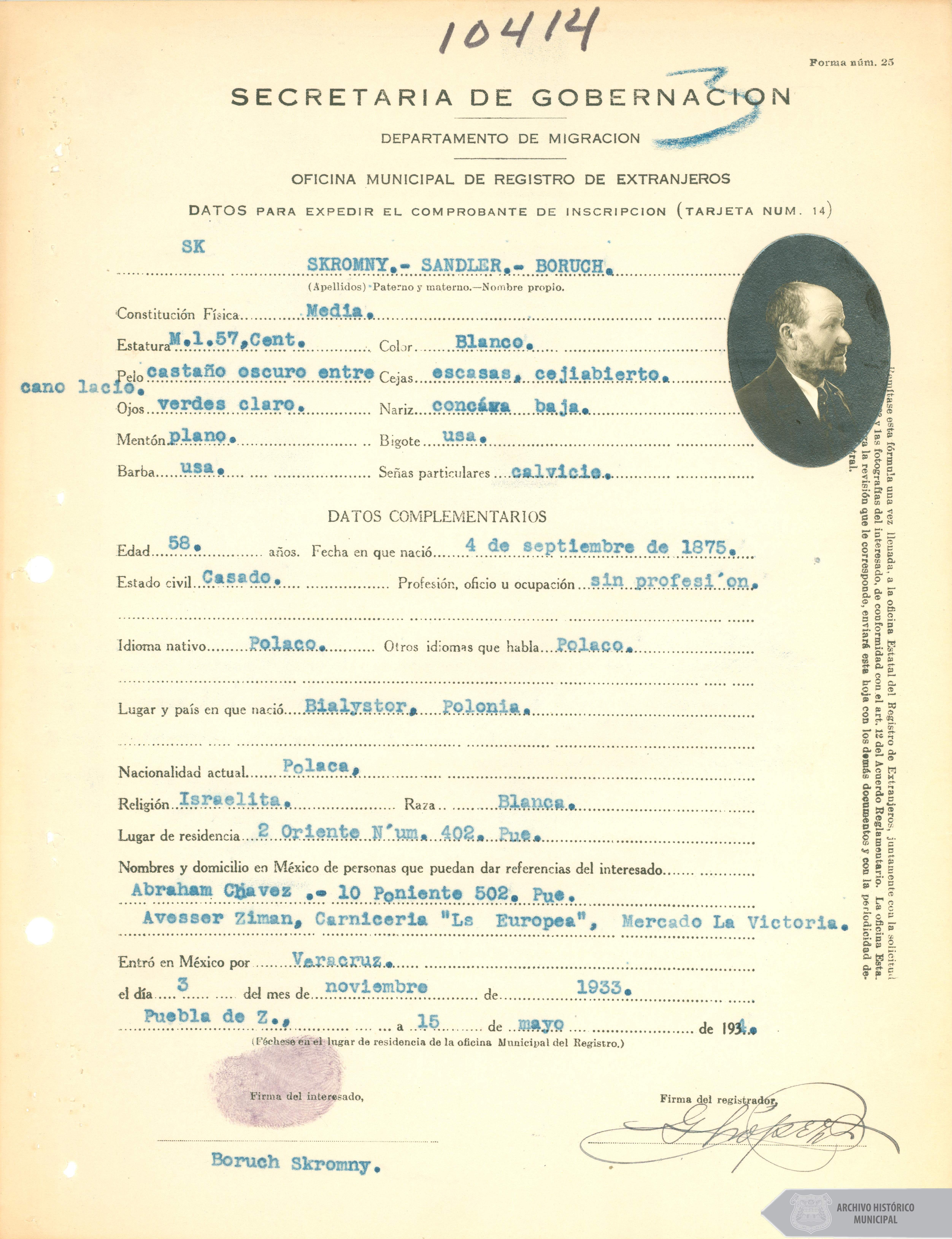
Immigration registration form of a Jewish Pole that emigrated in 1933

The first Poles arrived in Mexico during the French intervention in Mexico. In May 1942, Mexico declared war on Germany. To show solidarity with the Polish people, Mexico accepted in 1943 over 2,000 Polish refugees including 1,400 Polish orphans to settle in the state of Guanajuato in central Mexico. After the war, many of the refugees remained to live in Mexico.

== Polish-Mexicans ==
=== Athletics ===
- Helen Plaschinski, Mexican former Olympics freestyle swimmer for Summer 1980 of Polish descent.

=== Artist/Musician ===
- Henryk Szeryng, Polish-born Mexican violinist and composer.
- David Ostrosky, Mexican actor to Polish mother.
- Eva Maria Zuk, Polish-born Mexican piano concertist.
- Fanny Rabel, Polish-born Mexican artist.
- Zbigniew Paleta, Polish-born Mexican violinist and composer for telenovelas and the Cinema of Mexico.
- Pawel Anaszkiewicz, Polish-born Mexican artist.
- Tamara de Lempicka, Polish-born Mexican Art Deco painter.

=== Movies/television/media ===
- Ludwika Paleta, Polish-born Mexican actress.
- Dominika Paleta, Polish-born Mexican actress.
- Ludwik Margules, Polish-born Mexican theatre, opera and film director.
- Kristoff Raczyñski, Russian-born Mexican actor, film producer, screenwriter and TV host of Polish descent.
- Maya Mishalska, Polish-born Mexican actress, violinist and TV presenter.
- Alicja Bachleda-Curuś, Mexican-born Polish actress and singer.
- Helen Kleinbort Krauze, Polish Jewish-born Mexican journalist.
- León Krauze, Mexican journalist, author and news anchor of Polish descent.
- Arleta Jeziorska, Polish-born Mexican actress of films and telenovelas.
- Alfredo Ripstein, Mexican film producer to Polish Jewish father.
- Mauricio Kleiff, Mexican screenwriter of Polish descent.
- Jacobo Zabludovsky Mexican journalist and news anchor of Polish-Jewish descent.
- Wojciech Cejrowski, Polish journalist and traveler, maintains a residence in Coyoacán, Mexico City.

=== Literature ===
- Rodolfo Usigli, Mexican playwright to Italian father and Polish mother.
- Sara Sefchovich, Mexican writer born into a Polish/Lithuanian Jewish family.

=== Politics ===
- Julio Boltvinik Kalinka, Mexican academic and politician of Polish descent.
- David Goldbaum, Mexican surveyor and politician to Polish Jewish father of German and Polish descent.
- David Kershenobich Stalnikowitz, secretary of Health of Mexico.

=== Science ===
- Sara Topelson de Grinberg, Polish-born Mexican architect to Russian father and Polish mother.
- Jerzy Rzedowski, Polish-born Mexican botanist.
- José Woldenberg, Mexican political scientist and sociologist to Polish father and Lithuanian mother.
- Arturo Warman, Mexican anthropologist to Polish Jewish parents.

=== Miscellaneous ===
- Moisés Kaiman, Polish-born Mexican Rabbi for the Jewish Community of Monterrey, Mexico.
- Arturo Antonio Szymanski Ramírez, Mexican prelate of the Roman Catholic Church of Polish descent.

== See also ==
- Mexico–Poland relations
- White Mexicans
- Polish diaspora
