= Krzysztof Szumski =

Polish diplomat

Poland Ambassador to the Philippines
- In office 1991–1993
- Preceded by: Lucjan Mieczkowski
- Succeeded by: Jarosław Szczepankiewicz

Poland Ambassador to Thailand
- In office 1993–1997
- Preceded by: Lucjan Mieczkowski
- Succeeded by: Jerzy Surdykowski

Poland Ambassador to Indonesia
- In office 2000–2005
- Preceded by: Ksawery Burski
- Succeeded by: Tomasz Łukaszuk

Poland Ambassador to China
- In office 2005–2009
- Preceded by: Ksawery Burski
- Succeeded by: Tadeusz Chomicki

Personal details
- Born: May 11, 1944 (age 82) Pilzno
- Education: Main School of Planning and Statistics
- Profession: Diplomat

Krzysztof Tadeusz Szumski (born 11 May 1944, Pilzno) is a Polish diplomat, ambassador to the Philippines (1991–1993), Thailand (1993–1997), Indonesia (2000–2005), and China (2005–2009).

== Life ==
Szumski graduated from Main School of Planning and Statistics, External Trade Faculty, where he began his professional career. He has been member of the Polish Students' Association (1962–1968), and Polish United Workers' Party (1965–1990).

Since 1970, he has been cooperating with Polish intelligence (alias "Tadeusz"), two years later becoming employed by the Ministry of Interior. At the same time, in 1971, he joined the Ministry of Foreign Affairs. He served at the embassy in Paris (1980s). Four times he was appointed an ambassador: to the Philippines (1991–1993), Thailand (1993–1997), Indonesia (2000–2005), and China (2005–2009).

== Honours ==
- Officer of the Order of Polonia Restituta, Poland, 2010
- Knight Grand Cross of the Order of the White Elephant, Thailand
