= Mexico–Poland relations =

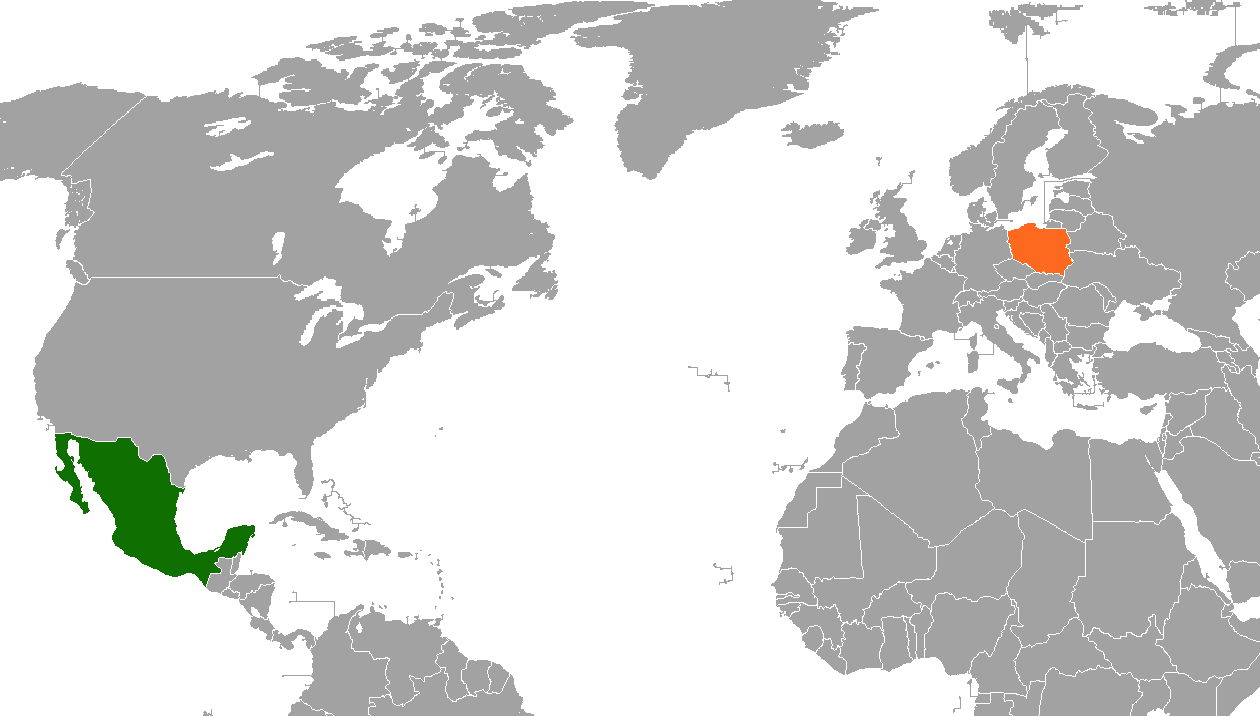

- Mexico: Poland

The nations of Mexico and Poland first established formal diplomatic relations in 1928, however, the two states interacted non-officially before then. As early as 1519, King Sigismund I of the Polish–Lithuanian Commonwealth became aware of Mexico from messages with his envoy in Spain, Jan Dantyszek, who corresponded with Hernán Cortés during the Spanish conquest of the Aztec Empire. Several Polish migrants began to migrate to New Spain (as Mexico was previously known before its independence). The first waves of Polish migrants to Mexico commenced in 1830 as well as the beginning of the 20th century due to various circumstances affecting Poland at the time such as insurrections, partitions and the two World Wars.

Both nations are members of the Organisation for Economic Co-operation and Development and the United Nations. Bilateral relations between Mexico and Poland are based on historical connection, trade and mutual trust between both nations.

== History ==
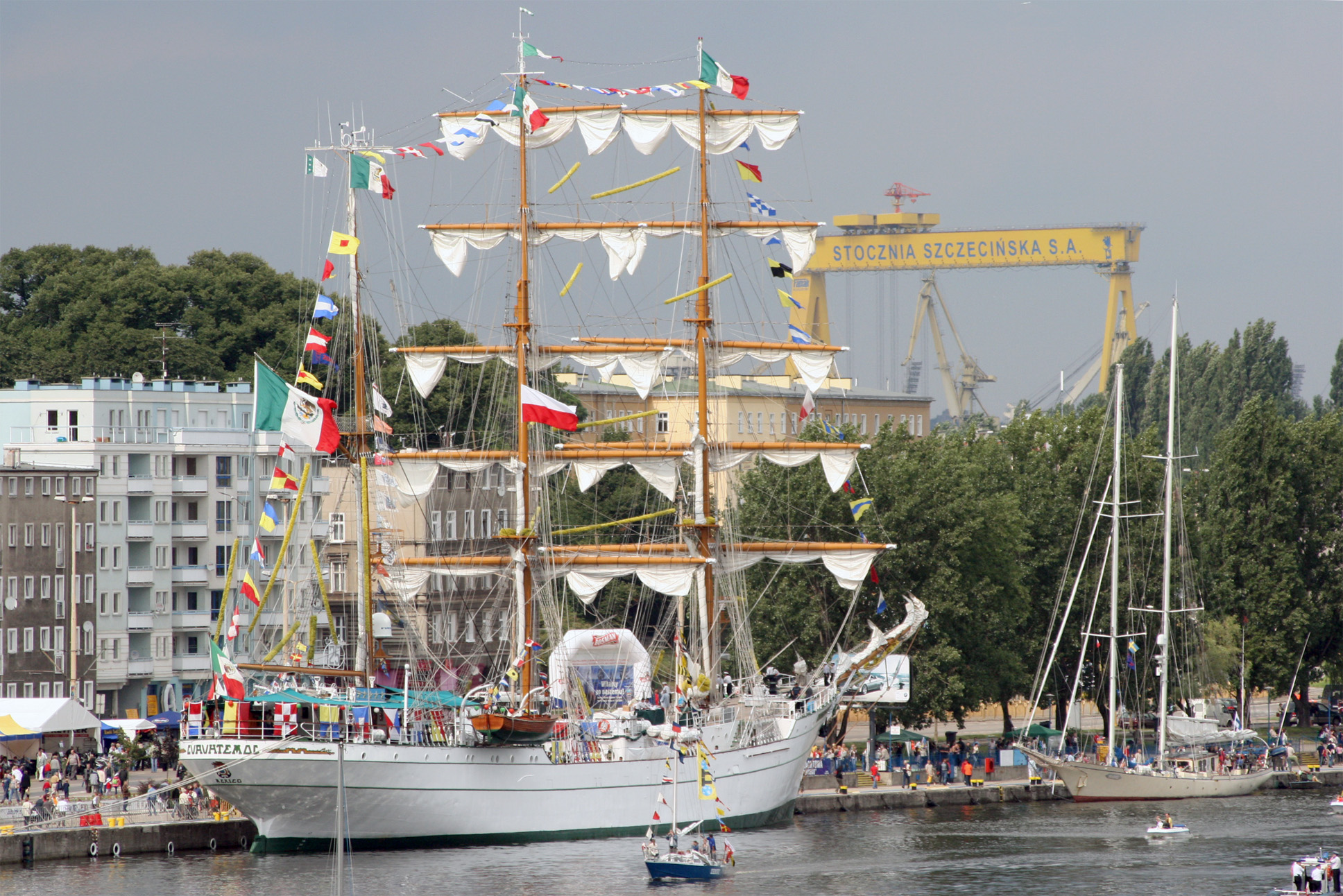
Mexican Navy training ship, the ARM Cuauhtémoc, visiting the Polish port city of Szczecin in 2007

During Spanish colonization of Mexico from 1519 to 1810, any relations between New Spain and the Commonwealth of Poland would have been via Spain. After some time, whereas Mexico was obtaining its independence from Spain, Poland, by contrast, was finding itself being invaded and split among the Kingdom of Prussia, the Austro-Hungarian Empire and the Russian Empire.

In 1830 during the November uprising in Poland; the first group of Polish migrants began arriving in Mexico, although many would later immigrate to the United States. In 1861, during the Second French intervention in Mexico, approximately 3,000 Polish soldiers were part of the invading army of Emperor Napoleon III, however, a few deserted and joined Benito Juárez's army.

At the end of World War I and after the signing of the Treaty of Versailles, Poland obtained its independence once more. In September 1921, Mexican President Álvaro Obregón recognized the national sovereignty of Poland. That same year, Polish Prince Albert Radziwill, who was head of the Polish Legation in Washington, D.C., United States, met with Mexican diplomats in the city, thus establishing the first official contact between the two nations. However, it was not until 26 February 1928 that diplomatic relations between the two countries were formally established. In 1930, Mexico and Poland signed a Treaty of Friendship, Commerce and Navigation and Mexico soon opened its first diplomatic legation in Warsaw.

In the 1930s, diplomatic relations between the two nations became difficult with the rise of Adolf Hitler in neighboring Germany to the west of Poland and the ever-expanding Soviet Union to the east. In August 1939, Germany and the Soviet Union signed a non-aggression treaty stating that they would not attack one another if a war broke out in Europe and that they would share between them the territory of Poland. This treaty was to be known as the Molotov–Ribbentrop Pact. During World War II, diplomatic relations between Mexico and Poland never ceased. Mexico vehemently condemned the invasion and occupation of Poland by both German and Soviet troops. In May 1942, Mexico declared war on Germany and in December 1942, Polish Prime Minister Władysław Sikorski paid an official visit to Mexico and met with Mexican President Manuel Ávila Camacho. To show solidarity with the Polish people, Mexico agreed to accept 30,000 Polish refugees including 1,400 Polish orphans to settle in the state of Guanajuato in central Mexico. After the war, many of the refugees remained to live in Mexico.

At the end of World War II, Mexico continued to maintain diplomatic relations with communist Poland. In 1960, both nations elevated their diplomatic missions to that of embassies. In 1963, President Adolfo López Mateos became the first Mexican head of state to visit Poland. That same year, Polish Prime Minister Józef Cyrankiewicz paid an official visit to Mexico. Diplomatic relations continued unabated even when Poland transitioned from having a communist government to a democratic one in 1989. In 1998, former Polish President Lech Wałęsa paid a visit to Mexico. Wałęsa returned to Mexico in December 2000 to attend the inauguration of President Vicente Fox. President Fox would himself pay a visit to Poland in May 2004.

In April 2017, the Polish President Andrzej Duda visited Mexico, meeting with his Mexican counterpart Enrique Peña Nieto. That same year, both nations commemorated the opening of a Polish Investment and Trade Agency office in Mexico City.

In 2024, both nations celebrated 95 years of diplomatic relations. In June 2026, Polish Foreign Vice-Minister Wojciech Zajączkowski paid a visit to Mexico to attend the 15th Round of Political Consultations between Poland and Mexico.

== High-level visits ==
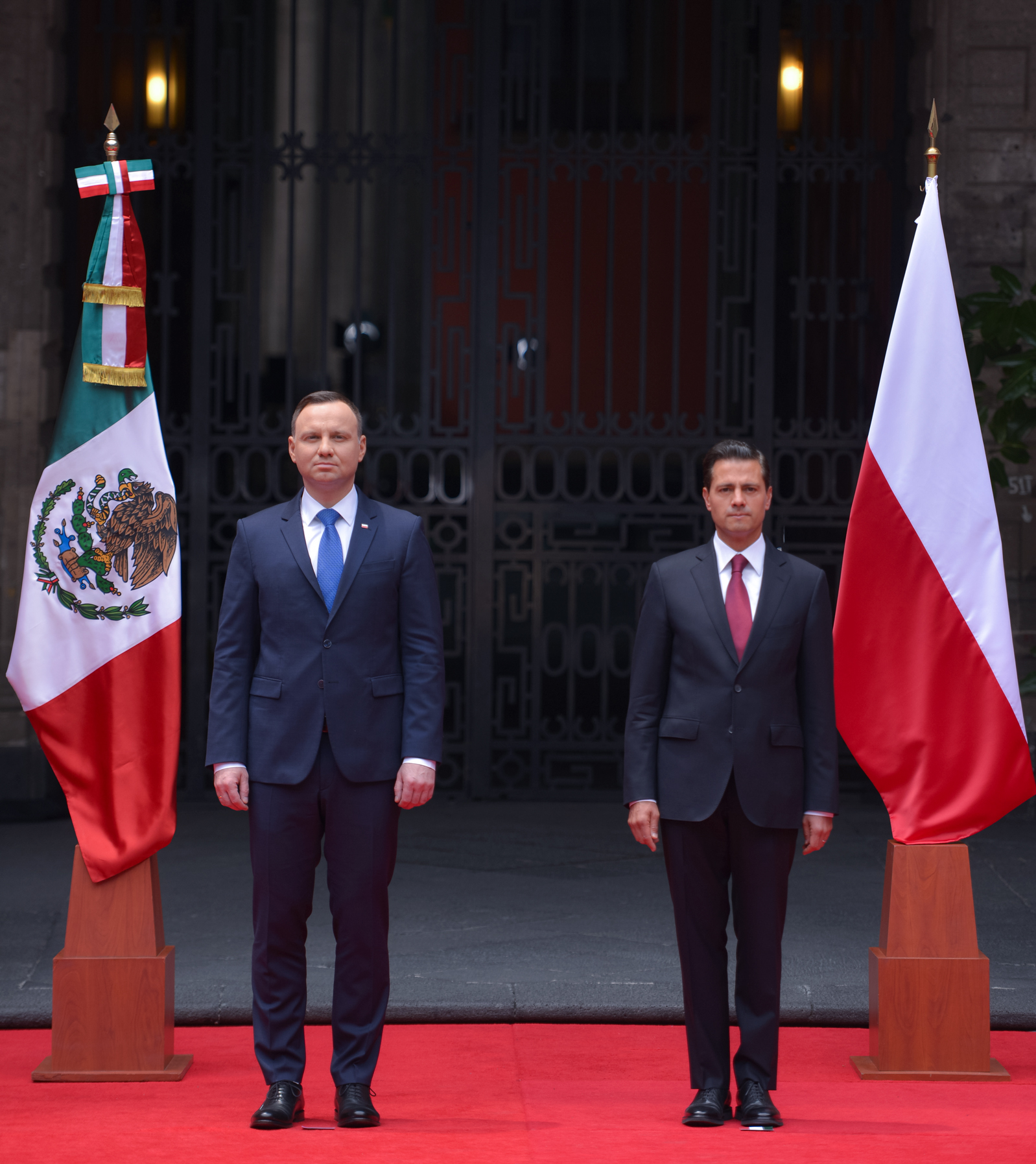
Mexican President Enrique Peña Nieto and Polish President Andrzej Duda in Mexico City, 2017.

High-level visits from Mexico to Poland

- President Adolfo López Mateos (1963)
- Foreign Minister Rosario Green (2000)
- President Vicente Fox (2004)
- Foreign Minister José Antonio Meade (2015)

High-level visits from Poland to Mexico

- Prime Minister Władysław Sikorski (1942)
- Prime Minister Józef Cyrankiewicz (1963)
- Chairman Henryk Jabłoński (1979)
- Prime Minister Jerzy Buzek (1998)
- Foreign Minister Włodzimierz Cimoszewicz (2003)
- President Aleksander Kwaśniewski (2004)
- President Andrzej Duda (2017)
- Foreign Vice-Minister Wojciech Zajączkowski (2026)

== Bilateral relations ==
Both nations have signed several bilateral agreements such as a Treaty of Friendship, Commerce and Navigation (1930); Agreement on Consular Relations (1985); Agreement on Air Transportation (1990); Agreement to Avoid Double Taxation and Prevent Tax Evasion in Tax Matters (1998); Agreement on Scientific and Technical Cooperation (1998); Agreement on the establishment of Political Consultations between Mexico and Poland (1998); Agreement of Cooperation to Combat Organized Crime and other types of Crimes (2002); Agreement on Tourism Cooperation (2004); Agreement on Educational and Cultural Cooperation (2017) and an Agreement on Exportation Credit (2017).

== Transportation and Tourism ==
LOT Polish Airlines operates seasonal charter flights between Cancún International Airport and Warsaw Chopin Airport and Katowice International Airport. In 2022, 66,000 Polish citizens traveled to Mexico for tourism. That same year, 20,000 Mexican citizens visited Poland.

== Trade and Economic Relations ==
In 1997, Mexico signed a Free Trade Agreement with the European Union, of which Poland is a member of since joining in 2004. Since then, trade between the two nations has increased dramatically. In 2023, two-way trade between the two nations amounted to US$3 billion. Mexico's main exports to Poland include: motor vehicles, tractors, cycles and other vehicles; memory units; razors; and turbojet, turboprop and gas turbines. Poland's main exports to Mexico include: motor vehicles and seats; goods for the Promotion Program of the Automotive and Auto Parts Industry Sector; and fuel pumps for diesel injection.

Mexican multinational companies such as Cemex, Grupo Industrial Saltillo, Katcon, Orbia and Nemak operate in Poland and Mexican beer and Tequila are readily found in the country. Polish Vodka and other liquors are available in Mexican all-inclusive resorts and are also sold in stores throughout the country. Polish multinational companies Boryszew, Bury Technologies, Sanok Rubber and Tip-Topol operate in Mexico. There are approximately 21 Polish companies operating in Mexico, most in the automotive industry. Mexican cinema and Telenovelas are also widely watched in Poland.

== Resident diplomatic missions ==
- Mexico has an embassy in Warsaw.
- Poland has an embassy in Mexico City.

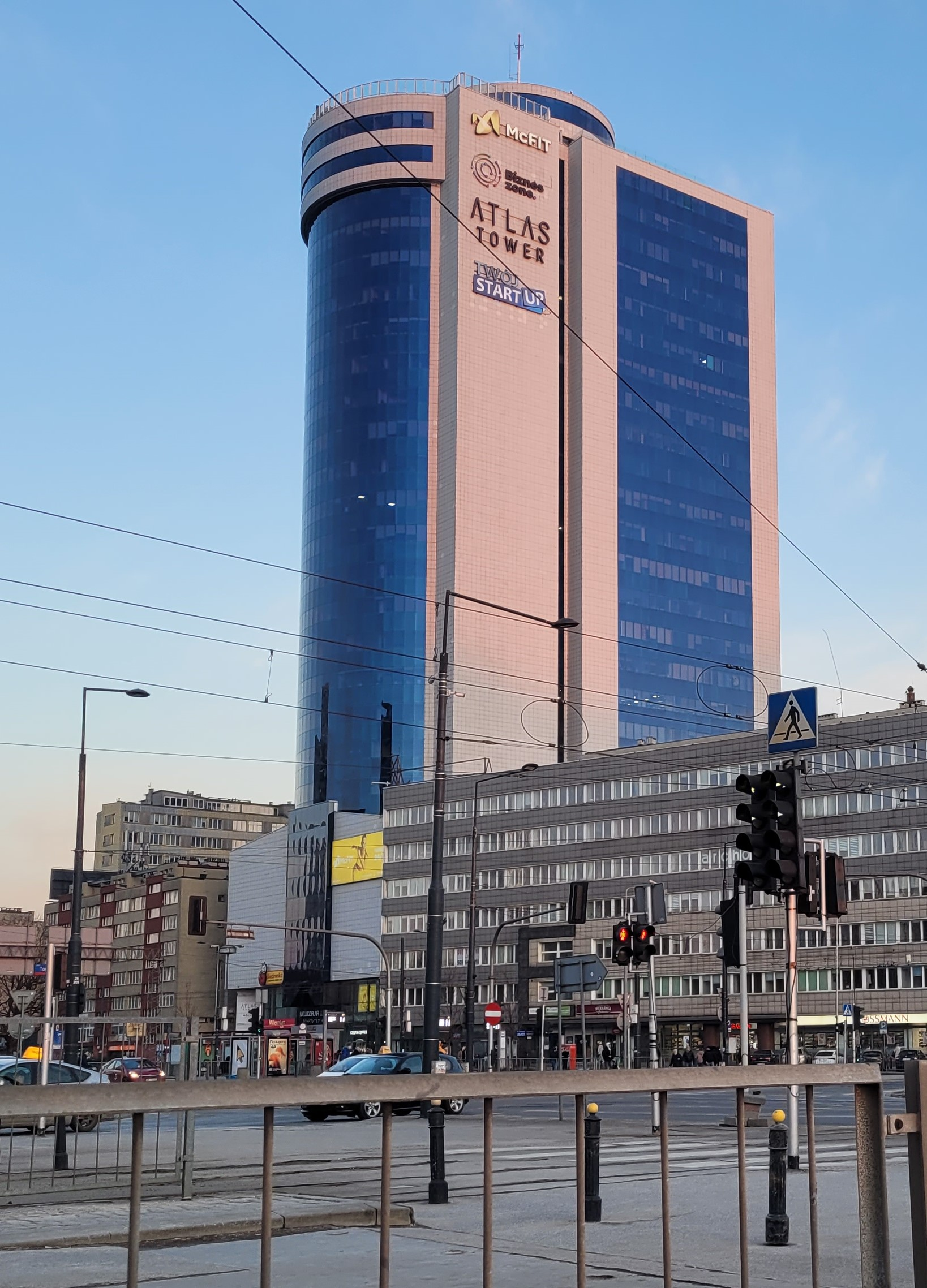
Atlas Tower hosting the Embassy of Mexico in Warsaw

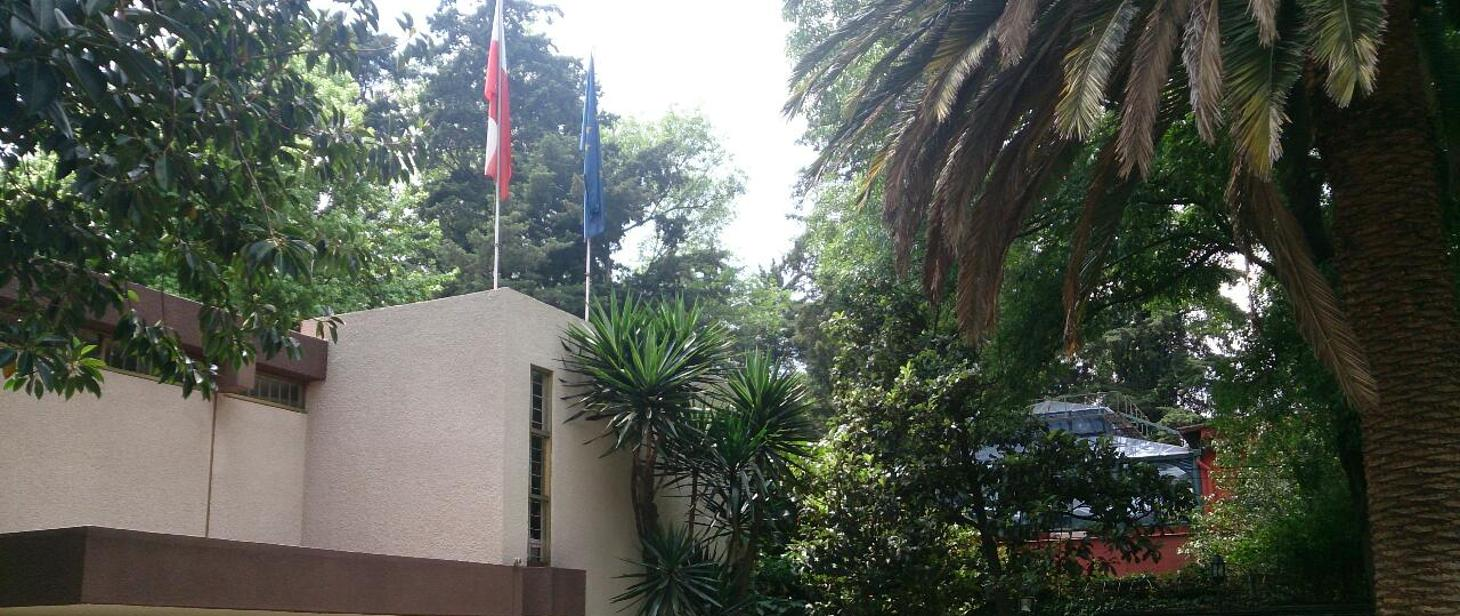
Embassy of Poland in Mexico City

== Gallery ==
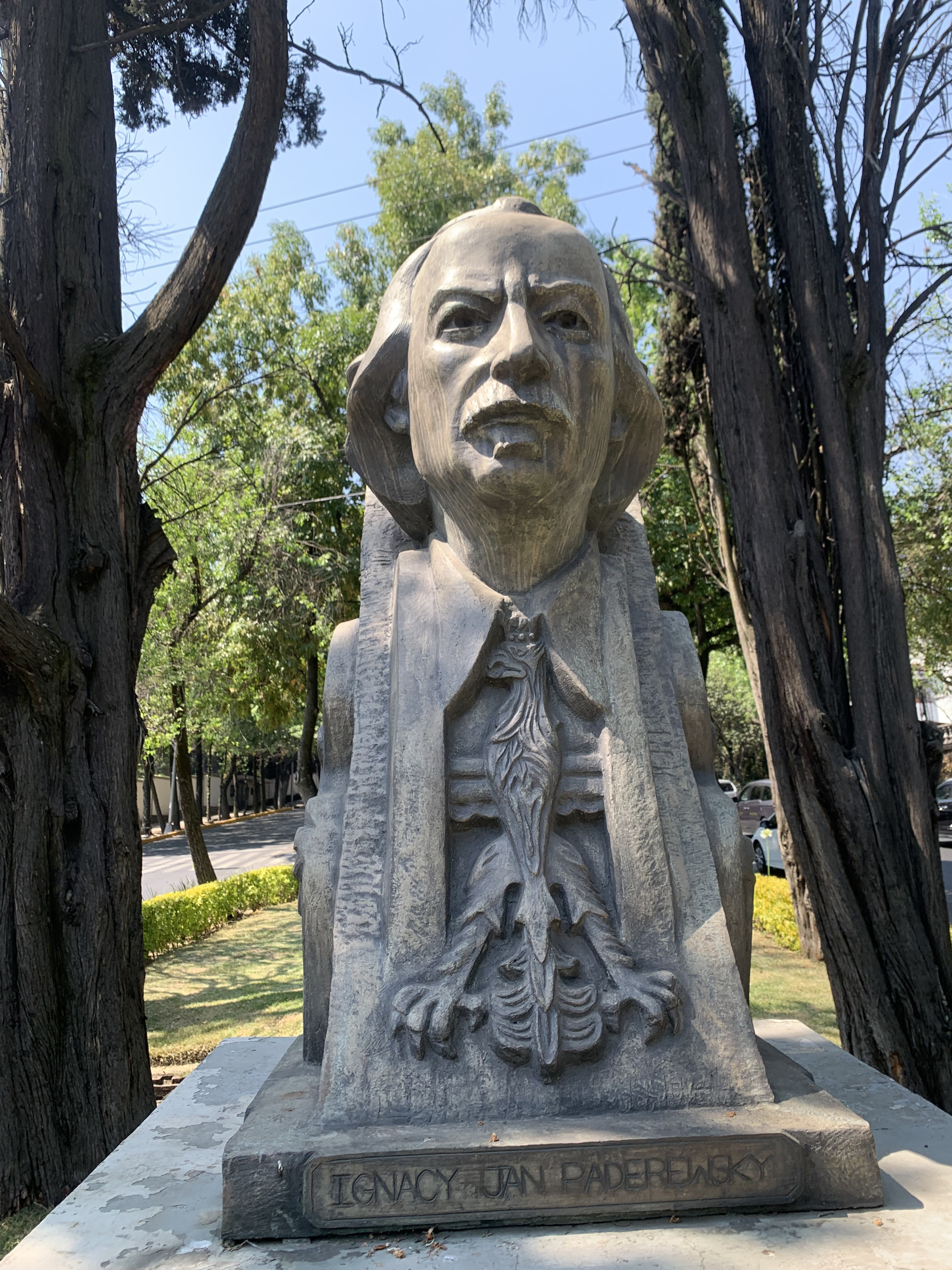
Bust of Polish pianist, composer, and Prime Minister Ignacy Jan Paderewski in Mexico City

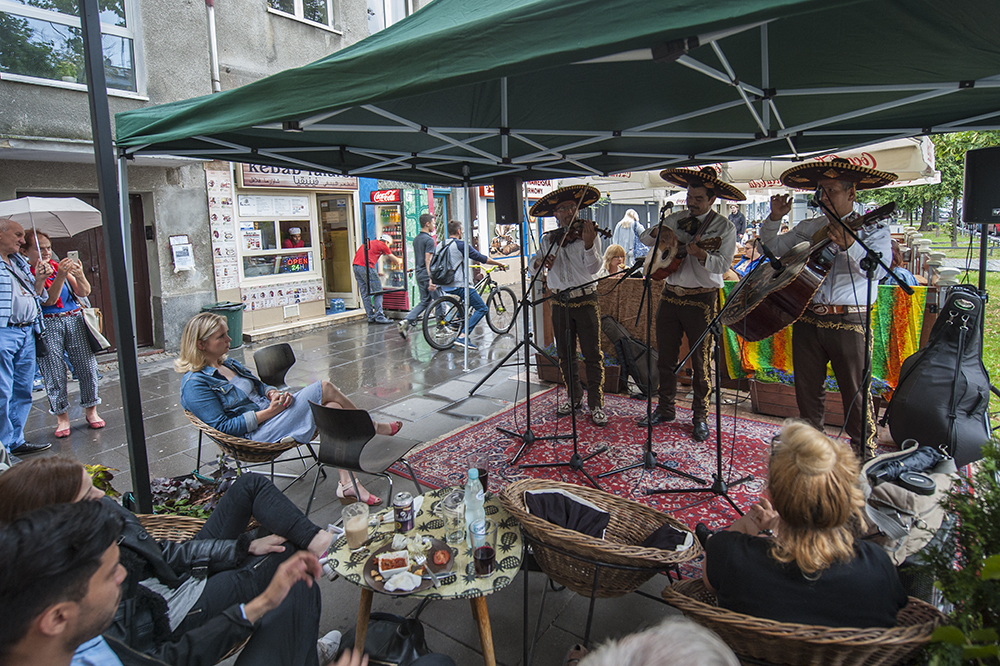
Mariachi musicians in Warsaw

Statue to Polish born Pope John Paul II in Mexico City

Elementary school in Warsaw named after President Benito Juárez

Poland-Mexico New Earth International Film Festival mural in Kraków

== See also ==
- Polish Mexicans
- Mexico–EU relations
