= Magdalena Bogdziewicz =

Polish politician

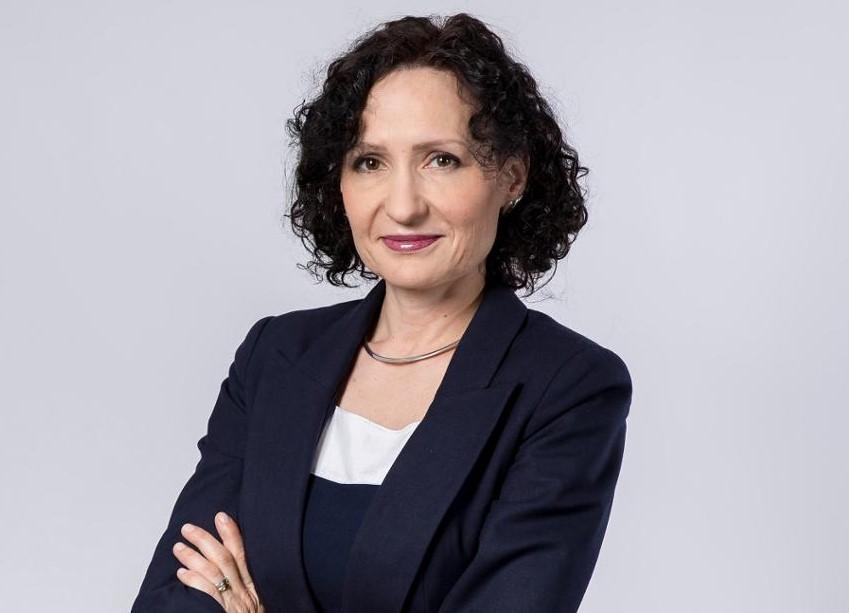

Poland Ambassador to Singapore
- In office 24 August 2018 – 18 August 2023
- Preceded by: Zenon Kosiniak-Kamysz
- Succeeded by: Tadeusz Chomicki

Personal details
- Born: 17 November 1975 (age 50)
- Spouse: Paweł Bogdziewicz
- Children: three
- Education: University of Wrocław
- Profession: diplomat

Magdalena Bogdziewicz (born 17 November 1975) is a Polish civil servant and diplomat who served as an ambassador to Singapore between 2018 and 2023.

Magdalena Bogdziewicz has graduated from Dutch studies at the University of Wrocław in 1999. That year she started diplomatic training at the Ministry of Foreign Affairs. She has been working on East Asia issues, congressional affairs and EU issues at the Embassy in Washington (2004–2008) and in Bucharest (2010–2015). In 2015, she became deputy director, and in 2017, she was promoted to the director of the Office of the Director General at the MFA headquarters.

In July 2018, she was appointed as Poland ambassador to Singapore. She presented her credentials to the President of Singapore Halimah Yacob on 24 August 2018. She ended her term on 18 August 2023. Between August 2023 and March 2026, she was director of the MFA Bureau for the Polish Presidency of the EU Council. In March 2026, she became deputy director of the MFA Department for Africa, the Middle East, and Latin America.

Besides her native Polish, she can speak English, German, Dutch and, to some extent, Romanian and French languages. She is married to Paweł Bogdziewicz. They have three children.
