= Tadeusz Chomicki =

Polish diplomat (born 1962)

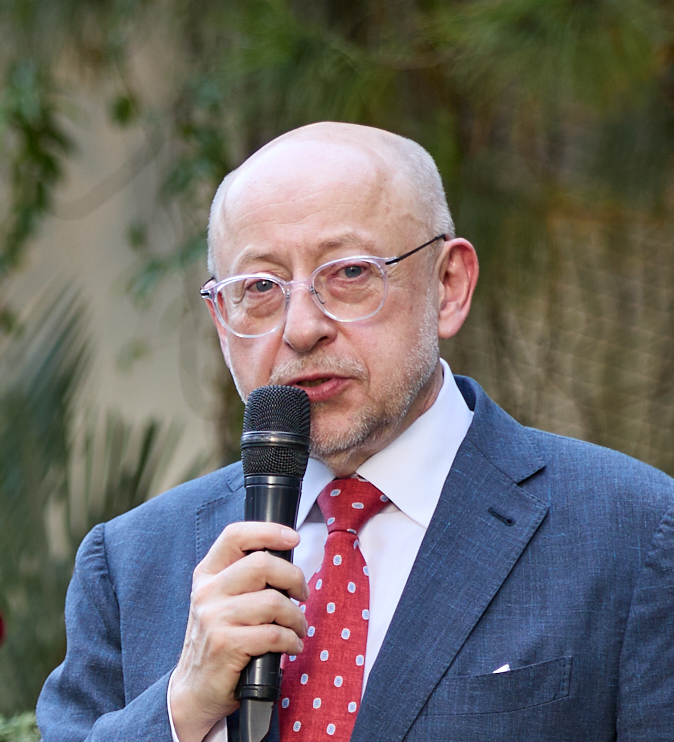
- Tadeusz Chomicki (2024)

Poland Ambassador to South Korea
- In office 2001–2005
- Preceded by: Janusz Świtkowski
- Succeeded by: Andrzej Derlatka

Poland Ambassador to China
- In office 2009–2015
- Preceded by: Krzysztof Szumski
- Succeeded by: Mirosław Gajewski

Poland Ambassador to Singapore
- Incumbent
- Assumed office 20th May 2025
- Preceded by: Magdalena Bogdziewicz

Personal details
- Born: 1962 (age 63–64) Warsaw
- Spouse: Susan Soo Kyung Kim-Chomicka
- Education: University of Warsaw
- Profession: Diplomat, sociologist

Tadeusz Jerzy Chomicki (born 1962) is a Polish sociologist and diplomat, specializing in relations with Asian countries and international security (especially demilitarisation, arms control, non-proliferation). Ambassador to South Korea (2001–2005), China (2009–2015), and Singapore (since 2025).

== Life ==
Chomicki graduated in 1986 from sociology at the University of Warsaw. He was educated also in sociology and philosophy at the Balliol College, Oxford (1987–1988), and in international relations at the European University Institute, Florence (1991–1992).

Between 1989 and 1992 he was teaching assistant at the University of Warsaw. In 1992, he joined the Ministry of Foreign Affairs, the Department of Africa, Asia, Australia and Oceania. In 1993, he was civil officer of the Polish Military Mission in Cambodia (UNTAC). In 1994, he became head of unit, and the following year, deputy director of the department. From 1998 to 2001, he was director of the MFA Department of Export Policy, responsible for export controls, defense industries cooperation, nonproliferation of weapons of mass destruction, and partially for arms control and disarmament. Between 2001 and 2005, he served as the ambassador to South Korea. Next, he was deputy director of the MFA Security Policy Department responsible for disarmament, nonproliferation, export controls and defense industries cooperation (2005–2007), director of the Minister's Office (2007–2008), and director of the MFA Asia and Pacific Department (2008–2009). In 2009, he was nominated ambassador to China, accredited also to Mongolia. He ended his mission on 15 July 2015. Next, he was working at the MFA Security Policy Department. In November 2024, he took the post of Chargé d'affaires to Singapore. In April 2025, he was nominated Ambassador to Singapore.

Member of the Oxford Society, Polish Sociological Association, and Polish-Chinese Education Foundation.

Married to Susan Soo Kyung Kim-Chomicka.

== Honours ==
- Officer of the Order of Polonia Restituta, Poland, 2015
- Silver Medal of Merit for National Defence, Poland
- Gold Medal of Merit for National Defence, Poland
- Badge "For merits for the development of the machine industry", Poland
- Order of Diplomatic Service Merit, 1st Class, South Korea
