= Waldemar Dubaniowski =

Polish diplomat

Waldemar J. Dubaniowski
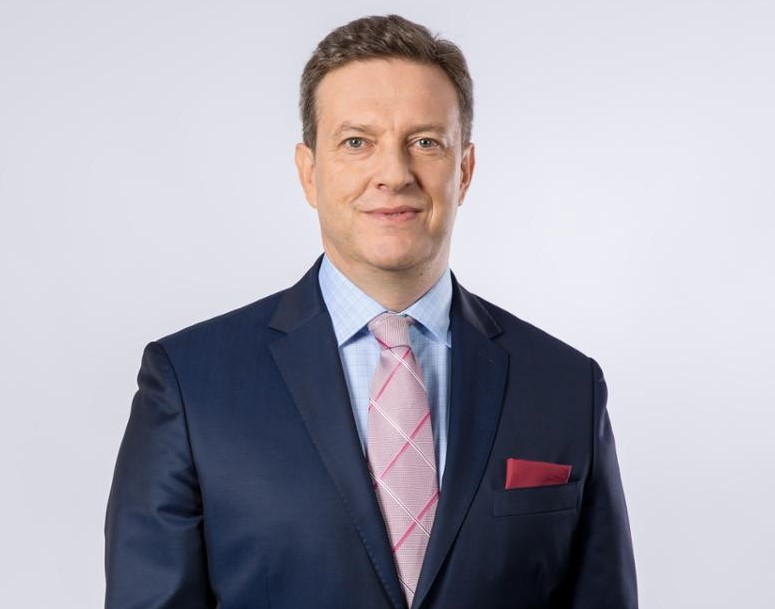

Poland Ambassador to Thailand
- In office November 2017 – 31 May 2023
- Preceded by: Zenon Kuchciak
- Succeeded by: Artur Dmochowski

Poland Ambassador to Singapore
- In office 26 March 2009 – 15 November 2013
- Preceded by: Bogusław Majewski
- Succeeded by: Zenon Kosiniak-Kamysz

Personal details
- Born: 23 February 1964 (age 62) Warsaw, Poland
- Education: University of Warsaw; National School of Public Administration
- Profession: Diplomat, Civil servant

Waldemar Jan Dubaniowski (born 23 February 1964 in Warsaw) is a Polish government official and diplomat; he served as an ambassador of Poland to Thailand, Laos, Cambodia, and Myanmar (2017–2023) and to Singapore (2009–2013); as a member of the National Broadcasting Council; a Chief of the Cabinet of the President of Poland and Secretary of State in the Chancellery of the President of the Republic of Poland.

== Biography ==
He graduated from the Institute of Social Sciences from Warsaw University. He became a graduate of the National School of Public Administration in 1993. He completed a postgraduate course at Warsaw School of Economics in foreign trade in 1997.

In the first half of the 1990s, he worked as an assistant secretary at the Ministry of Industry and Commerce, then in the Office of Government Plenipotentiary for European Integration and Foreign Assistance and Economic Committee of Council of Ministers. During 1996–1998, he served as the Group Director of the Cabinet of the President of the Republic of Poland. Until 2003, he was a member of the National Broadcasting Council. During 2005, he was the Chief of the Cabinet of the President of Poland.

From 2003 to 2009 he was the President of Polish Tennis Association.

In 2008, he was appointed an ambassador of the Republic of Poland to Singapore. He took this post in March 2009. As the ambassador to Singapore, he was also the Governor for Poland at Asia-Europe Foundation. In November 2013, he completed his mission and departed the post in Singapore.

In 2014 he was a director at PricewaterhouseCoopers in Warsaw. In the same year, he was appointed a member of the supervisory board of Polish State Railways.

In 2017, he was appointed an ambassador of the Republic of Poland to Thailand, Laos, Cambodia, and Myanmar, based in Bangkok. He took this post in September 2017. He ended his term on 31 May 2023.

In 2005 Dubaniowski was awarded the Officer's Cross of the Order of Polonia Restituta.

Besides Polish, he speaks English, German, and Russian.
