= Robert Kupiecki =

Polish diplomat

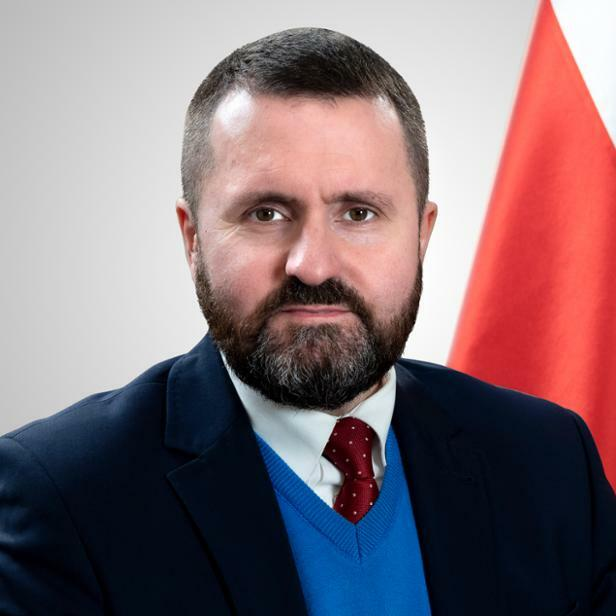
- Robert Kupiecki (2024)

Deputy Minister of National Defence
- In office 22 August 2012 – 2015

Personal details
- Born: 5 September 1967 (age 59) Warsaw, Poland
- Education: University of Warsaw
- Awards: Order of Polonia Restituta; Gold and Silver Medal of Merit for National Defence; Order for Merits to Lithuania; Order of the Cross of Terra Mariana

Robert Ryszard Kupiecki (born 5 September 1967) is a Polish diplomat. Since 2024, he has been serving as deputy minister of foreign affairs.

== Early life and education ==
Kupiecki was born in Warsaw. He received a master's degree from the Faculty of History at the University of Warsaw, and a PhD in political science. He also graduated from Poland's National School of Public Administration (Polish: Krajowa Szkoła Administracji Publicznej) and the Geneva Centre for Security Policy. In 2011 he defended his habilitation degree.

== Career ==
Kupiecki began working for the Ministry of Foreign Affairs in 1994. He was head of NATO and WEU Section from 1994 to 1998, and the deputy ambassador of Poland to NATO from 1999 to 2004. From 2004 to 2008, he served as the director of the security policy department. From 2008 to 2012, he served as Poland's ambassador to the United States.

Kupiecki was nominated for this post on 15 November 2007, and presented his letter of credence on 22 April 2008. On 22 August 2012, he was appointed Deputy Minister of National Defence, replacing Zbigniew Włosowicz. He works as a professor at the University of Warsaw Institute of International Relations. On 10 January 2024, Kupiecki was appointed as Undersecretary of State at the Ministry of Foreign Affairs.

== Honours ==
Kupiecki has received the Officer's Cross of Ment of the Republic of Lithuania, the Gold and Silver Medal "For the Services for the Country's Defense", and the Silver Medal of the Ministry of Foreign Affairs of the Republic of Slovakia. He is also the author and co-author of several books.
