= Paweł Wojciechowski =

Paweł Wojciechowski may refer to:

- Paweł Wojciechowski (economist), Polish economist
- Paweł Wojciechowski (footballer, born 1984), Polish footballer
- Paweł Wojciechowski (footballer, born 1990) (born 1990), Polish footballer
- Paweł Wojciechowski (pole vaulter), Polish pole vaulter

== See also ==
- Wojciechowski
