= Paweł Warszawski =

Polish equestrian

Personal information
- Nationality: Polish
- Born: 12 September 1981 (age 43); Poznań, Poland

Sport
- Country: Poland
- Sport: Equestrian

Paweł Warszawski (born 12 September 1981) is a Polish equestrian. He competed at various international championships representing the Polish team, including the World Breeding Championships and the European Championships. Warszawski has been selected by the Polish Equestrian Federation to represent the Polish eventing team at the 2024 Summer Olympics in Paris.
