= Paweł Wojciechowski (footballer, born 1984) =

Polish footballer

Personal information
- Full name: Paweł Wojciechowski
- Date of birth: 30 April 1984 (age 42)
- Place of birth: Zielona Góra, Poland
- Height: 1.80 m (5 ft 11 in)
- Position: Defender

Youth career
- LSPM Zielona Góra

Senior career*
Years	Team	Apps	(Gls)
2002–2003	Lech/Zryw Zielona Góra		
2003	Lech Zielona Góra		
2004–2005	Górnik Zabrze	34	(1)
2005–2007	Cracovia	17	(0)
2008	Polonia Bytom	10	(0)
2009	Lechia Zielona Góra	15	(0)
2009–2011	GKP Gorzów Wielkopolski	47	(1)
2011–2012	Olimpia Elbląg	19	(0)
2012	Lechia Zielona Góra	11	(0)
2012–2015	Grün-Weiß Piesteritz	87	(0)
2015–2022	SV Eintracht Elster	122	(12)

International career
2004–2005	Poland U21		
- * Club domestic league appearances and goals

Paweł Wojciechowski (born 30 April 1984) is a Polish former professional footballer who played as a defender.

== Career ==
=== Club ===
Wojciechowski began his youth career with LSPM Zielona Góra, before moving to Lech/Zryw Zielona Góra, with the team later changing its name Lech Zielona Góra. He later joined Górnik Zabrze. In the three years spent in Zabrze, he appeared in 34 league matches and scored 1 goal. Then he represented the colors of Cracovia for 3 years, making 17 top-tier appearances. Later, he moved to Polonia Bytom, for whom he made 10 outings. In 2009, Wojciechowski returned to Lechia Zielona Góra.

In May 2011, he joined Olimpia Elbląg.

== Honours ==
Olimpia Elbląg

- II liga East: 2010–11
