= List of ambassadors of Poland to China =

Coordinates: 39.912528°N 116.441750°E

Poland Ambassador to China
- Ambasador Rzeczypospolitej Polskiej w Chinach
- Coat of arms of Poland

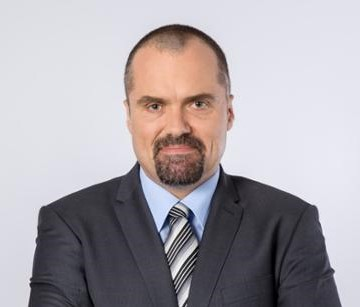
- Incumbent; Jakub Kumoch since September 2023
- Style: Mr. Ambassador (informal); His Excellency (diplomatic)
- Reports to: Polish Ministry of Foreign Affairs
- Seat: Beijing, China
- Nominator: President of Poland
- Inaugural holder: Józef Targowski
- Formation: 1920
- Website: Embassy of Poland, Beijing

The Republic of Poland Ambassador to China is the official representative of the Government of Poland to the Government of the People's Republic of China.

The Embassy of Poland, China is located in Beijing. In addition there are Consulates General located in Chengdu, Hong Kong, Guangzhou and Shanghai.

== List of ambassadors ==
Diplomatic agrément/Diplomatic accreditation	Ambassador	Observations	List of heads of state of Poland	Premier of the People's Republic of China	Term end
1920	Józef Targowski	Government delegate	Józef Piłsudski	Sa Zhenbing	1921
1921	Otton Sas-Hubicki	Consul in shanghai	Józef Piłsudski	Yan Huiqing	1922
1922	Karol Pindór	Consul, delegate plenipotentiary, since 1926 ambassador	Józef Piłsudski	Wang Ch'ung-hui	1928
1928	Konstanty Symonolewicz		Ignacy Mościcki	Tan Yankai	1930
November 11, 1931	Jerzy Barthel de Weydenthal	Chargé d'affaires	Ignacy Mościcki	Chiang Kai-shek	January 16, 1934
January 17, 1934	Jerzy Barthel de Weydenthal	envoy	Ignacy Mościcki	Wang Jingwei	May 1, 1939
1939	Andrzej Bohomolec	Chargé d'affaires	Bolesław Wieniawa-Długoszowski	H. H. Kung	
1939	Stanisław de Rosset	Chargé d'affaires	Bolesław Wieniawa-Długoszowski	H. H. Kung	1942
1942	Zygmunt Karpiński	Chargé d'affaires	Władysław Raczkiewicz	Chiang Kai-shek	1943
1943	Alfred Poniński	ambassador	Władysław Raczkiewicz	Chiang Kai-shek	1945
1945	Jan Fryling	representative of the Polish government-in-exile	Bolesław Bierut	Chiang Kai-shek	1949
1945	Michał Derenicz	Chargé d'affaires	Bolesław Bierut	Chiang Kai-shek	1946
1946	Stanisław Kostarski	Chargé d'affaires	Bolesław Bierut	Chiang Kai-shek	1948
1948	Konstanty Symonolewicz	Chargé d'affaires	Bolesław Bierut	Weng Wenhao	1949
October 27, 1949	Jan Jerzy Piankowski	Chargé d'affaires	Bolesław Bierut	Zhou Enlai	June 12, 1950
June 12, 1950	Juliusz Burgin		Bolesław Bierut	Zhou Enlai	1951
1952	Stanisław Kiryluk		Aleksander Zawadzki	Zhou Enlai	1959
1966	Witold Rodziński		Edward Ochab	Zhou Enlai	1969
1974	Franciszek Stachowiak		Henryk Jabłoński	Zhou Enlai	1975
1975	Bogumił Rychłowski		Henryk Jabłoński	Zhou Enlai	1980
1980	Władysław Wojtasik		Henryk Jabłoński	Zhao Ziyang	1984
1985	Zbigniew Dembowski		Wojciech Jaruzelski	Zhao Ziyang	1988
1988	Marian Woźniak		Wojciech Jaruzelski	Li Peng	1990
1990	Zbigniew Dembowski		Wojciech Jaruzelski	Li Peng	1994
1994	Zdzisław Góralczyk		Lech Wałęsa	Li Peng	1999
2000	Ksawery Burski		Aleksander Kwaśniewski	Zhu Rongji	2004
2005	Zbigniew Dembowski		Aleksander Kwaśniewski	Wen Jiabao	2009
2009	Tadeusz Chomicki		Lech Kaczyński	Wen Jiabao	June 30, 2015
July 1, 2015	Mirosław Gajewski		Andrzej Duda	Li Keqiang	2017
January 2018	Wojciech Zajączkowski		Andrzej Duda	Li Keqiang	18 August 2023
6 September 2023	Jakub Kumoch		Andrzej Duda	Li Qiang	
