= Mariusz Woźniak =

Polish diplomat (1944–2020)

Poland Ambassador to Indonesia
- In office 1991–1995
- Succeeded by: Ksawery Burski

Poland Ambassador to Jordan
- In office 1999–2003
- Preceded by: Bogusław Rękas
- Succeeded by: Andrzej Biera

Poland Ambassador to Ethiopia
- In office 2005–2007
- Preceded by: Krzysztof Suprowicz
- Succeeded by: Jarosław Szczepankiewicz

Personal details
- Born: March 4, 1944 Warsaw
- Died: 4 November 2020 (aged 76) Warsaw
- Education: University of Warsaw
- Profession: Diplomat

Mariusz Woźniak (4 March 1944 – 4 November 2020) was a Polish diplomat, ambassador to Indonesia (1991–1995), Jordan (1999–2003), and Ethiopia (2005–2007).

== Life ==
Woźniak graduated from English studies at the University of Warsaw. In 1981, he started his diplomatic career at the Ministry of Foreign Affairs as expert. He served at the embassies in Washington, D.C. (1981–1982), as First Secretary in Tokyo (1983–1987). Between 1991 and 1995, he represented Poland as ambassador to Indonesia. Next, from 1999 to 2003, he was ambassador to Jordan. Following his short stay at the diplomatic protocol in Warsaw, he ended his career as ambassador in Ethiopia (2005–2007).

Besides Polish, he was speaking English and Russian.
