= Wojciech Zajączkowski =

Polish politician

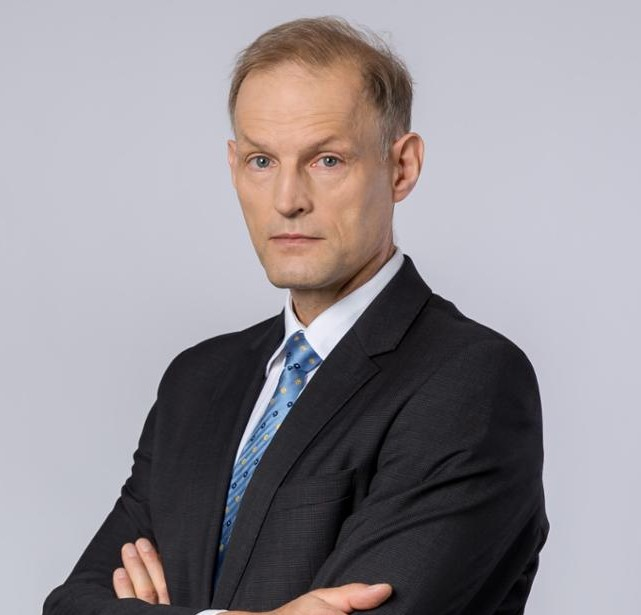

Poland Ambassador to China
- In office January 2018 – 18 August 2023
- Appointed by: Andrzej Duda
- Leader: Xi Jinping
- Preceded by: Mirosław Gajewski
- Succeeded by: Jakub Kumoch

Poland Ambassador to Russia
- In office 2010–2014
- Appointed by: Bronisław Komorowski
- President: Vladimir Putin; Dmitry Medvedev
- Preceded by: Jerzy Bahr
- Succeeded by: Katarzyna Pełczyńska-Nałęcz

Poland Ambassador to Romania
- In office 2008–2010
- Appointed by: Lech Kaczyński
- President: Traian Băsescu
- Preceded by: Jacek Paliszewski
- Succeeded by: Marek Szczygieł

Personal details
- Born: December 19, 1963 (age 62) Bydgoszcz, Poland
- Spouse: Izabella Zajączkowska
- Children: three
- Education: Catholic University of Lublin
- Profession: Diplomat, historian
- Awards

Wojciech Jacek Zajączkowski (born 19 December 1963 in Bydgoszcz) is a Polish diplomat and historian. Since 2025 he is serving as Underseceretary of State at the Ministry of Foreign Affairs. Prior to that he was Ambassador of Poland to China (2018–2023), Russia (2010–2014), and Romania (2008–2010).

== Life ==
=== Education ===
Wojciech Zajączkowski graduated from history at the Catholic University of Lublin in 1987. In 1999 he defended at the Institute of Political Studies of the Polish Academy of Sciences his PhD thesis on ethnic minorities in 19th-century Russia and USSR.

=== Career ===
Till the early 1990s he has been working as an editor. From 1991 to 1998 for the Centre for Eastern Studies as an analyst, Senate of Poland as an advisor, Stefan Batory Foundation as a director of the Central-Eastern Europe Forum. In 1998 he joined the Polish diplomatic service, working at the embassy in Moscow. In 2000 he became chargé d’affaires in Ukraine, responsible for Turkmenistan as well. From 2004 to 2007 he headed the Department for Eastern Policy at the Polish Ministry of Foreign Affairs, and in 2008 he became the Chief Advisor to the Prime Minister of Poland and Head of the Working Group on Energy Security. He served as the Poland ambassador to Romania (2008–2010) and Russia (2010–2014). Later, he was the Director of the Department of Foreign Policy Strategy at the MFA (2014–2018).

In January 2018 he became the Republic of Poland Ambassador to the People's Republic of China. He presented his credentials to the General Secretary of the Chinese Communist Party Xi Jinping on 23 March 2018. He ended his term on 18 August 2023. Between September 2023 and January 2024, he held the post of the deputy director of the MFA Asia-Pacific Department. Since 10 January 2024, he was the director of this Department. From 2024, he was simultaneously in charge of the Eastern Department. On 6 August 2025, he was nominated Undersecretary of State at the Ministry of Foreign Affairs.

=== Private life ===
Wojciech Zajączkowski is married to Izabella Zajączkowska, with three children. Besides his native Polish, he speaks English, French, Romanian, Russian and Ukrainian.

== Awards ==
In 2009 he received the Romanian National Order of Faithful Service.

== Works ==
- Federacja czy rozpad Rosji?, Warszawa: Ośrodek Studiów Wschodnich, 1994.
- W poszukiwaniu tożsamości społecznej. Inteligencja baszkirska, buriacka i tatarska wobec kwestii narodowej w Cesarstwie Rosyjskim i ZSRR. Lublin: IESW, 2001. ISBN 8385854681.
- Czy Rosja przetrwa do roku 2000, Warszawa: Oficyna Wydawnicza MOST, 1993.
- Rosja i narody. Ósmy kontynent, Szkic dziejów Eurazji, Warszawa: Wydawnictwo MG, 2009.
  - Czech translation by Petruška Šustrová: Rusko a národy: Osmý kontinent, Misgurnus 2011. ISBN 978-80-904931-0-0.
- Zrozumieć innych. Metoda analityczna w polityce zagranicznej. Warszawa: Krajowa Szkoła Administracji Publicznej, 2011. ISBN 978-83-61713-37-1.
- Rozumieć politykę międzynarodową. Metody analizy źródeł otwartych. Warszawa: Ośrodek Studiów Wschodnich, Wydawnictwo Scholar, 2025. ISBN 978-83-68091-26-7.
