= John Wozniak (disambiguation) =

John Wozniak (born 1971) is an American musician and member of the band Marcy Playground.

John Wozniak may also refer to

- John Wozniak (gridiron football) (1921–1982), American football player
- John Wozniak (American football coach) (born 1977), American football coach
- John N. Wozniak (born 1956), state senator in the U.S. state of Pennsylvania
