= Bieniaszowice =

- Village
- Location within Poland
- Coordinates: 50°13′N 20°46′E
- Country: Poland
- Voivodeship: Lesser Poland
- County: Dąbrowa
- Gmina: Gręboszów

Bieniaszowice [bjɛɲaʂɔˈvit͡sɛ] is a village in the administrative district of Gmina Gręboszów, within Dąbrowa County, Lesser Poland Voivodeship, in southern Poland.
