= National School of Public Administration (Poland) =

Public administration school in Warsaw, Poland

Coordinates: 52.2166°N 20.9898°E

The National School of Public Administration named after the President of the Republic of Poland, Lech Kaczyński (Polish: Krajowa Szkoła Administracji Publicznej im. Prezydenta Rzeczypospolitej Polskiej Lecha Kaczyńskiego, abbreviated as KSAP) was established in 1990 by the Tadeusz Mazowiecki government. An inspiration for its founders was the French École nationale d’administration. The aim of the school is to train civil servants for the public administration of the Republic of Poland. The school is located in Warsaw.

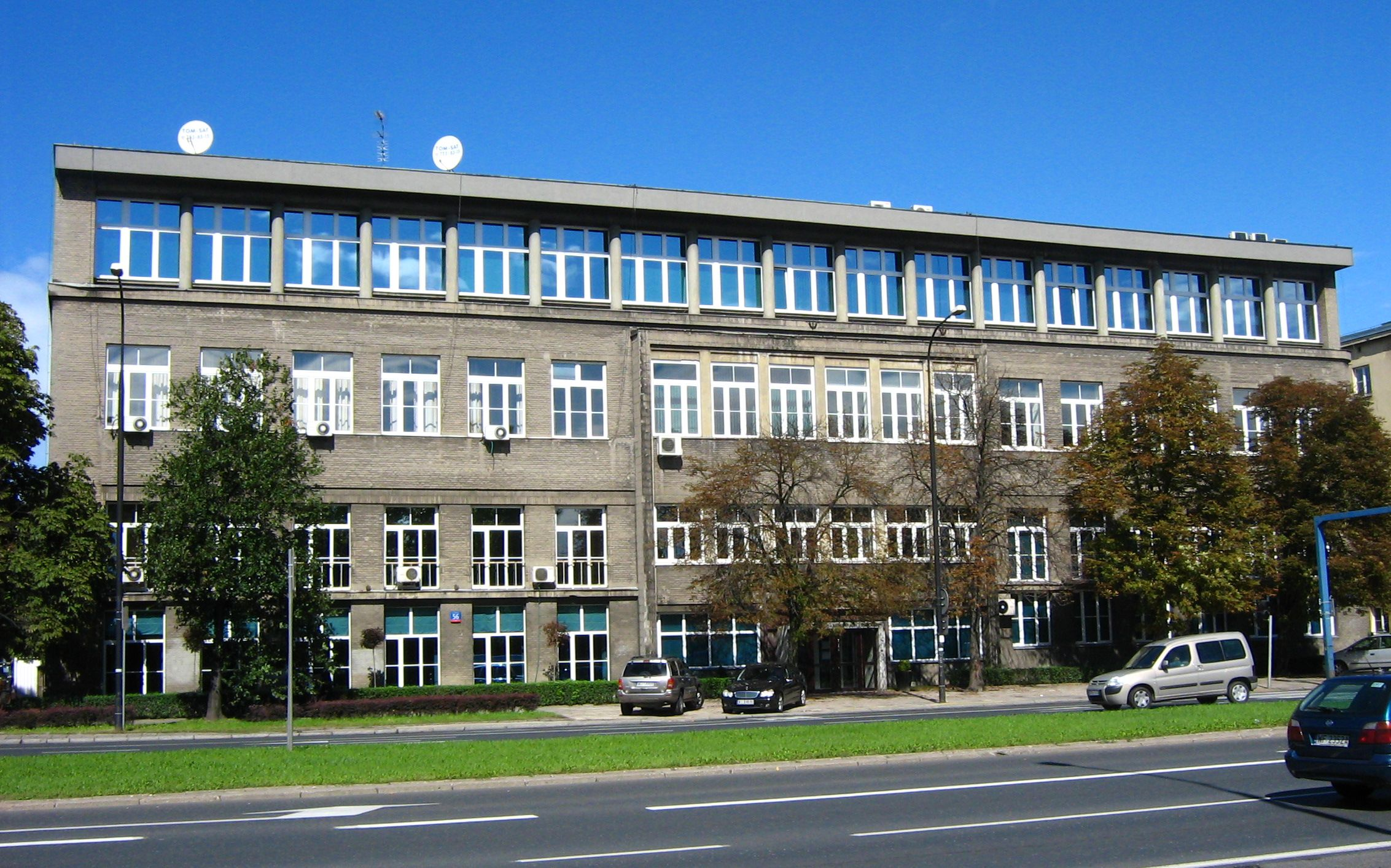
National School of Public Administration

Training at the school lasts from 18 to 20 months. The programme is focused on the following learning paths: law and administration; economics and public finance; the European Union and foreign policy; management and soft skills development. Students do two internships in Poland and one abroad (usually in the European Union country).

== History ==
The National School of Public Administration was established on 30 May 1990 by a resolution of the Polish Council of Ministers. As in the École nationale d’administration, every students’ year chooses their respective name and is called a "promotion". So far there have been 35 promotions. Since 2014 there have been 30–40 students finishing their education at the school each year. Most graduates work in Polish ministries.

A founder and long-time director of the school was lawyer Prof. Maria Gintowt-Jankowicz. From 2012 to 2016, Jan Pastwa, a former Ambassador of Poland to the Czech Republic and KSAP graduate, was KSAP director. Former Minister of Foreign Affairs of Poland Jacek Czaputowicz was director of the school from 2008 to 2012. In June 2024 Małgorzata Bywanis-Jodlińska, herself a graduate of KSAP, was nominated director.

The school was the first establishment of its kind in a former Communist country. KSAP cooperates with public administration schools in other countries, providing partners in Ukraine, Afghanistan, or Myanmar) with training and workshops.

== Alumni ==
There have been over 1400 graduates of KSAP so far. The best-known alumnus of the School is Elżbieta Bieńkowska, a former European Commissioner for Internal Market, Industry, Entrepreneurship and SMEs, who formerly served as Minister for Infrastructure and Development of Poland, as well as Deputy Prime Minister in the Donald Tusk cabinet.

Other alumni are Mariusz Błaszczak, a former Minister of Defence, Władysław Stasiak, a former Minister of Interior and Administration in Jarosław Kaczyński Cabinet, Robert Kupiecki, a Deputy Foreign Minister and former Polish ambassador in the United States, Waldemar Dubaniowski, a former member of the National Broadcasting Council, a former secretary of state and a Polish ambassador in Thailand.

There exists an alumni association: the Association of KSAP Graduates (Stowarzyszenie Absolwentów KSAP).
