= Witold Rodziński =

Polish historian, sinologist, and diplomat (1918–1997)

Poland Ambassador to the United Kingdom
- In office 1960–1965
- Preceded by: Eugeniusz Milnikiel
- Succeeded by: Jerzy Morawski

Poland Ambassador to China
- In office 1966–1969
- Preceded by: Stanisław Kiryluk
- Succeeded by: Franciszek Stachowiak

Personal details
- Born: 5 October 1918 Lemberg, Austrian Galicia, Austria-Hungary
- Died: 18 December 1997 (aged 79)
- Education: Columbia University
- Profession: Diplomat, historian, sinologist

Witold Rodziński (5 October 1918 – 18 December 1997) was a Polish historian, sinologist and diplomat.

== Biography ==
Rodziński was born on 5 October 1918 in Lemberg, Austrian Galicia (present-day Lviv, Ukraine) to a Polish father and a German mother. His father, Artur Rodziński, was a conductor and his mother, Ilse Reimesch, was a pianist.

He studied at the Columbia University, was an official at the United Nations 1945–47, and adviser in the Ministry of Foreign Affairs 1947–48, a researcher at the Institute of Social Sciences and the Central Committee of the Higher School of Pedagogy in Warsaw.

From 1958 to 1971 he was assistant professor at the Department of History of the University of Warsaw.

He was the Polish Ambassador to the United Kingdom 1960–65 and to the People's Republic of China 1966–69.

Rodziński was the author of the monumental History of China, published in English as The Walled Kingdom: A History of China from Antiquity to the Present.

On 18 December 1997, Rodziński died aged 79.
