= Pawel Anaszkiewicz =

Polish-Mexican artist

- Born: Gdynia, Poland
- Occupation: Artist

Pawel Anaszkiewicz, born in Gdynia, Poland, is a Polish-Mexican artist. He is a visual artist working with video-installations and sculptures. His video-installations are confronting real and projected spaces. In sculpture he is working with big pieces of rusted metal, and his conception of metal and the space surrounding it is that of two element embracing each other. He is currently working as a professor at the Universidad Autónoma del Estado Morelo's Facultad de Artes Plasticas at Cuernavaca.
