= Pawel Hawrylak =

Polish-Canadian physicist

- Occupations: Theoretical physicist; academic
- Awards: Fellow of the American Physical Society (1996); Fellow of the Royal Society of Canada (2006); Humboldt Research Award (1999; 2023); Canadian Association of Physicists Brockhouse Medal (2002)

Academic background
- Education: Wrocław University of Science and Technology (MSc); University of Kentucky (PhD)
- Thesis: Condensed matter theory

Academic work
- Discipline: Physics
- Sub-discipline: Theoretical condensed matter
- Institutions: National Research Council Canada; University of Ottawa
- Main interests: Theoretical and computational studies of low-dimensional and nanostructured materials

Pawel Hawrylak is a Polish-Canadian physicist who works in theoretical condensed matter physics, with research interests including low-dimensional and nanostructured materials and light–matter interaction at the nanoscale.

== Education ==
Hawrylak received an MSc in physics from Wroclaw University of Science and Technology (1979) and a PhD in condensed matter theory with Kumbke Subbaswamy from the University of Kentucky in 1984 with thesis on intercalated graphite.

== Career ==
After postdoctoral work with J.J. Quinn at Brown University, Hawrylak joined the National Research Council of Canada in Ottawa in 1987, later becoming a principal research officer and leader of a quantum theory group. In 2014, he joined the University of Ottawa as a professor of physics and held a university research chair in quantum theory of materials, nano-structures and devices (2014–2024).

Hawrylak has served as an executive editor of Solid State Communications.

== Research ==
Hawrylak's research includes theoretical and computational studies of low-dimensional and nanostructured materials, including light–matter interaction at the nanoscale (nanophotonics) and spin-related effects in semiconductor and graphene nanostructures (spintronics). His work on quantum dots included theoretical studies of excitonic effects and "artificial atom" models for self-assembled quantum dots. Related work includes studies of addition spectra and spin blockade in lateral quantum dots. He has also worked on graphene-based nanostructures, including graphene quantum dots.

== Awards and honours ==
In 1996, Hawrylak was elected a Fellow of the American Physical Society, and in 2006 was elected a Fellow of the Royal Society of Canada. He received an Humboldt Research Award in 1998 and again in 2023, and the Canadian Association of Physicists Brockhouse Medal in 2002. In 2012, Hawrylak was awarded a Queen Elizabeth II Diamond Jubilee Medal and, in 2014, an honorary doctorate from the University of Crete.

== Selected publications ==
- Hawrylak, P. (1991). "Optical properties of a two-dimensional electron gas: Evolution of spectra from excitons to Fermi-edge singularities". Physical Review B. 44 (8): 3821.
- Hawrylak, P. (1993). "Single Electron Capacitance Spectroscopy of Artificial Atoms: Theory and Experiment". Physical Review Letters. 71: 3347.
- Ciorga, M.; Sachrajda, A. S.; Hawrylak, P.; Gould, C.; Zawadzki, P.; Jullian, S.; Feng, Y.; Wasilewski, Z. (2000). "Addition spectrum of a lateral dot from Coulomb and spin-blockade spectroscopy". Physical Review B. 61: R16315.
- Bayer, M.; Hawrylak, P.; Hinzer, K.; Fafard, S.; Korkusinski, M.; Wasilewski, Z. R.; Stern, O.; Forchel, A. (2001). "Coupling and entangling of quantum states in quantum dot molecules". Science. 291: 451.
- Hawrylak, P. (1999). "Excitonic artificial atoms: engineering optical properties of quantum dots". Physical Review B. 60: 5597.
- Bayer, M.; Ortner, G.; Stern, O.; Kuther, A.; Gorbunov, A. A.; Forchel, A.; Hawrylak, P.; Fafard, S.; Hinzer, K.; Reinecke, T. L.; Walck, S. N.; Reithmaier, J. P.; Klopf, F.; Schäfer, F. (2002). "Fine structure of neutral and charged excitons in self-assembled In(Ga)As/(Al)GaAs quantum dots". Physical Review B. 65: 195315.
- Bayer, M.; Stern, O.; Hawrylak, P.; Fafard, S.; Forchel, A. (2000). "Hidden symmetries in the energy levels of excitonic artificial atoms in quantum dots". Nature. 405: 923.
- Jacak, Lucjan; Hawrylak, Pawel; Wójs, Arek (1998). Quantum Dots. Berlin: Springer.
- Güçlü, Devrim; Potasz, Pawel; Korkusinski, Marek; Hawrylak, Pawel (2014). Graphene Quantum Dots. Berlin: Springer.
- Kadantsev, E. S.; Hawrylak, P. (2012). "Electronic structure of a single MoS2 monolayer". Solid State Communications. 152 (10): 909–913.
- Korkusinski, Marek; Saleem, Yasser; Dusko, Amintor; Miravet, Daniel; Hawrylak, Pawel (2023). "Spontaneous spin and valley symmetry broken states of interacting massive Dirac Fermions in a bilayer graphene quantum dot". Nano Letters. 23: 7546.
