= Mexico–Guatemala conflict =

1958-59 armed dispute between Mexico and Guatemala

- Part of Guatemala–Mexico relations
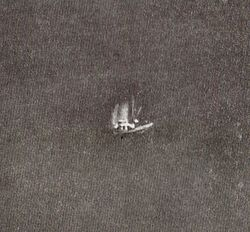
- Mexican fishing vessel San Diego takes a direct hit from Guatemalan fire.
Date	30 December 1958 – 15 September 1959 (8 months, 2 weeks and 2 days)
Location	Mexican and Guatemalan waters off the Pacific coast of Mexico, Guatemala–Mexico border
Result	Ceasefire: Relations between the two nations were frozen for several months

Belligerents
Guatemala	Mexico

Commanders and leaders
Miguel Ydígoras Fuentes; Luis de León Urrutia	Adolfo López Mateos; Alfonso Cruz Rivera

Strength
2 P-51 Mustang fighter planes 1 Douglas C-47 Skytrain; 1 Cessna 180	(Mexico) 8 fishing boats

Casualties and losses
	(Mexico) 3 civilian fishermen dead and 14 wounded

In an armed conflict between the countries of Mexico and Guatemala, the Guatemalan Air Force fired upon Mexican civilian fishing boats within Guatemalan territory. Hostilities were set in motion during the presidency of Miguel Ydígoras Fuentes on March 2, 1958.

== Background ==
Since November 1956 the Guatemalan and Mexican governments had quarreled over the crossing of the Guatemalan border by Mexican citizens. On November 8, 1957, the Guatemalan Foreign Minister, Adolfo Orantes, sent a diplomatic letter to the Mexican government which detailed the complaints of the Guatemalan government. Orantes said that Mexican shrimping boats were frequently crossing the nautical border into Guatemala to fish. He also reported that trees were being cut down by Mexican workers in the northernmost Guatemalan province of Petén. As protests in Guatemala City spoke out against the policies of the government, newly elected President Ydígoras sought to set up faux nationalist causes in order to quell the spread of more civil unrest.

The President's administration capitalized on the complaints filed by the Foreign Minister several months prior. Ydígoras voiced concerns regarding illegal Mexican forays into Guatemala to the Mexican government; such concerns were met with a diplomatic note from the Mexican Secretariat of Foreign Affairs, which stated that it could simply do nothing to identify the crews of fishing vessels that crossed the border, despite the strong presence of the Mexican Navy in the region.

== The conflict ==
=== Preparation ===
The commander of the Guatemalan Air Force (Spanish: Fuerza Aérea Guatemalteca, or FAG), Luis de Leon Urrutia, was ordered to develop a plan to locate and destroy foreign ships in Guatemalan territory. Less than 24 hours preceding the order, a team formed by Urrutia had come up with Operation Drake, which, on December 30, was both approved and called to action by Ydígoras.

=== Commencement of violence ===
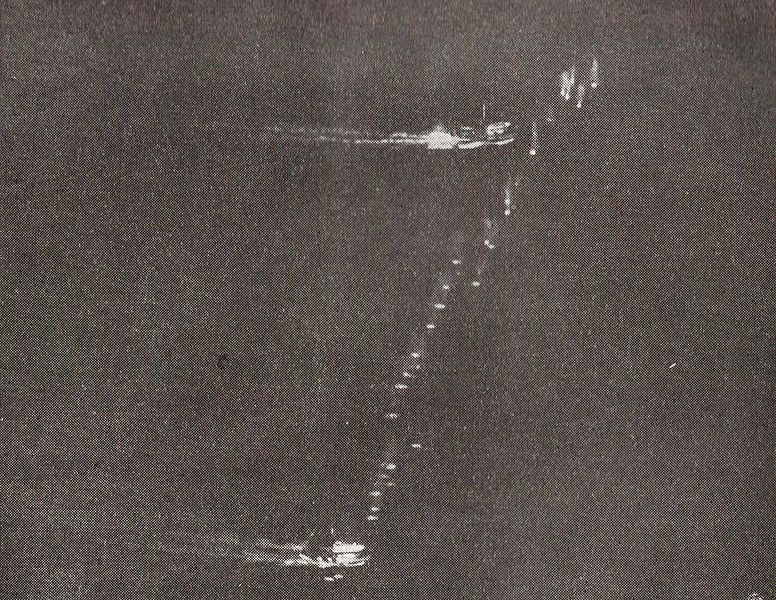
A Mustang fires warning shots

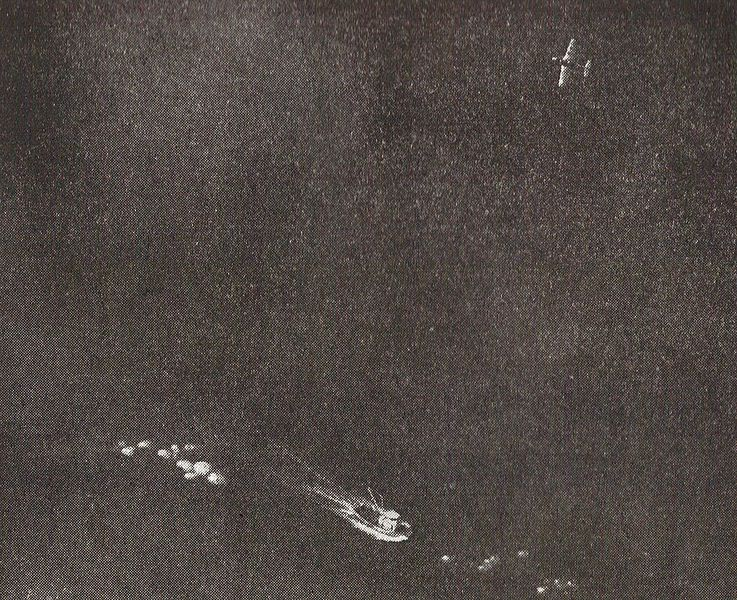
A Mustang fires warning shots as another Mustang overflies the location

On the afternoon of December 30, 1958, a group of Guatemalan AT-6 Texan aircraft surveyed the scene of the reported fishing to ensure the Mexican vessels were still there. The following morning, a flight of one Cessna 180, one C-47 and two P-51 Mustangs took off from the Guatemalan mainland and observed a group of eight Mexican fishing boats. Five of the eight were a mere 2.5–3 kilometres (1 1/2–2 mi) off the coast of the Guatemalan municipality of Champerico. The fishermen responded to the arrival of the fighter-bombers with jeers and obscene gestures.

When one boat, the Elizabeth, made a move for the Mexican border, the planes strafed the ships with their machine guns. By the time the shooting had ceased, three fishermen were left dead and fourteen were rendered stranded and wounded in Guatemalan territory.

== Aftermath ==
=== Rescue and captivity of sailors ===
After the sortie, one Cessna aircraft of the FAG landed on a nearby abandoned air field and verified that there were injuries and called in the support of a C-47 transport aircraft to evacuate them to a military hospital within Guatemala. The remaining fishermen, who had tried to escape the strafing planes by leaping and swimming away from the scene, were picked up by two Guatemalan tugboats within six hours of the incident. Eventually, all fishermen were transported to a military base in Mazatenango and interrogated by Guatemalan military officials. In January 1959, the Mexican Ambassador to Guatemala demanded the release of the fishermen. On January 22, 1959, a Guatemalan court released the fishermen, imposing a fine of 55 quetzals on them. The following day, January 23, Mexican president Adolfo López Mateos terminated diplomatic relations with the Republic of Guatemala.

=== Border tensions ===
Within days of the attack, both Mexican and Guatemalan troops were mobilized to the 871-kilometre-long (541 mi) Guatemala–Mexico border. Mexican forces tore down a bridge which connected the two countries upon the severing of connections with the Guatemalan government.

== Resolution ==
In the days prior to and proceeding the release of the Mexican fishermen, Ydígoras frequently made pleas to the media and the United Nations, insisting that Mexico had been planning an invasion of Guatemala, and that the fishermen were "pirates".

Ydígoras, growing increasingly paranoid about the communist takeover in Cuba, focused much of his attention on building up home defenses in case of a Cuban invasion, as well as becoming more friendly with the United States. This perceived new threat led to the withdrawal of most Guatemalan forces from the border region within weeks of their arrival.

In his address to the Congress of the Union on September 1, 1959, Mexican President López retold the episode and expressed his desire to mend the broken link between Guatemala and Mexico. On September 15, 1959, during a speech regarding the 149th anniversary of the Grito de Dolores, Adolfo López Mateos announced that, through mediation on both sides, Guatemala and Mexico were reestablishing relations. Soon afterwards, Guatemala compensated the families of the injured and dead fishermen and formally apologized for the incident.

== See also ==
- Military history of Mexico
