= Embassy of Israel, Mexico City =

The Embassy of Israel in Mexico City is the diplomatic mission of Israel in Mexico. It is located at Sierra Madre No. 215 in the Miguel Hidalgo borough of the city.

== History ==
Mexico recognized Israel in 1949 and both nations established formal diplomatic relations on 1 July 1952.

In May 2024, protests erupted in support of Palestine during the Gaza war and the embassy was set on fire.

== See also ==
- Israel–Mexico relations
