= Israel–Mexico relations =

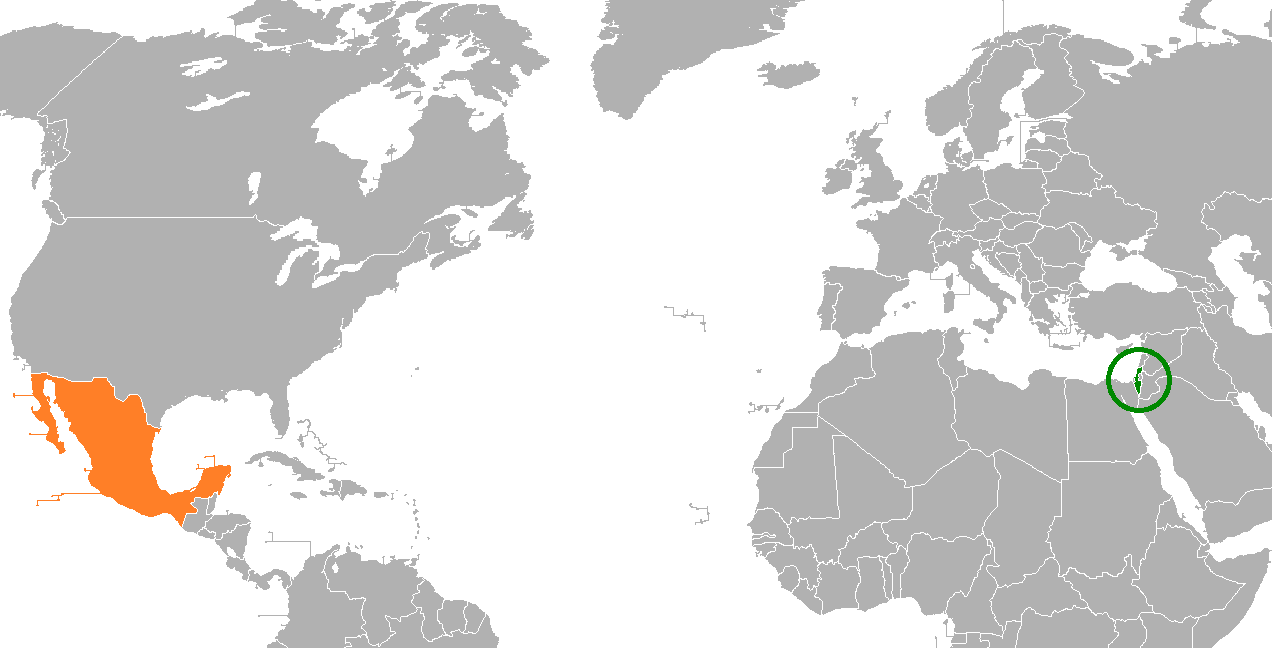

- Israel: Mexico

The nations of Israel and Mexico established diplomatic relations in 1952. Both nations are members of the Organisation for Economic Co-operation and Development, the United Nations and the World Trade Organization.

== History ==
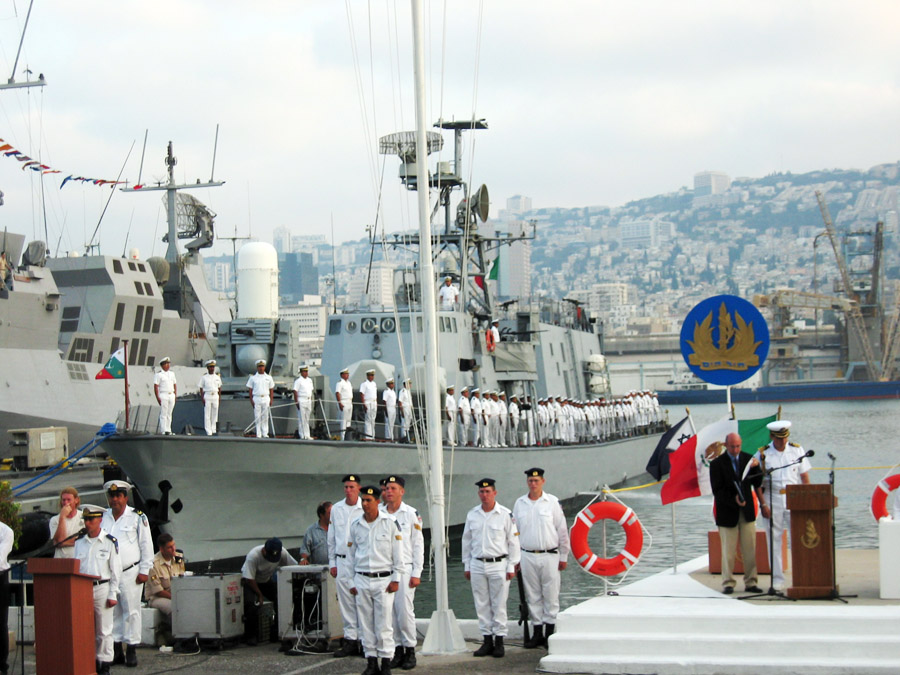
Ceremony of the transfer of two Israeli Navy Sa'ar 4.5-class missile boats to the Mexican Navy in 2004

During the Partition of Palestine in November 1947, Mexico was one of ten countries to abstain from voting on the partition. Mexico recognized Israel in 1949 and both nations established formal diplomatic relations on 1 July 1952. Both nations have opened embassies in each other's countries, with Mexico opening its embassy in Tel Aviv in 1959. That same year, Israeli foreign minister Golda Meir paid a visit to Mexico.

In 1975, Mexican president Luis Echeverría paid a state visit to Israel. This was in part due to a desire to amend relations after the passing of UN Resolution 3379 pushed by the Non-Aligned Movement, along with Arab countries and the Soviet bloc, which was a declarative nonbinding measure equating Zionism with South Africa's Apartheid and a form of racial discrimination. This process was a manifestation of Cold War bipolar logic. The bloc voting produced a majority in the United Nations that systematically condemned Israel in the following resolutions: 3089, 3210, 3236, 32/40 and others. The resolution took place in light of Third World politics promoted by political figures such as Mexican president Echeverría. He used the World Conference on Women, 1975 as a platform to build his own figure among the Non-Aligned Movement and looking forward to be Secretary-General of the United Nations. This resulted in a touristic boycott of the American Jewish community against Mexico, which made visible internal and external conflicts of Echeverría's politics. UN resolution 46/86 finally revoked resolution 3379 in 1991.

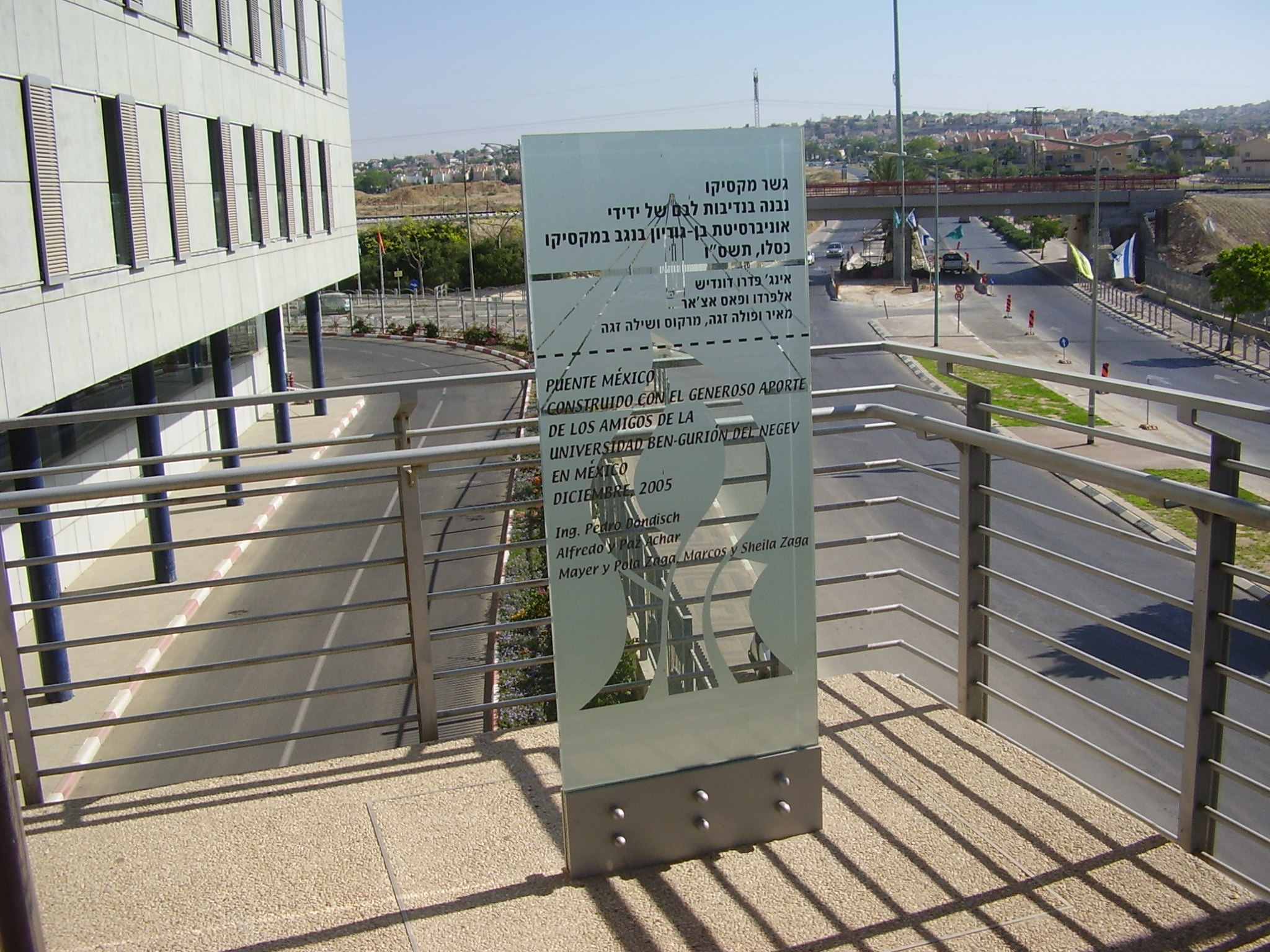
A plaque dedicating a bridge to Mexico at the Be'er Sheva North Railway Station

In 1977, Israeli president Ephraim Katzir paid a visit to Mexico where he met with President José López Portillo. In 2000, Mexican president Ernesto Zedillo also paid a state visit to Israel. During his stay in Israel, President Zedillo met with Israeli president Ezer Weizman and both leaders signed a Free Trade Agreement between both nations, with the aim of expanding productive ties and business ties.

Over the years, Mexico and Israel have increased military cooperation. In 2008, Mexico purchased US$210 million of Israeli military equipment. There are also several cultural and touristic interchanges between both nations. In October 2013, the Mexican Congress installed a section in their building dedicated to 'Mexico-Israel Friendship'.

In September 2016, Mexican president Enrique Peña Nieto attended the funeral of former Israeli president, Shimon Peres, held at the National Cemetery Mount Herzl, in Jerusalem. President Peña Nieto was accompanied by the then foreign minister, Claudia Ruiz Massieu, as well as members of the Jewish Community in Mexico.

On 13 September 2017, Israeli Prime Minister Benjamin Netanyahu paid an official three day visit to Mexico and met with President Enrique Peña Nieto and members of the Jewish-Mexican community. Prime Minister Netanyahu became the first Israeli head of government to visit Mexico and Latin America. Relations between both nations had been slightly tense since Prime Minister Netanyahu tweeted in January 2017 that he backed U.S. president Donald Trump’s plan to build a border wall between Mexico and the United States. A few days before Prime Minister Netanyahu's visit, IsraAid sent humanitarian supplies to the earthquake stricken region of the Mexican states of Chiapas and Oaxaca after an 8.1 earthquake hit the area on 7 September 2017. During Prime Minister Netanyahu's visit, both nations signed agreements on aviation, in the hopes of establishing direct flights between both nations; international development, specifically cooperation in international development that will focus on relevant development issues including water, agriculture, initiatives and innovation; and a space agreement to create the legal infrastructure for cooperation in the uses of outer space for peaceful purposes.

Mariachi musicians commemorating 70 years of diplomatic relations between Mexico and Israel; 2022.

In July 2022, both nations celebrated 70 years of diplomatic relations. To commemorate, the two countries issued a joint stamp. For its part, Mexico presented a commemorative exhibition of both nations historical relations within Mexico's diplomatic academy of Instituto Matías Romero.

In 2023, it was discovered that Mexico was the "first and most prolific" user of Israel's Pegasus Spyware system.

In the aftermath of Hamas' attack on Israel on October 7th, Mexico condemned the attacks. During the ensuing conflict, Mexico has maintained a moderate posture with Israel, in comparison to other Hispanic America's countries such as Colombia and Chile, calling for a cessation of hostilities while committing to keeping its embassy in Israel open. On 18 January 2024, Mexico announced support for investigation into Israeli war crimes in Gaza by the International Criminal Court after reviewing UN reports and the South Africa's genocide case against Israel. In September 2025, Mexican President Claudia Sheinbaum called Israel's actions in Gaza a genocide during a press conference, becoming one of the only Western leaders to do so.

== High-level visits ==
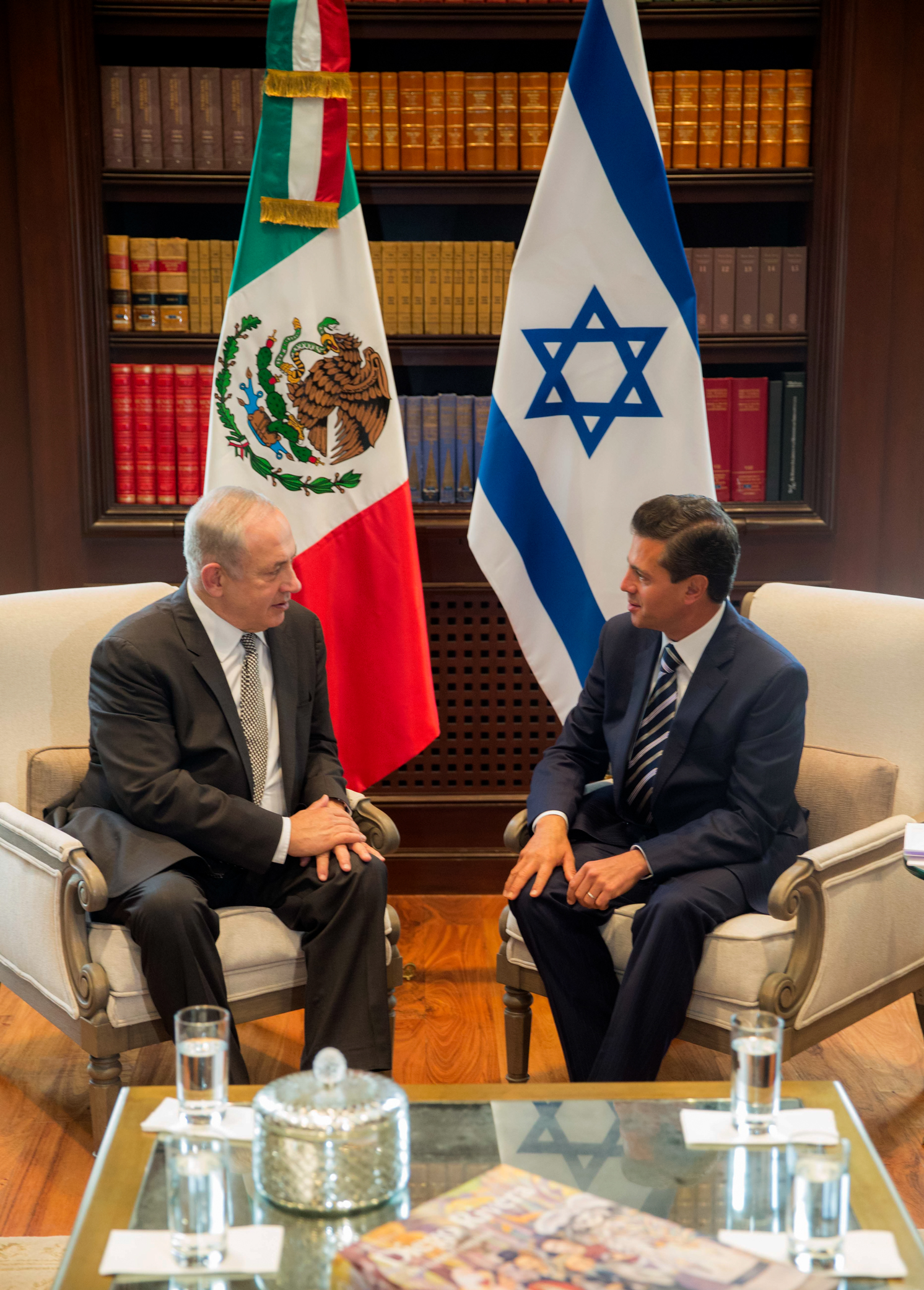
Israeli Prime Minister Benjamin Netanyahu and Mexican President Enrique Peña Nieto in Mexico City, 2017.

High-level visits from Israel to Mexico

- Foreign Minister Golda Meir (1959)
- Foreign Minister Yigal Allon (1976)
- President Ephraim Katzir (1977)
- Foreign Minister Moshe Arens (1990)
- Foreign Minister Shimon Peres (1994)
- President Moshe Katsav (2002)
- President Shimon Peres (2013)
- Prime Minister Benjamin Netanyahu (2017)

High-level visits from Mexico to Israel

- President Luis Echeverría (1975)
- Foreign Minister Emilio Óscar Rabasa Mishkin (1975)
- President Ernesto Zedillo (2000)
- Foreign Minister Rosario Green (2000)
- Foreign Undersecretary Lourdes Aranda (2009)
- President Enrique Peña Nieto (2016)
- Foreign Minister Claudia Ruiz Massieu (2016)

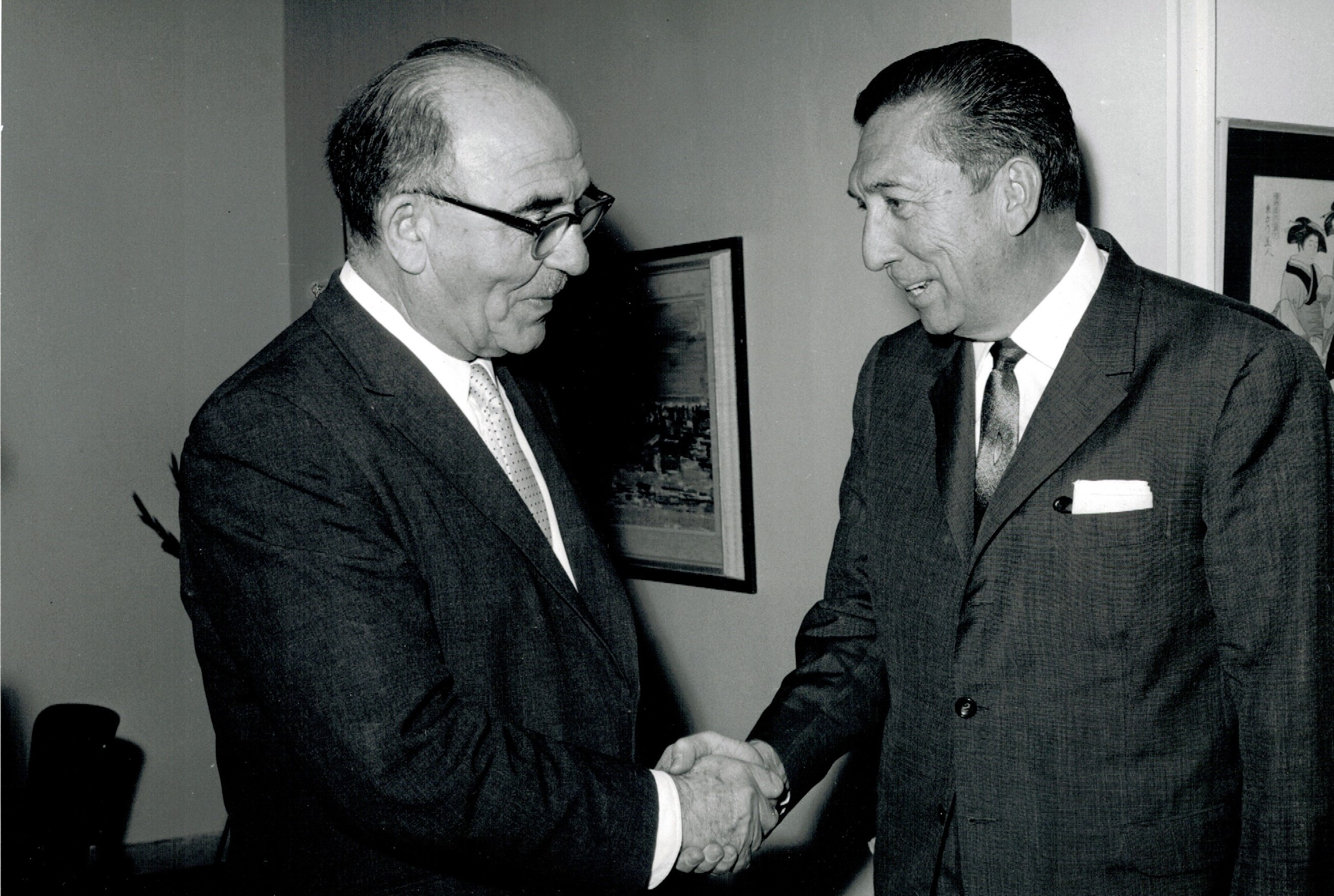
Former president Miguel Alemán Valdés meeting with Prime Minister Levi Eshkol, 1963.

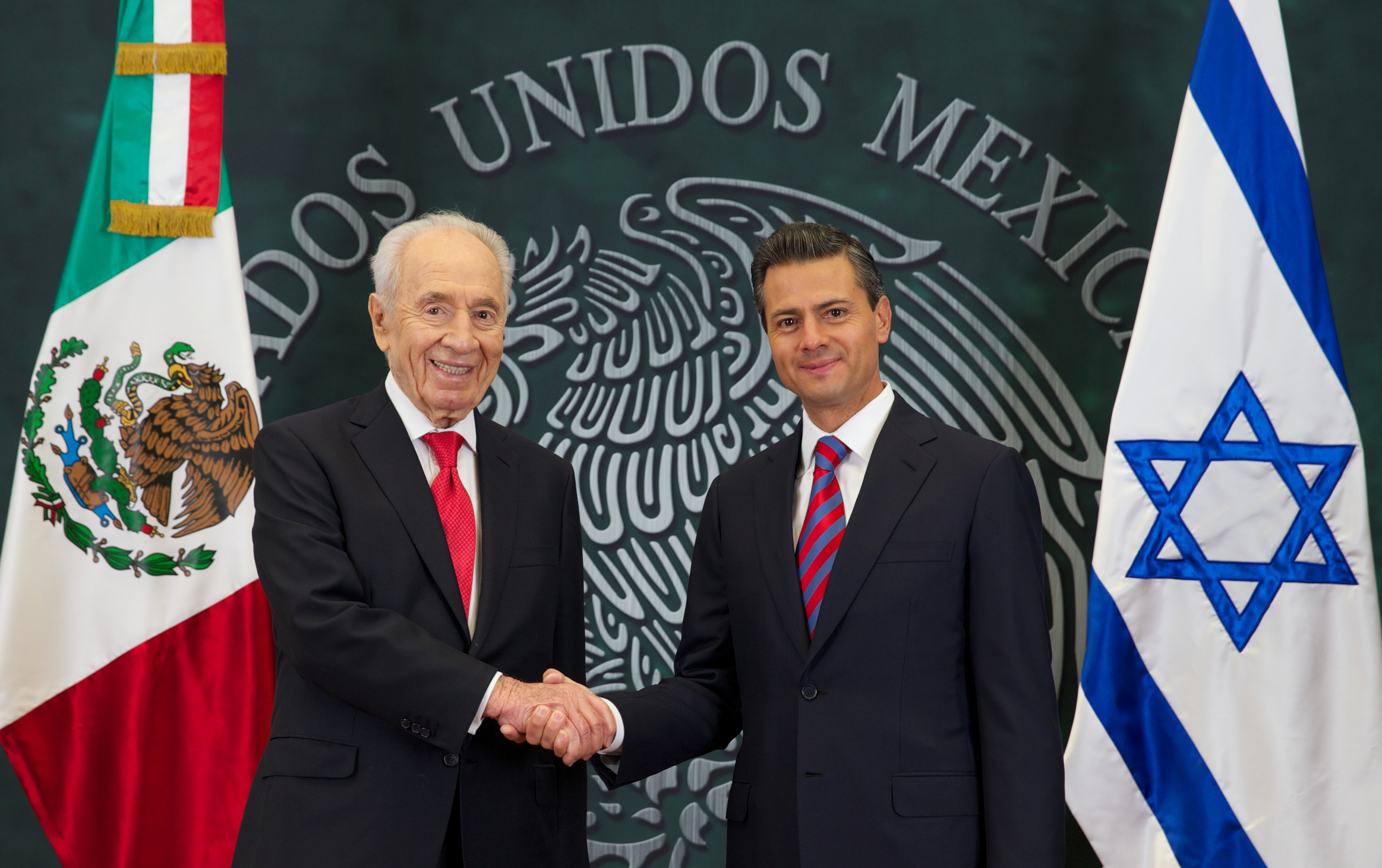
President Shimon Peres and President Enrique Peña Nieto in Mexico City, 2013.

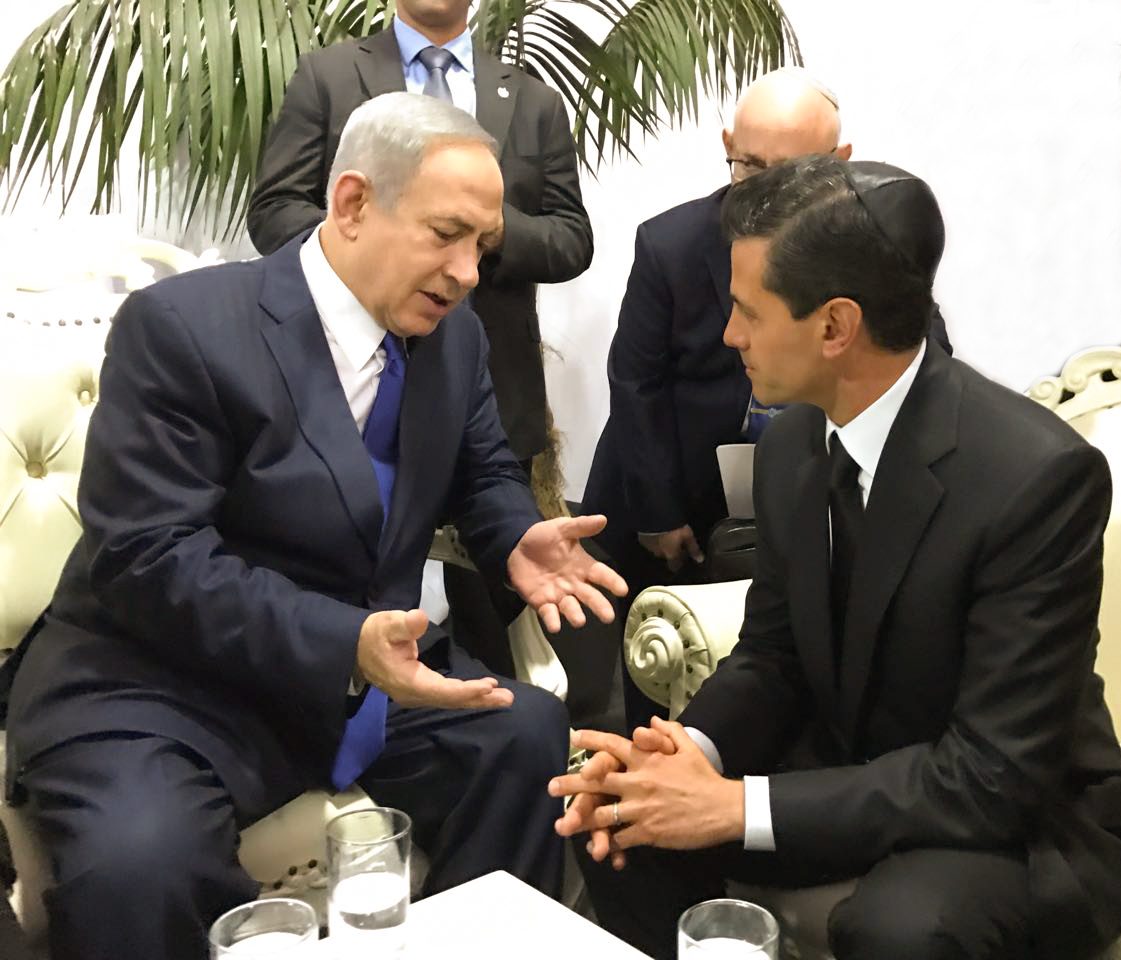
Prime Minister Benjamin Netanyahu meeting with Mexican president Enrique Peña Nieto in Jerusalem; 2016.

== Bilateral agreements ==
Both nations have signed several bilateral agreements, such as an Agreement on Cultural Exchanges (1959); Agreement for Technical Cooperation (1966); Agreement on Customs Cooperation (1996); Agreement on Cooperation in the Fight against Illicit Trafficking and Abuse of Narcotic Drugs and Psychotropic Substances and other Serious Crimes (1997); Agreement on Mutual Assistance in Customs Matters (1998); Agreement to Avoid Double Taxation and Prevent Tax Evasion in the Matter of Taxes on Income and Wealth (1999); Agreement of Collaboration between ProMéxico and the Israeli Institute for Export and International Cooperation (2013); Agreement of Cooperation in the Field of Water Technologies and Water Resources Management (2013); Agreement of Assistance and Technical Cooperation for the Formulation of Strategies of Protection of the Quality of the Groundwater and Actions of Remediation of Aquifers, Protection and Restoration of the Quality of the Water Resources between the Mexican National Water Commission (Conagua) and the Israeli Company of Water (Mekorot) (2013); Memorandum of Understanding for Cooperation in Export Credits between the National Foreign Trade Bank, National Credit Society (Bancomext) and Ashr’a, Israel Foreign Trade Risk Insurance Corporation (2013); Agreement on Bilateral Cooperation in Research and Development in the Private Industrial Sector between the National Council of Science and Technology (CONACyT) and the Israeli Industrial Center for Research and Development (2014); and an Agreement on international cooperation for development, air services, and exploration and use of outer space for peaceful purposes (2017).

== Trade ==
On 6 March 2000, both nations signed a free trade agreement. In 2023, two-way trade between both nations amounted to US$1.2 billion. Israel's main exports to Mexico include: electronic and integrated circuits, batteries, machinery parts, chemical based products, medical instruments, prefabricated buildings, diamond and fruits. Mexico's main exports to Israel include: data processing machines, telephones and mobile phones, motor cars and other vehicles, iron and steel, chemical based products, fruits and other food based products. Mexican multinational companies such as Altos Hornos de México, Grupo Bimbo, Cemex, Orbia and Rassini (among others) operate in Israel.

== Resident diplomatic missions ==
- Israel has an embassy in Mexico City.
- Mexico has an embassy in Tel Aviv.
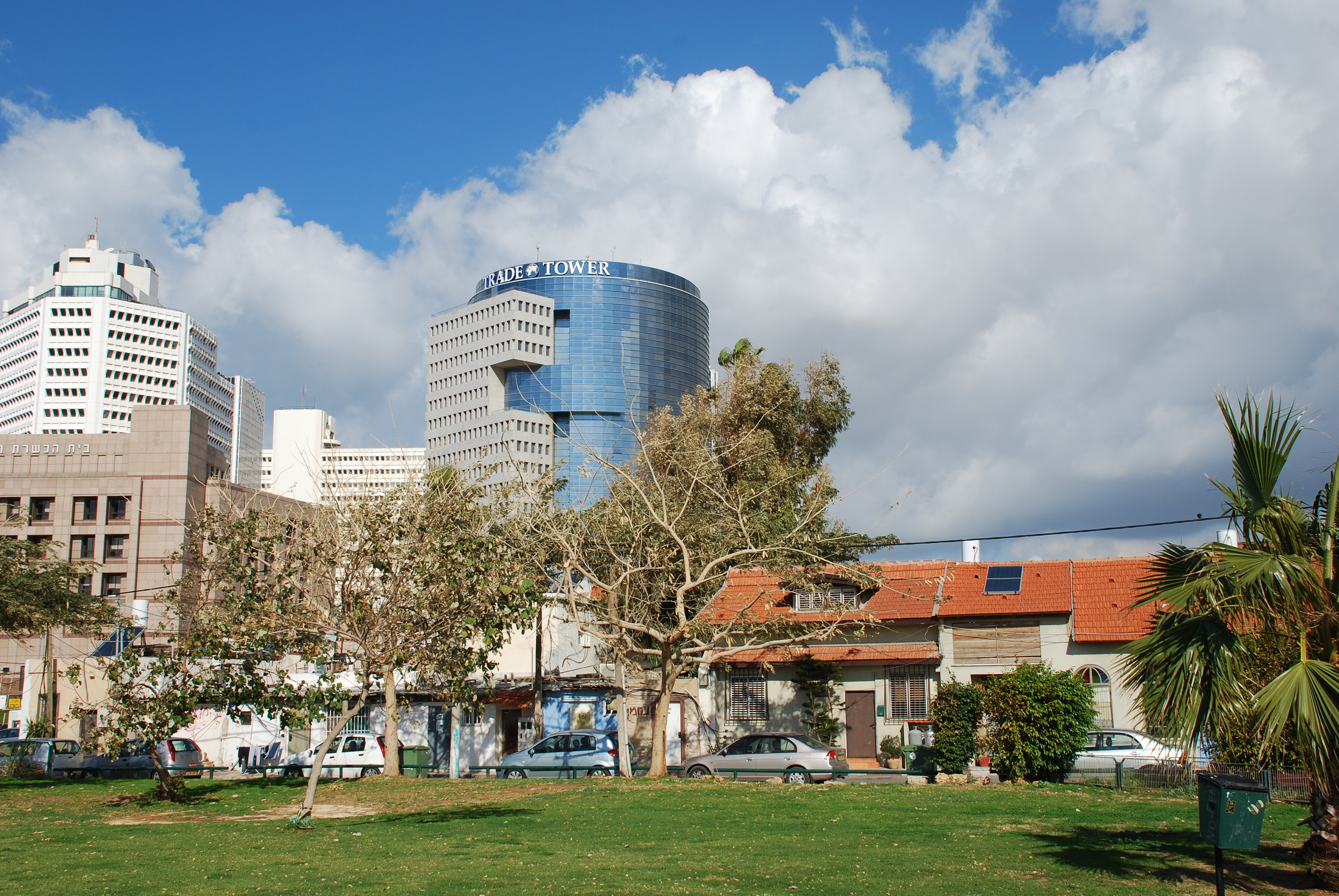
Trade Tower hosting the Embassy of Mexico in Tel Aviv

== Gallery ==
Flags of Israel and Mexico flying in Tel-Aviv

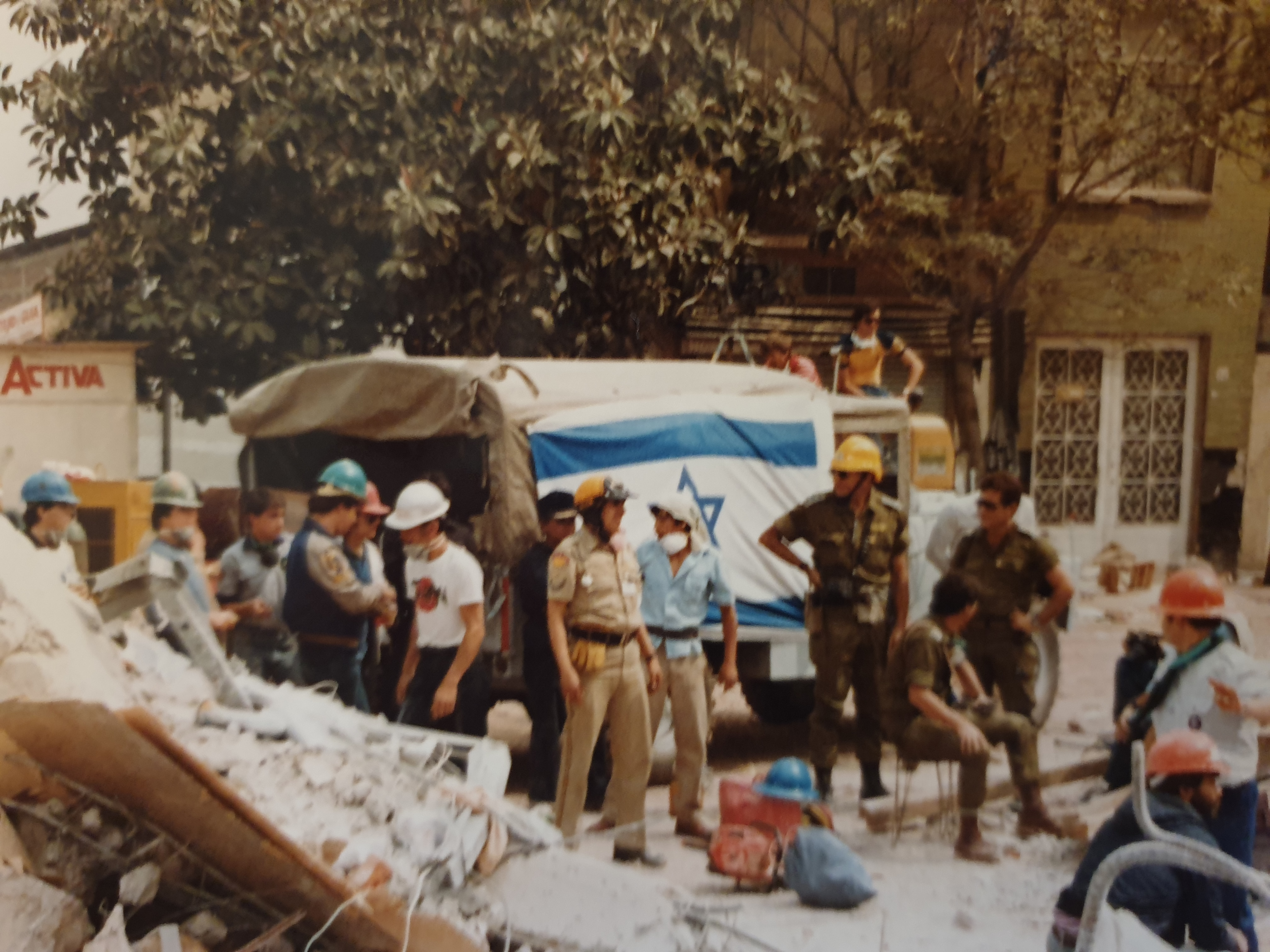
Israeli rescue workers during the 1985 Mexico City earthquake

Israeli rescue workers during the 2017 Puebla earthquake

"Mexico Park" in the Ben Shemen Forest in Israel

Flags of Mexico and Israel at the National Palace in Mexico City

"Mexico Building" at Tel Aviv University

== See also ==
- International recognition of Israel
- Judaism in Mexico
