= Guatemala–Mexico relations =

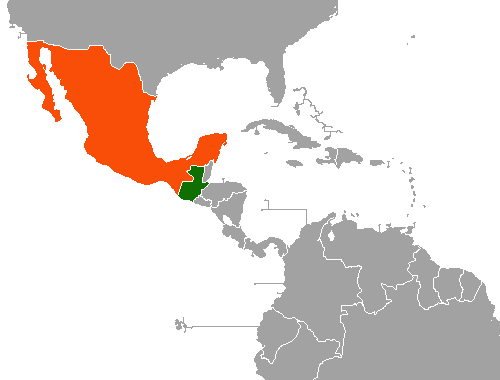

- Guatemala: Mexico

Guatemala and Mexico are neighboring nations that established diplomatic relations in 1848. In January 1959 both nations broke diplomatic relations as a result of the Mexico–Guatemala conflict, however, diplomatic relations were re-established eight months later, in September. Since then, diplomatic relations have continued unabated. Diplomatic relations between both nations are based on geographic proximity, trade, cultural similarities, and a shared history.

Both nations are members of the Association of Caribbean States, Community of Latin American and Caribbean States, Organization of American States, Organization of Ibero-American States, and the United Nations.

== History ==
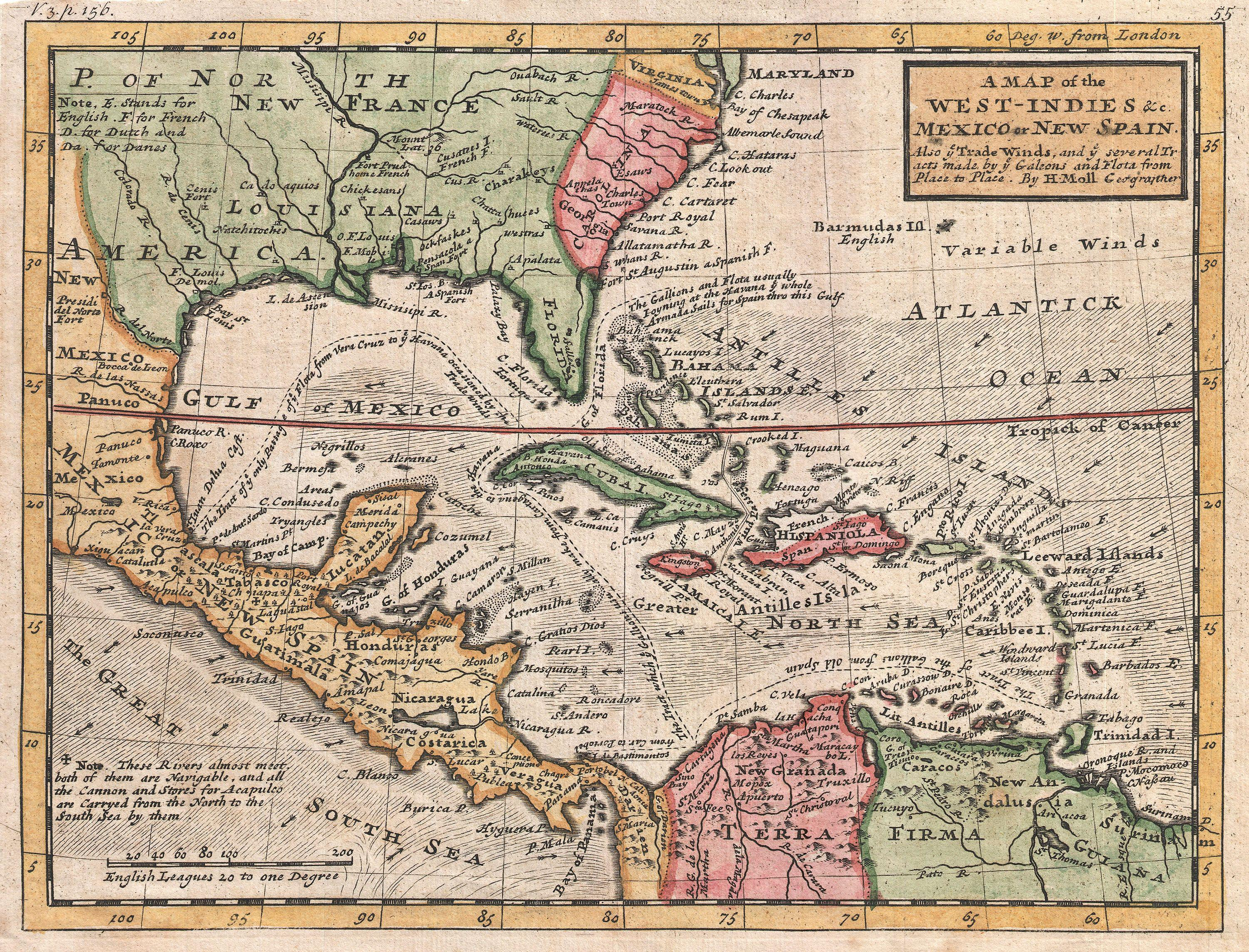
Map from 1732 showing both Guatemala and Mexico as part of what's used to be known as New Spain.

Guatemala and Mexico are two neighboring countries who share a common cultural history from the Maya civilization and both nations were colonized by the Spanish Empire. In 1821, Mexico gained independence from Spain and administered Guatemala (and most of Central America) during the First Mexican Empire. In 1823, the empire collapsed and Guatemala joined the United Provinces of Central America, however, the Guatemalan region of Chiapas chose to separate from Guatemala and joined Mexico as a state. In 1838 the union dissolved and Guatemala became an independent nation. Both nations established diplomatic relations in September 1848 and diplomatic missions were soon opened. In 1926, both nations' resident diplomatic missions were elevated to embassies.

In 1954, Guatemalan President Jacobo Árbenz, a reformist, was ousted in an American-backed coup d'état and replaced by a military junta because of his disputes and opposition against the United Fruit Company in an incident that is known as the 1954 Guatemalan coup d'état. After resigning from the presidency, Árbenz, his family, and several other political allies were allowed to seek asylum in the Mexican Embassy. After several weeks in the embassy, they were allowed to leave the country for Mexico, where he died in 1971.

In December 1958, both nations were very close to declaring war on each other after an incident involving the Guatemalan navy firing upon Mexican fishing boats off the coast of Guatemala and killing three fisherman and wounding 14 others. Soon after the attack diplomatic relations were severed and troops were mobilized to the border on both sides and Mexican fighter planes entered Guatemalan airspace to attack the country's main international airport, however, just before the attack was to take place, newly elected Mexican President Adolfo López Mateos called off the attack. In September 1959, with the mediation of Brazil and Chile; diplomatic relations between Guatemala and Mexico were re-established. This incident was known as the Mexico–Guatemala conflict.

From 1960 to 1996, Guatemala became engaged in a civil war. During that time period, Mexico became home to more than 45,000 Guatemalan refugees and asylum seekers, most of them of indigenous descent. Mexico was host to the peace talks between Guatemalan government officials and rebels. Since the end of the civil war, relations between both nations have greatly improved, and both nations work together to combat human trafficking, organized crime and narcotics.

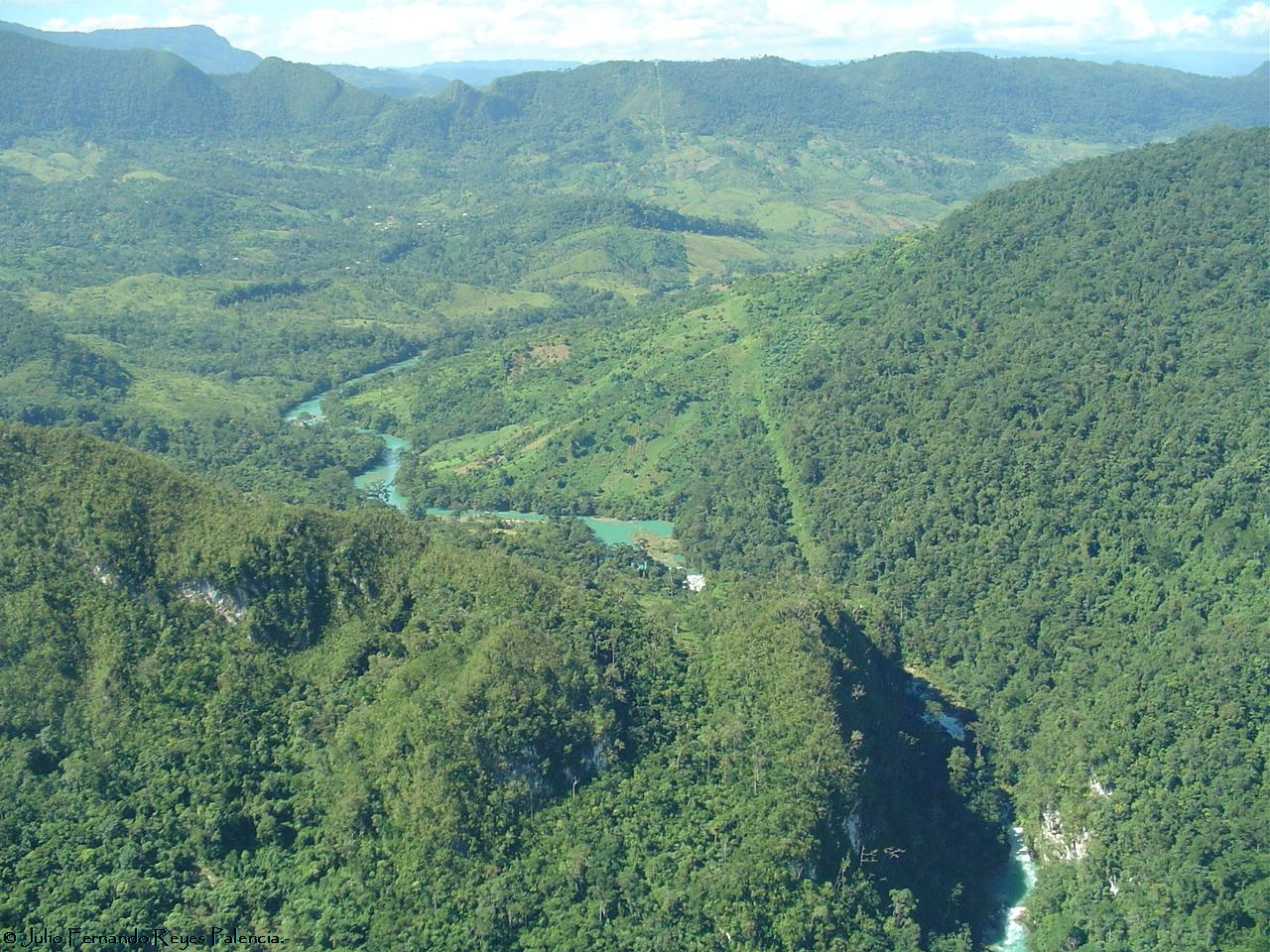
Guatemalan-Mexican border

Each year, thousands of Guatemalan migrants enter Mexico through its unsecured border and mainly transit through the country on their way to the United States. Many leave their country for better opportunities in the United States and Mexico and to escape rampant violence in Guatemala. In 2013, Mexico apprehended and deported over 30,000 Guatemalan nationals to their country. In 2010, there were registered 35,322 legal residents from Guatemala living in Mexico. Also, several thousand Guatemalan citizens cross the border on a daily basis to work in Mexico and return to Guatemala at the end of the day.

In August 2018, Mexican President-elect Andrés Manuel López Obrador met with Guatemalan President Jimmy Morales in Tuxtla Gutiérrez, Chiapas, the first head of government with whom he held a meeting with after winning the elections. President Morales returned to Mexico to attend the inauguration of President López Obrador in Mexico City, on 1 December 2018.

In 2018, several thousand Guatemalans formed part of the Central American migrant caravans and crossed all of Mexico to the northern city of Tijuana to request asylum in the United States. In 2018–2019, Guatemalans requesting asylum in Mexico had increased by 224%. Many are choosing to remain in Mexico, rather than face the uncertainty of trying to request asylum in the US; also, they do not wish to be denied and deported to Guatemala. In 2022, 1,400 Guatemalans requested asylum in Mexico.

In 2020, Guatemalan President Alejandro Giammattei paid a visit to Mexico. In May 2021, Giammattei returned to Mexico on a state visit and, along with President López Obrador, issued an apology to the Mayan communities of their respective nations. In May 2022, Mexican President Andrés Manuel López Obrador paid an official visit to Guatemala, the first stop of his tour to Central America.

In 2023, the Mexican government initiated a program, Sembrando Vida, in which the Mexican Agency for International Development Cooperation (Amexcid) provides US$250 to 4,750 Guatemalan farmers for a maximum period of eight months, as well as agricultural inputs such as seeds, trees and ecological fertilizers made in biofactories, and technical advice with field training. In October 2024, President Arévalo travelled to Mexico to attend the inauguration of President Claudia Sheinbaum. In August 2025, President Sheinbaum travelled to Péten, Guatemala and met with President Arévalo.

== High-level visits ==
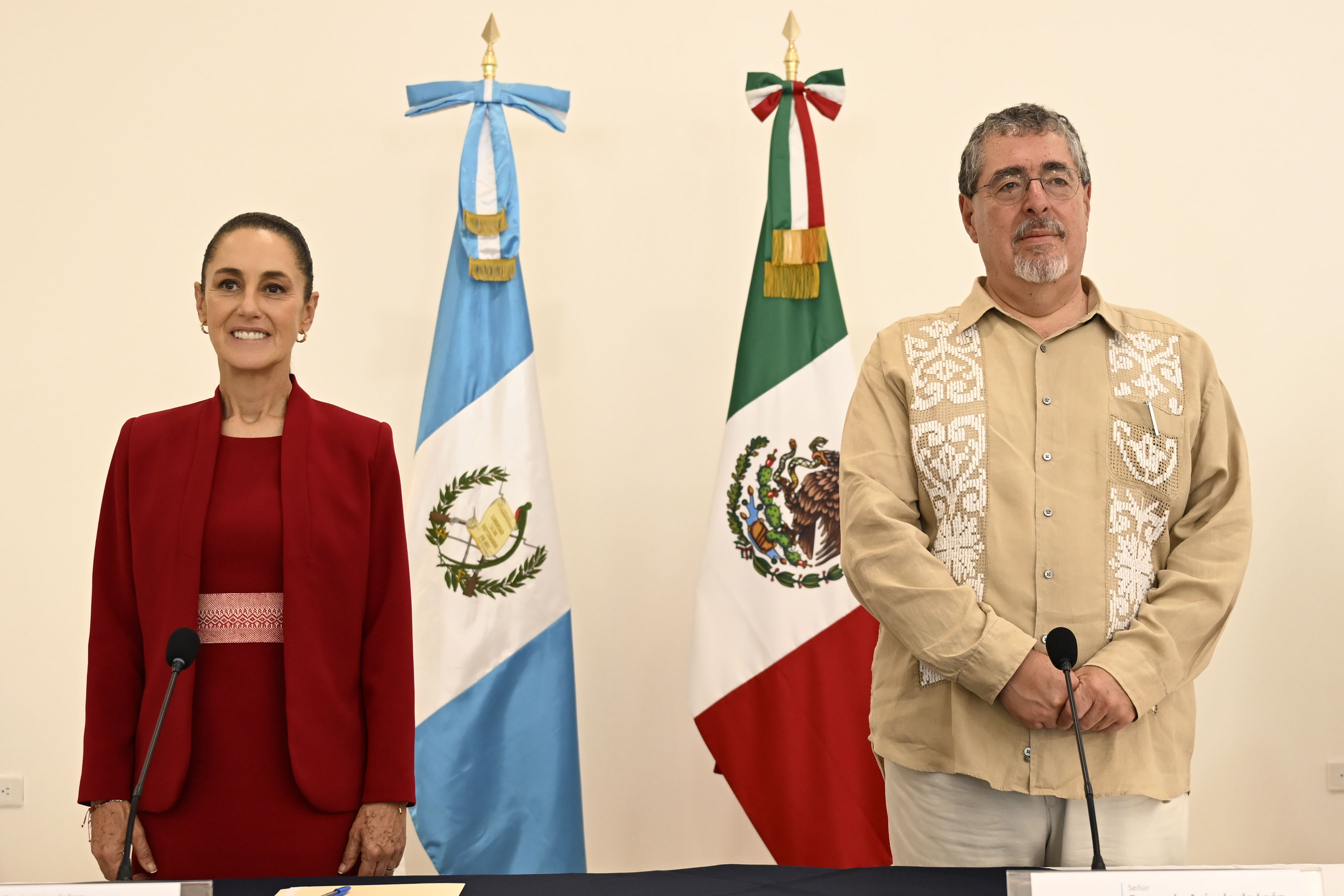
President Claudia Sheinbaum and President Bernardo Arévalo in Flores Island in Guatemala; August 2025.

Presidential visits from Guatemala to Mexico

- President Juan Jose Arévalo (1946)
- President Kjell Eugenio Laugerud García (1976)
- President Óscar Humberto Mejía Victores (1985)
- President Vinicio Cerezo (1986, 1988, 1990)
- President Jorge Serrano Elías (1991, 1993)
- President Álvaro Arzú (1996)
- President Alfonso Portillo (2000, 2002)
- President Óscar Berger (2005, 2006, 2007)
- President Álvaro Colom (2010, 2011)
- President Otto Pérez Molina (2014, 2015)
- President Jimmy Morales (2018)
- President Alejandro Giammattei (2020, March & September 2021)
- President Bernardo Arévalo (May and October 2024, 2025)

Presidential visits from Mexico to Guatemala

- President Gustavo Díaz Ordaz (1966)
- President Luis Echeverría (1975)
- President José López Portillo (1981)
- President Miguel de la Madrid Hurtado (1987)
- President Carlos Salinas de Gortari (1991, 1992)
- President Ernesto Zedillo (1995, 1996, 2000)
- President Vicente Fox (2004, 2006)
- President Felipe Calderón (2008, 2009, 2011, 2012)
- President Enrique Peña Nieto (2013, 2017, 2018)
- President Andrés Manuel López Obrador (2022)
- President Claudia Sheinbaum (2025)
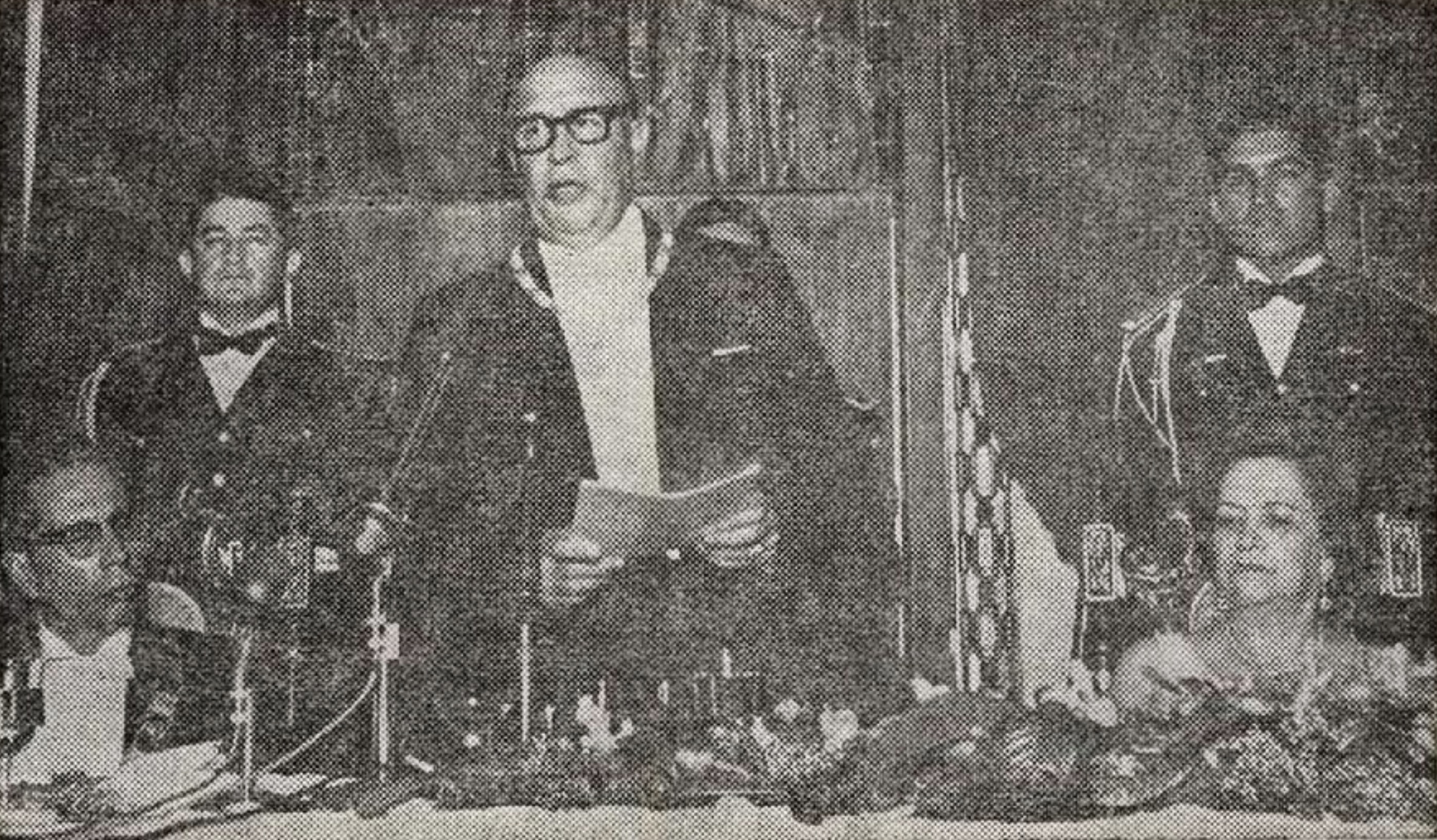
President Enrique Peralta Azurdia and President Gustavo Díaz Ordaz in Guatemala City; 1966.

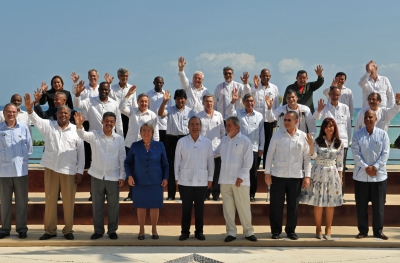
President Felipe Calderón and President Álvaro Colom in Cancún; 2010.

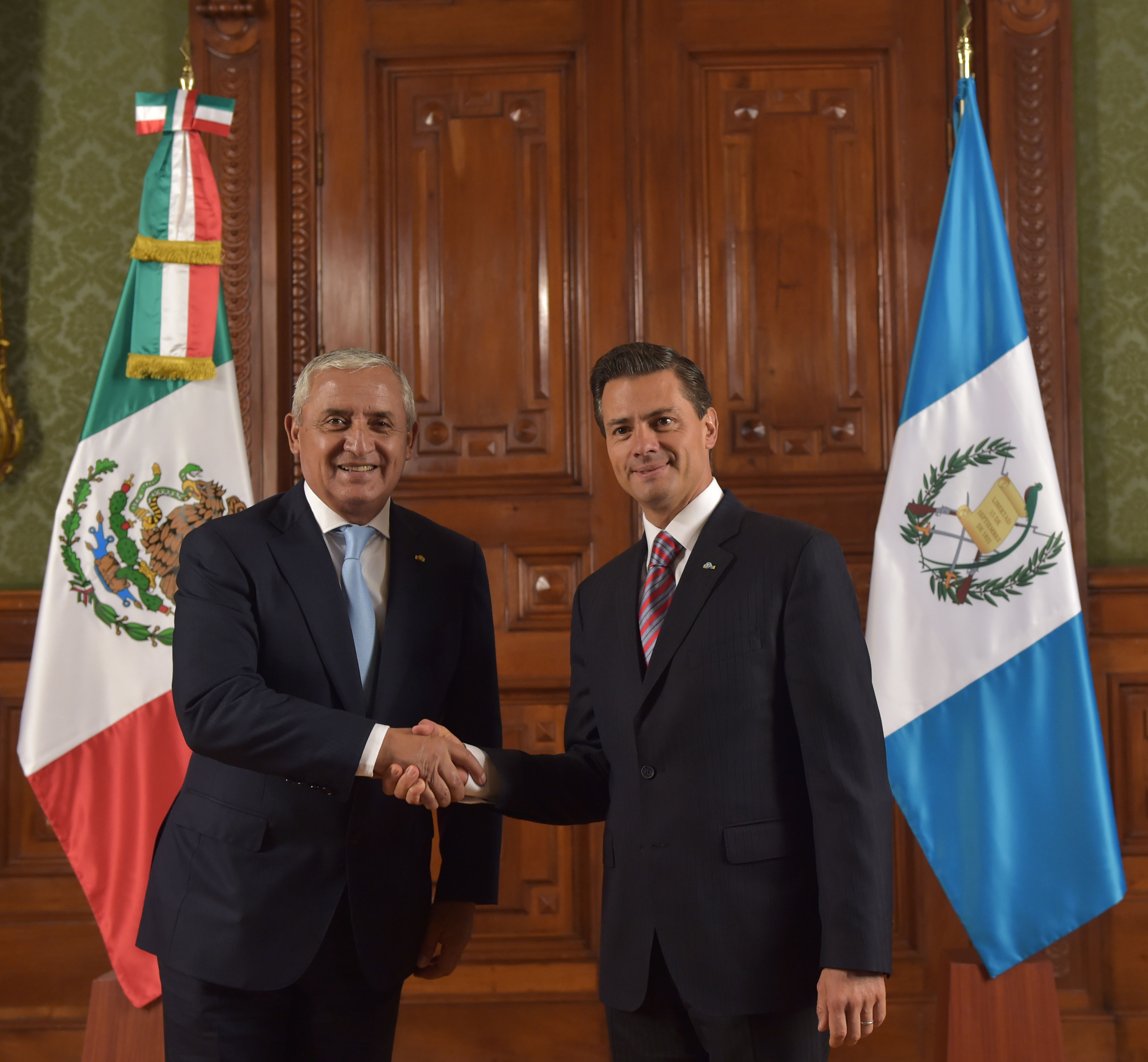
President Otto Pérez Molina and President Enrique Peña Nieto in Mexico City; 2015.

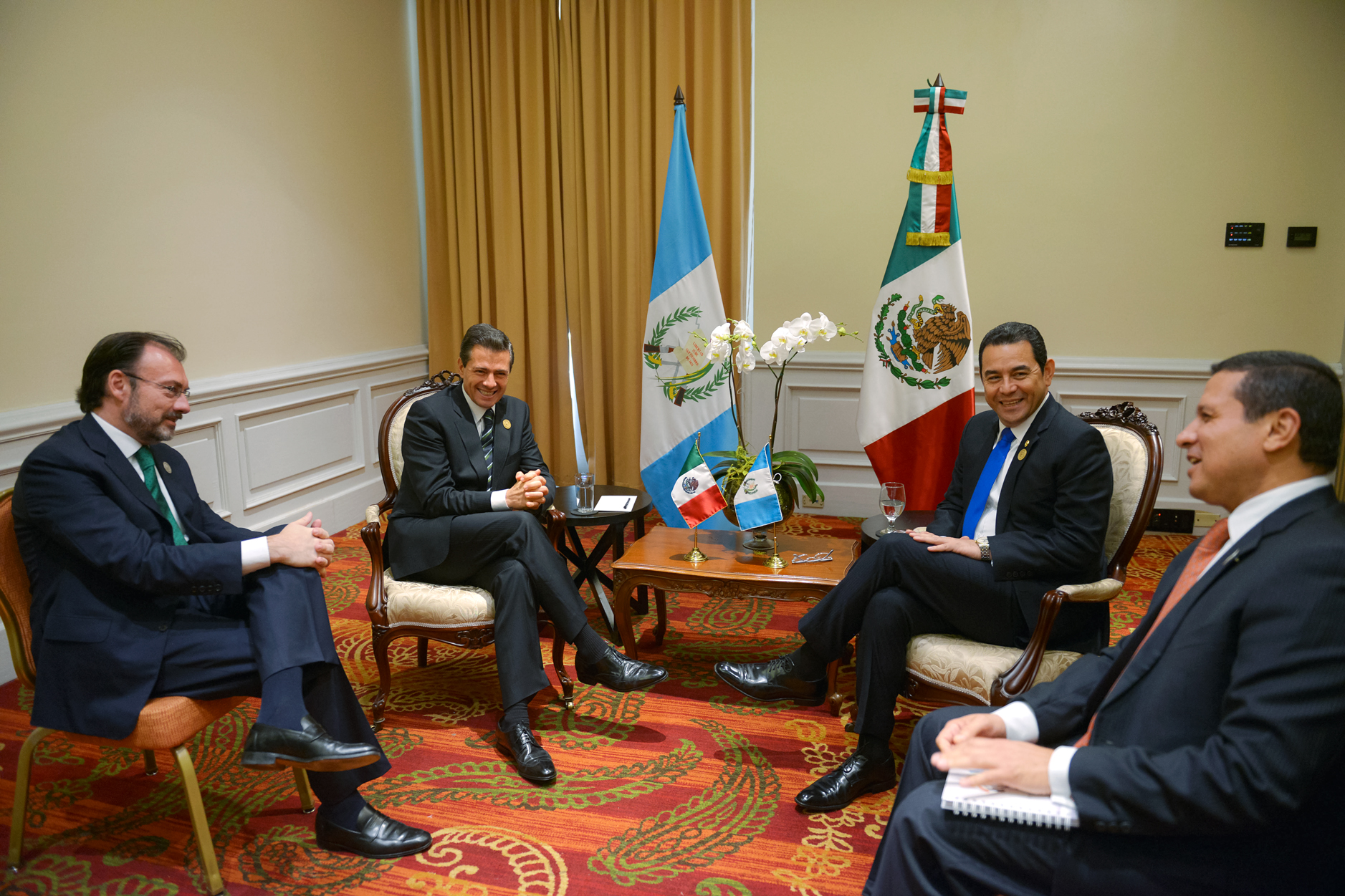
President Enrique Peña Nieto and President Jimmy Morales in Guatemala City; 2017.

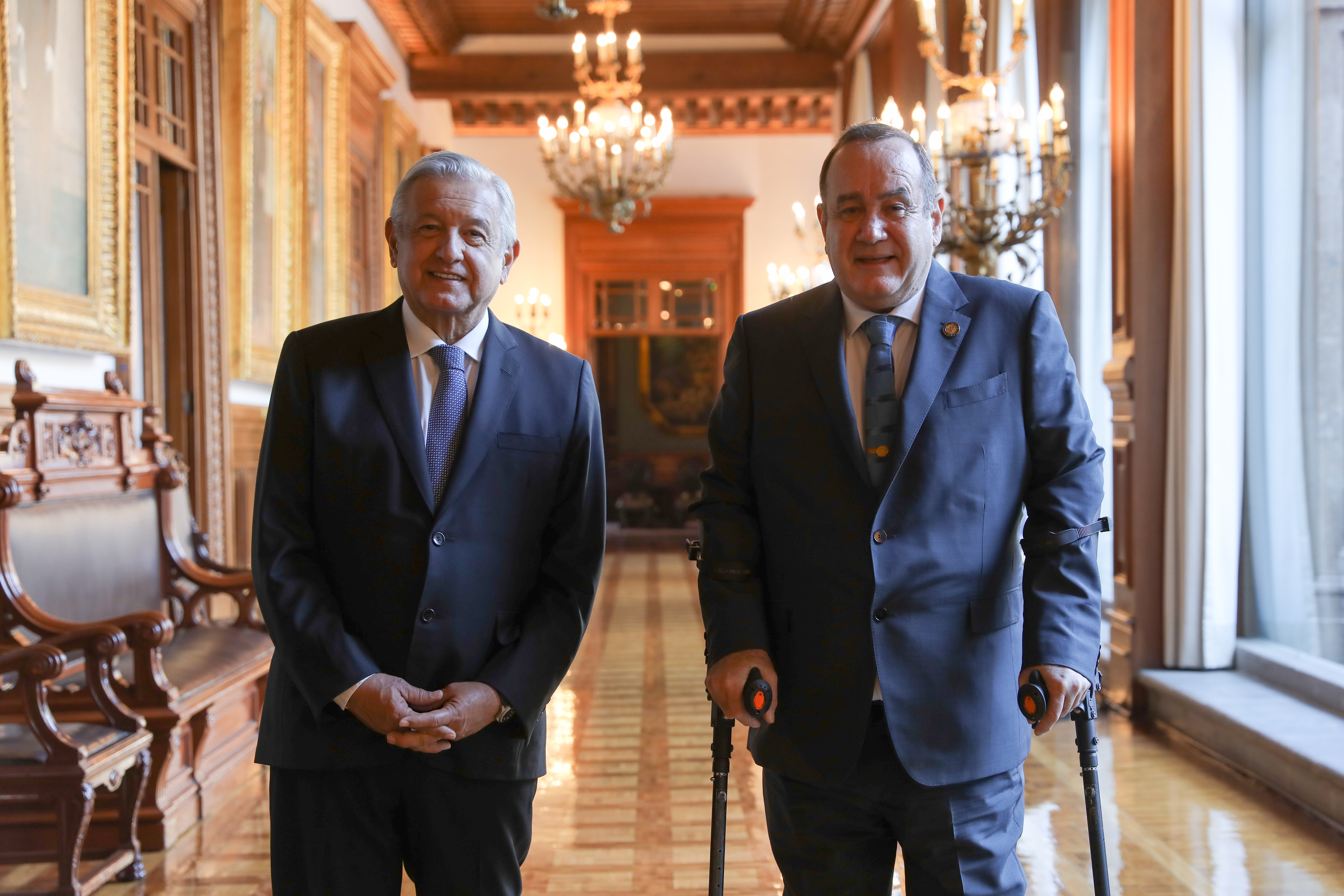
President Andrés Manuel López Obrador and President Alejandro Giammattei in Mexico City, 2021.

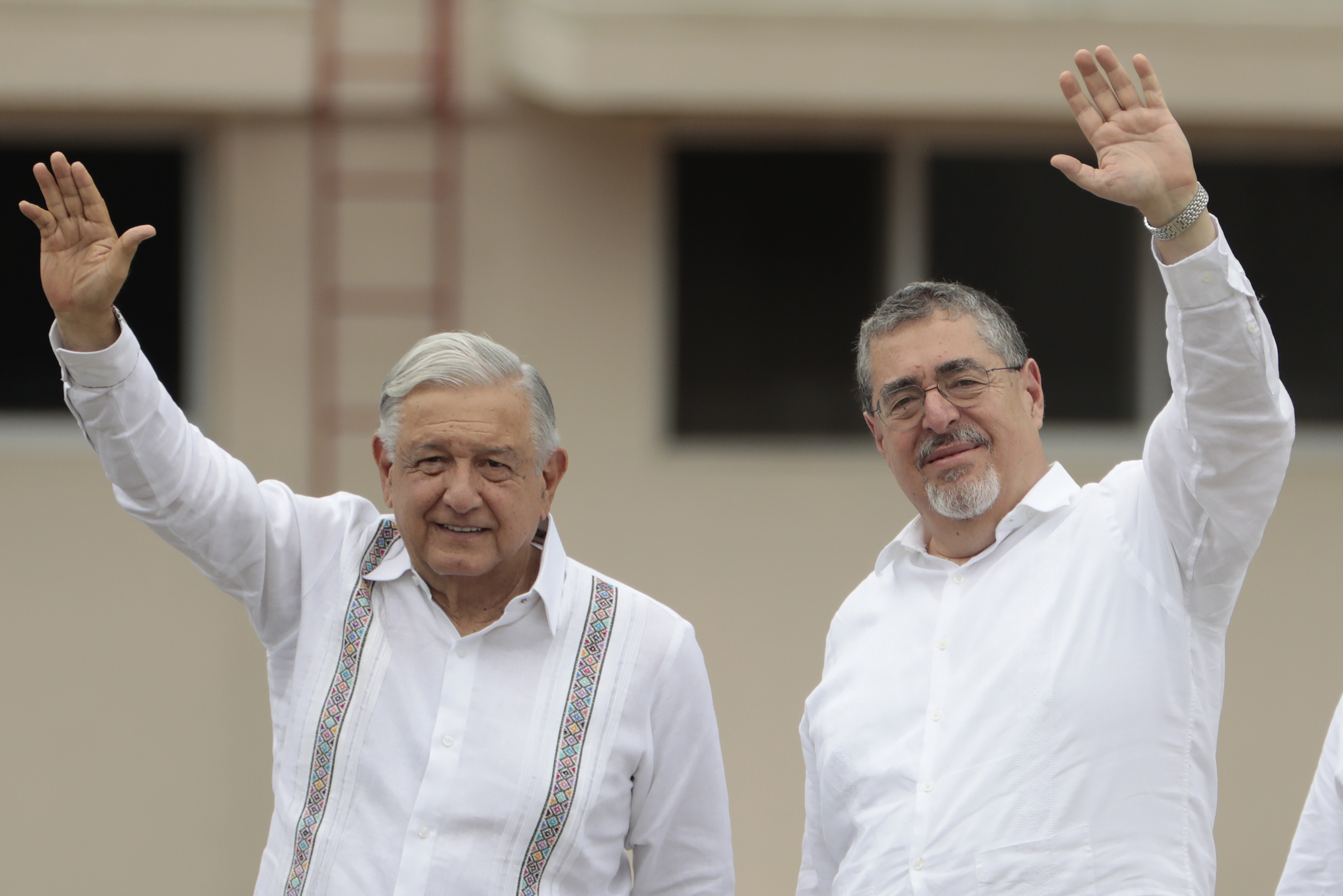
President Andrés Manuel López Obrador and President Bernardo Arévalo, May 2024.

== Bilateral agreements ==
Both nations have signed several bilateral agreements such as a Treaty on Border limits (1882); Agreement on Telecommunications (1963); Agreement for the Protection and Restitution of Archaeological, Artistic and Historical Monuments between both nations (1975); Agreement on Touristic Cooperation (1987); Agreement on Cooperation for the Prevention and Attention in Cases of Natural Disasters (1987); Agreement on the Protection and Improvement of the Environment in the Border Zone (1987); Agreement on Air Transportation (1992); Treaty on Enforcement of Criminal Sentences (1996); Treaty of Cooperation on Mutual Legal Assistance (1996); Treaty for the Recovery and Return of Stolen Vehicles and Aircraft or Matter of Illicit Disposal (1997); Extradition Treaty (1997); Agreement on Scientific and Technical Cooperation (1998); Treaty of Mutual Cooperation for the Exchange of Information regarding Financial Transactions carried out through Financial Institutions to Prevent, Detect and Combat Operations of Illegal Origin or Money Laundering (2002); Agreement to Establish a Mexico-Guatemala Border Health Commission (2003); Agreement on the Mutual Recognition of Certificates of Studies, Degrees and Academic Degrees at the Primary, Secondary and Upper Secondary Level or their Equivalents (2009); Agreement on Educational, Cultural and Sports Cooperation (2011) and an Agreement on Cooperation to Combat the Illicit Traffic in Narcotic Drugs, Psychotropic Substances, Chemical Precursors, Essential Chemicals and Products or Preparations Containing them, their Related Offenses, as well as the Drug dependency (2015).

== Transportation and border crossing ==
There are direct flight between both nations with Aeroméxico, Aeroméxico Connect, Avianca Guatemala, TAG, Volaris and Volaris El Salvador. There are also several border crossings along the Guatemala–Mexico border.

== Trade relations ==
In June 2000, Guatemala and Mexico (along with El Salvador and Honduras) signed a free trade agreement which took effect in 2001. Since then, both Costa Rica and Nicaragua have joined the joint free trade agreement. In 2023, trade between Guatemala and Mexico totaled US$2.8 billion. Guatemala's main exports to Mexico include: sugar cane, palm oil, clothing articles, natural rubber, seeds, seafood, and chemical based products. Mexico's main exports to Guatemala include: electrical wires and cables, steel based products, motor vehicles, chemical based products, and fruits. Mexican multinational companies such as América Móvil, Banco Azteca, Cemex, Grupo Bimbo, Gruma and Grupo Elektra (among others) operate in Guatemala.

== Resident diplomatic missions ==
of Guatemala in Mexico

- Mexico City (Embassy and Consulate-General)
- Cancún (Consulate-General)
- Ciudad Juárez (Consulate-General)
- Monterrey (Consulate-General)
- Oaxaca City (Consulate-General)
- San Luis Potosí (Consulate-General)
- Tapachula (Consulate-General)
- Tenosique (Consulate-General)
- Tijuana (Consulate-General)
- Tuxtla Gutiérrez (Consulate-General)
- Arriaga (Consulate)
- Acayucan (Consulate)
- Ciudad Hidalgo (Consulate)
- Comitán (Consulate)

of Mexico in Guatemala

- Guatemala City (Embassy)
- Flores (Consulate)
- Quetzaltenango (Consulate)
- Tecún Umán (Consulate)

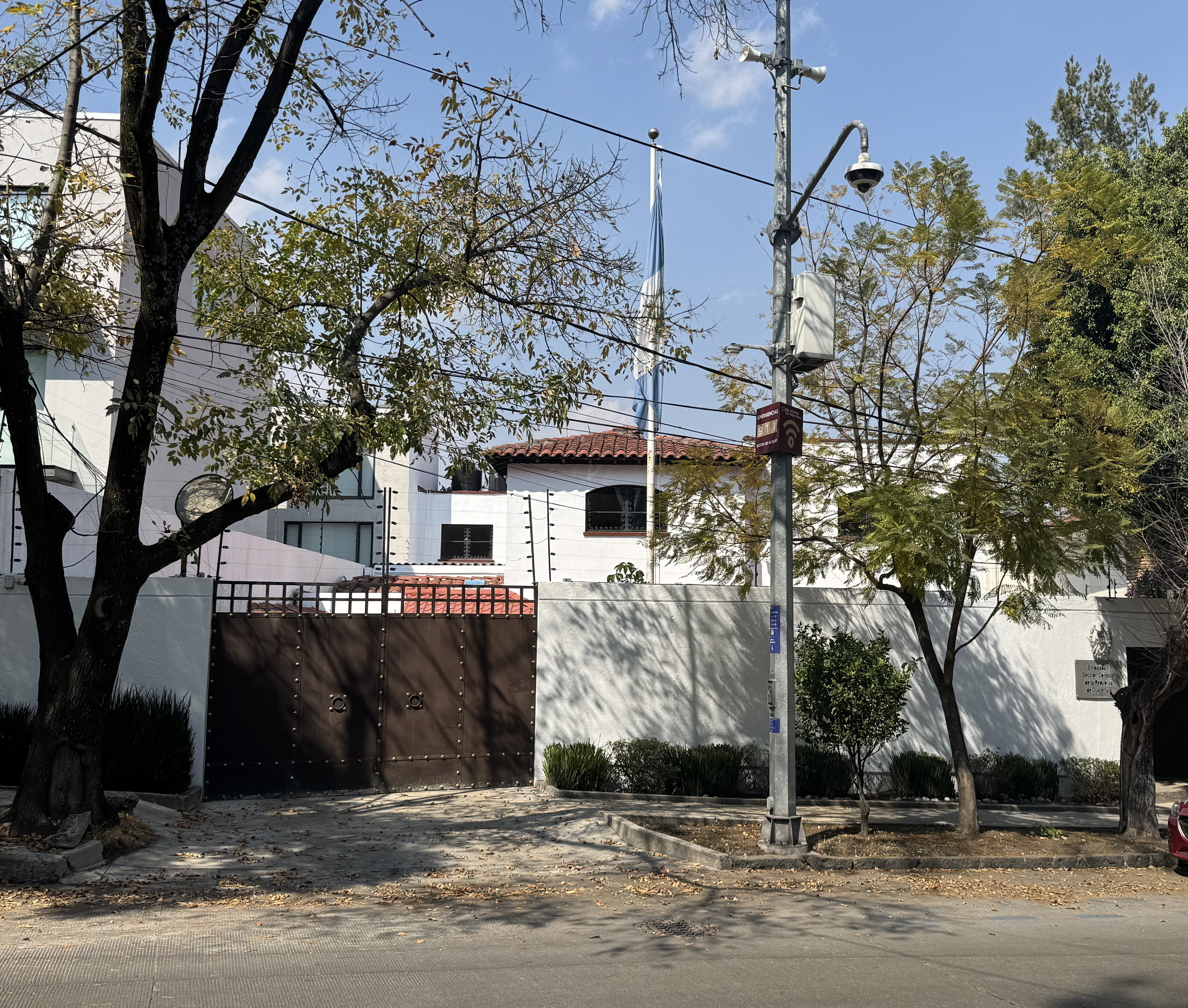
Embassy of Guatemala in Mexico City

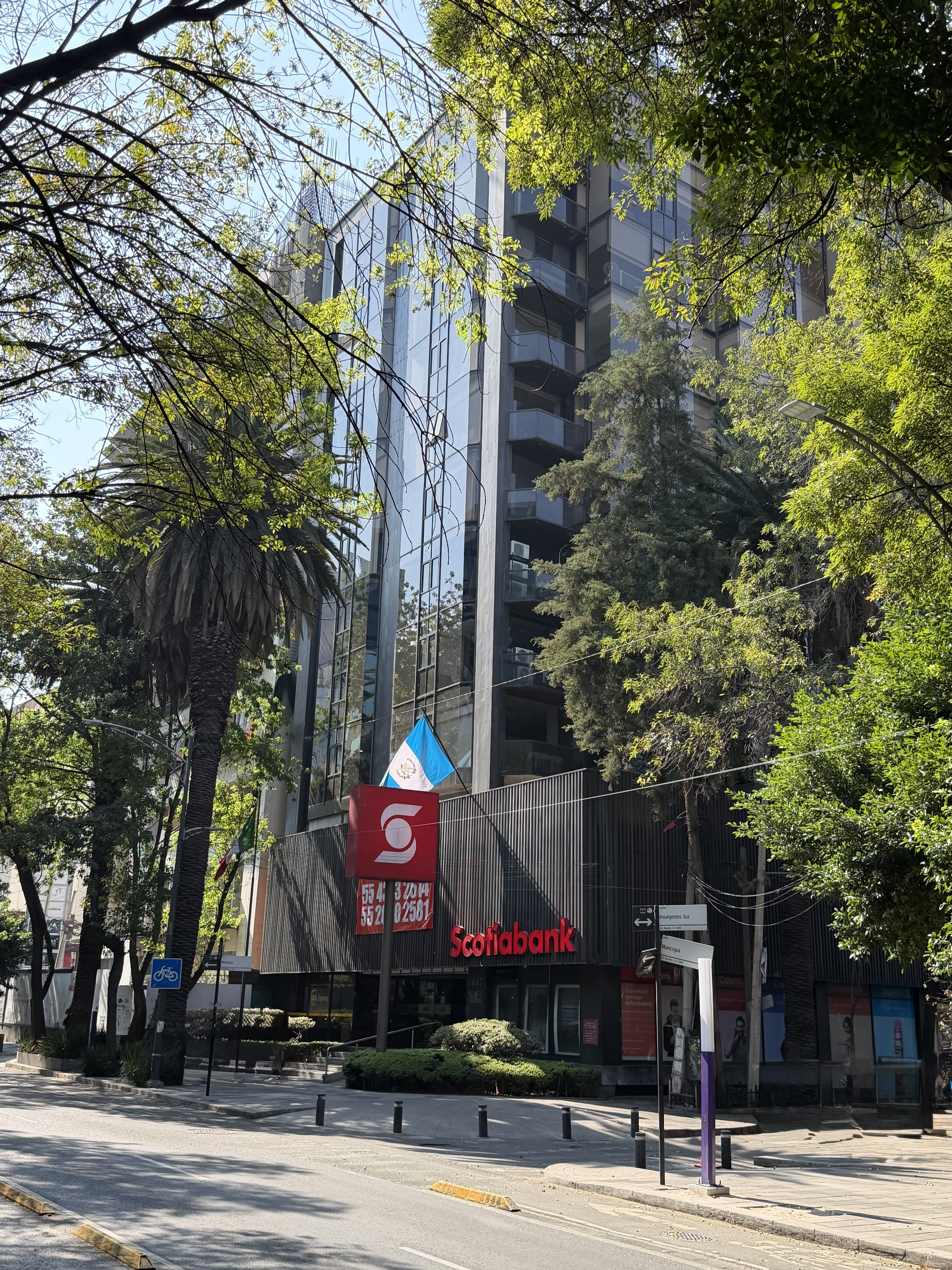
Consulate-General of Guatemala in Mexico City

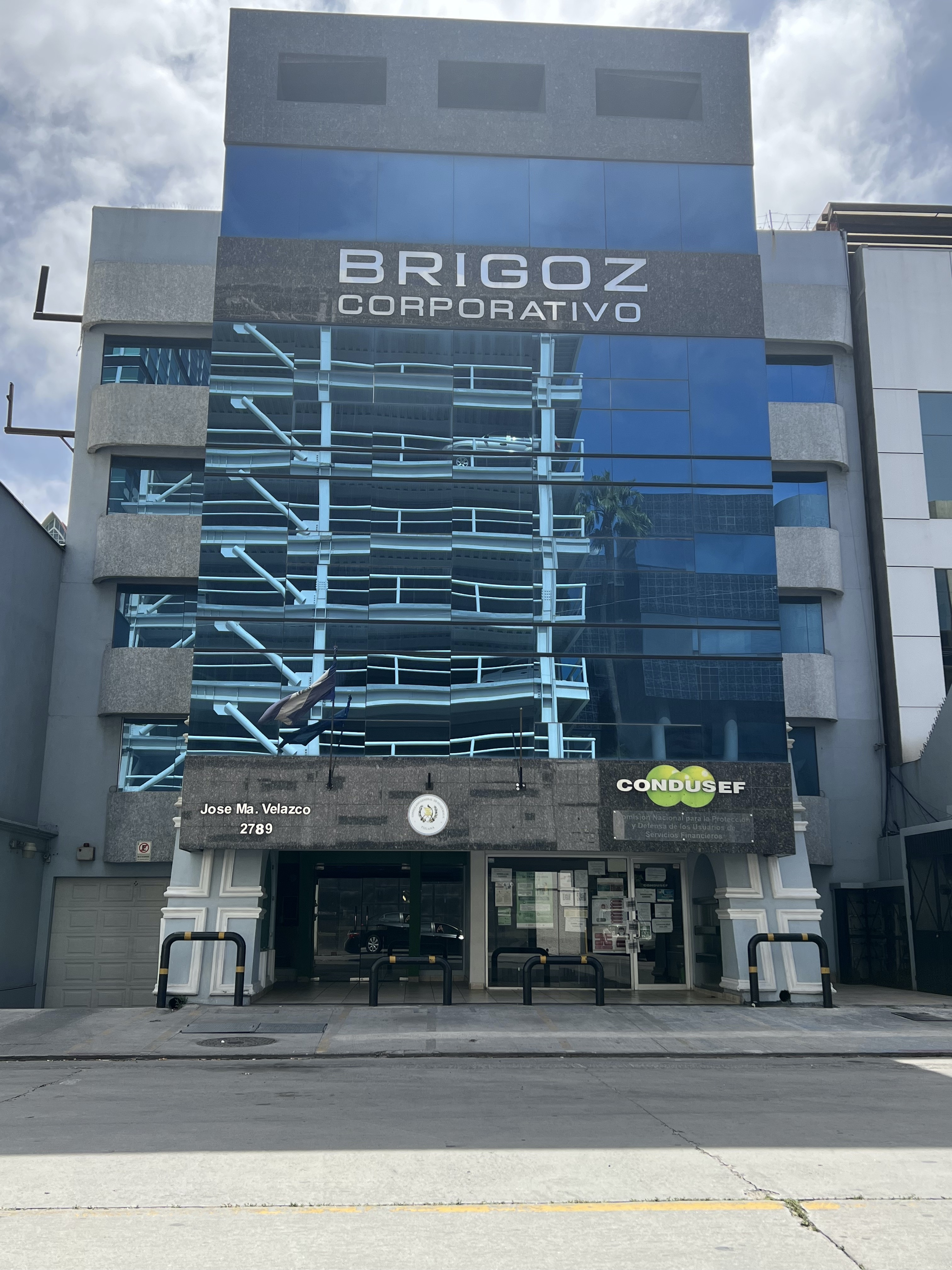
Consulate-General of Guatemala in Tijuana
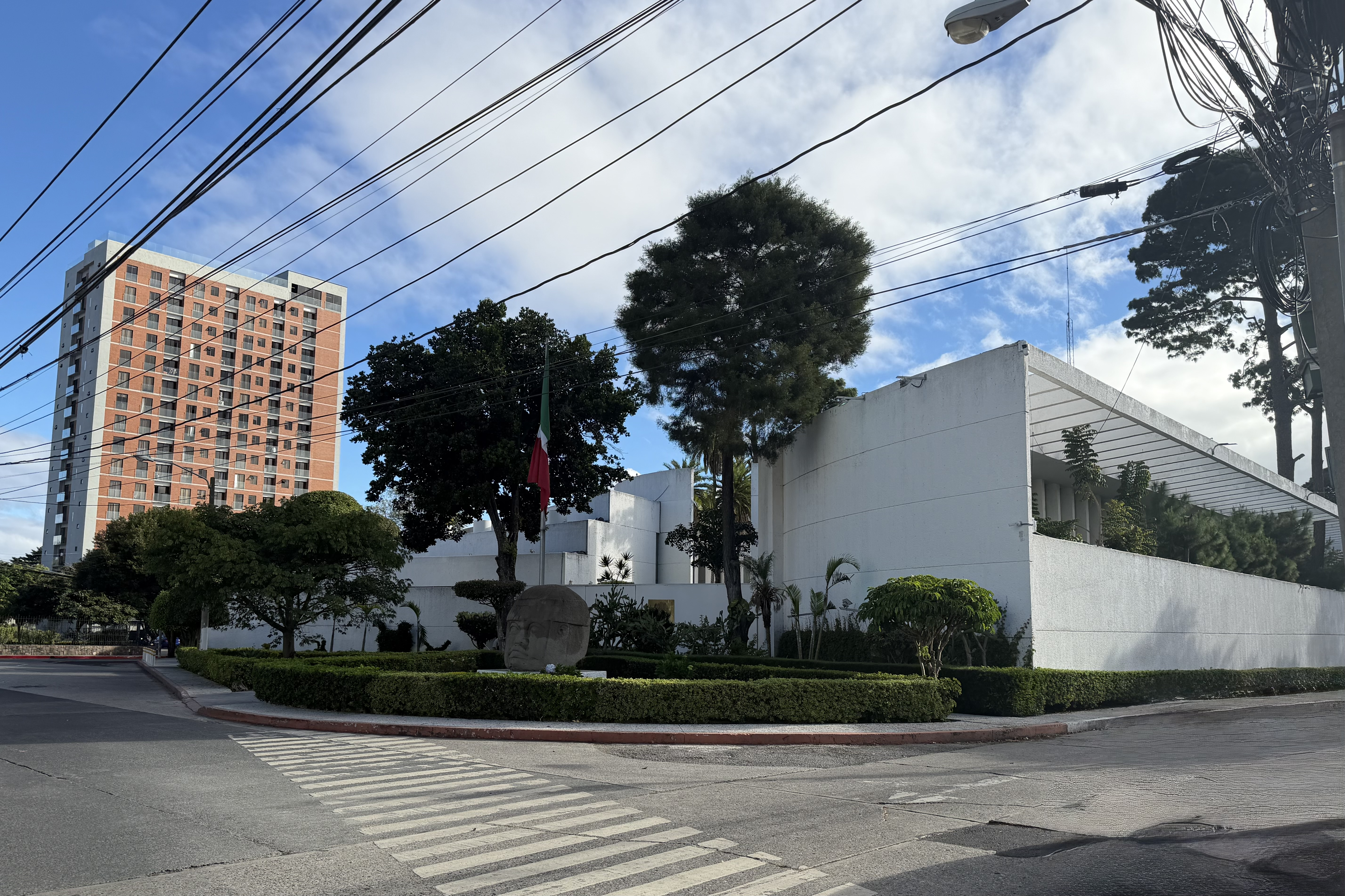
Embassy of Mexico in Guatemala City

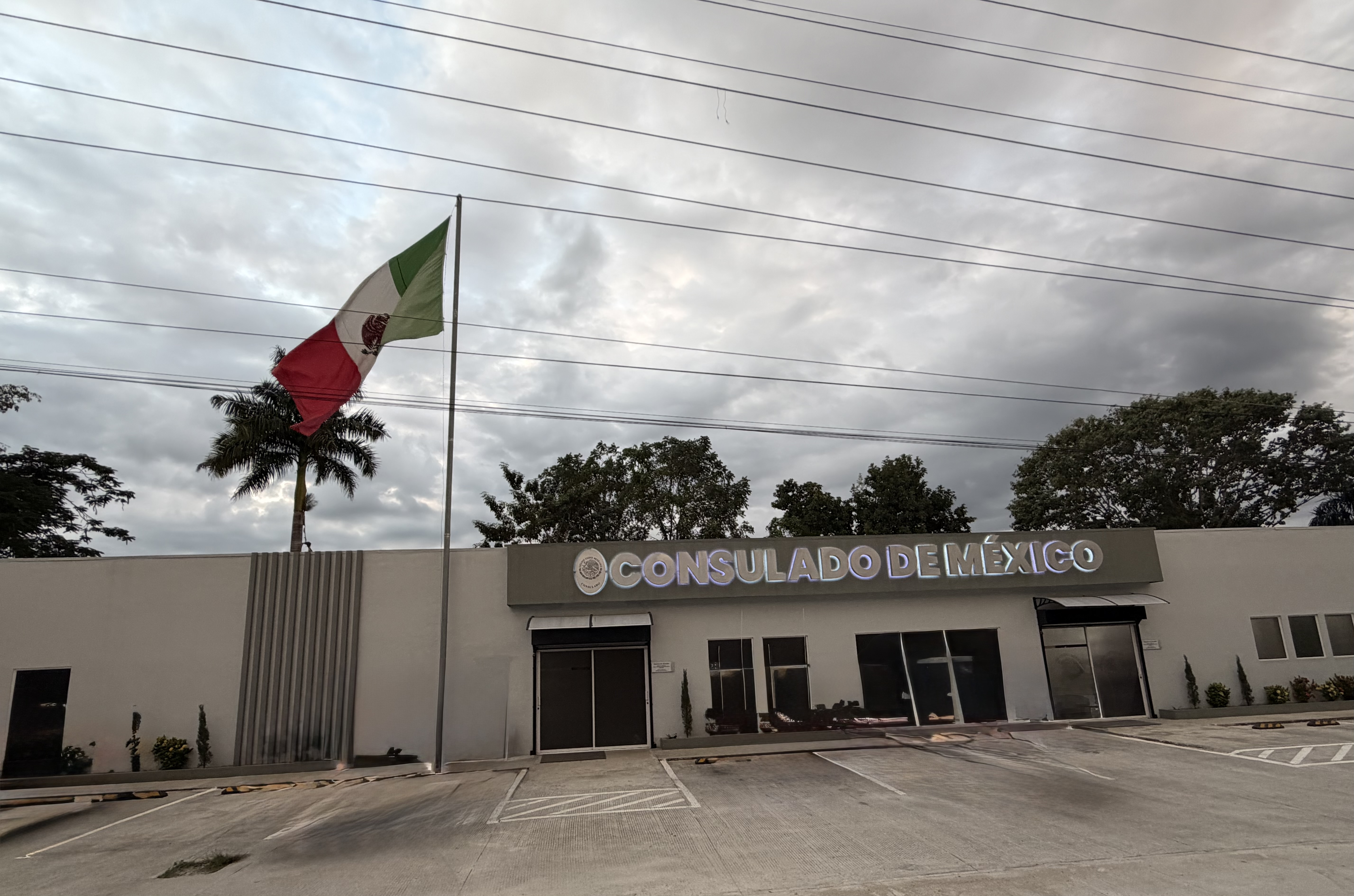
Consulate of Mexico in Flores (Petén)

== Gallery ==
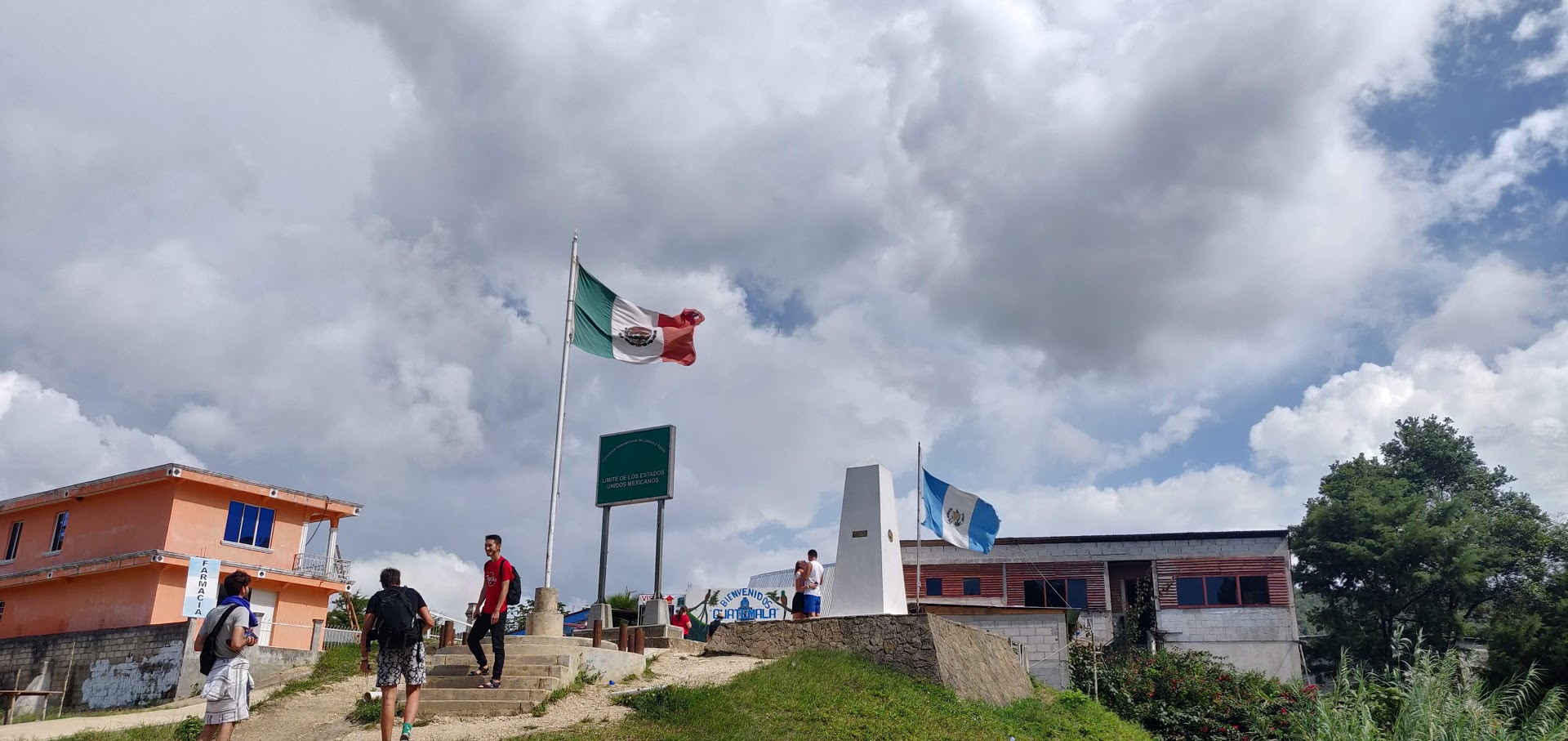
Mexico-Guatemala border from the Mexican side

Honorary Consulate of Mexico in Antigua Guatemala

Mexican President Enrique Peña Nieto with Guatemalan Nobel Peace Prize laureate Rigoberta Menchú at the United Nations in New York City

The Mexican Government donating COVID-19 vaccinations to Guatemala

== See also ==
- Chiapas (incl. Soconusco), a Mexican state that was claimed by Guatemala until 1895
- Guatemalan Mexicans
- Guatemala–Mexico border
- Immigration to Guatemala
- Mexico–Guatemala conflict, 1958-1959
