= Guatemalan Mexicans =

Guatemalan Mexican guatemalo-mexicano
Total population
- 54,508 Guatemala-born residents (2017) Unknown number of Mexicans of Guatemalan descent

Languages
- Mexican Spanish • Guatemalan Spanish • Mayan languages

Religion
- Roman Catholicism • Pentecostalism

Related ethnic groups
- Guatemala diaspora

There is a large Guatemalan diaspora in Mexico. According to the 2010 census, there were 35,322 Guatemalan citizens living in Mexico, up from the 23,957 individuals counted in 2000.

== Migration history ==
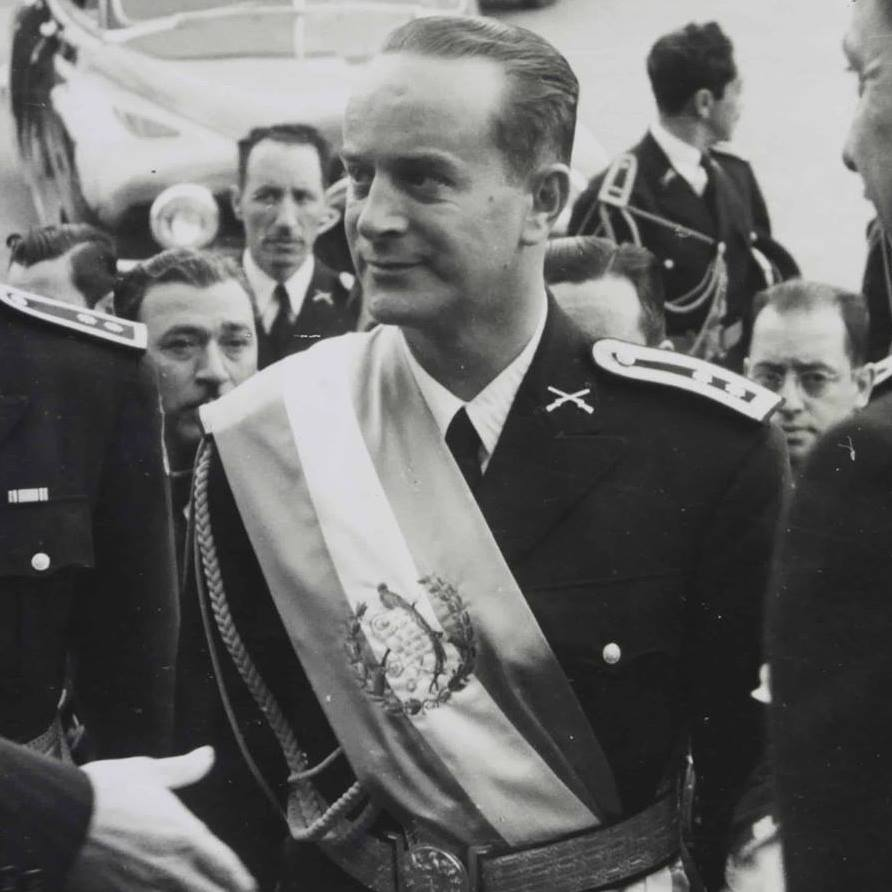
Jacobo Árbenz, 25th President of Guatemala, was exiled following the CIA-backed 1954 coup d'état and died in Mexico City in 1971.

There has been a Guatemalan presence in Mexico since at least 1895, when the National Census counted 14,004 individuals, however this dropped to 5,820 in 1900. Due to the devastating Guatemalan Civil War, many Guatemalans were allowed into Mexico as refugees. Some stayed only temporarily, but others settled down in the country. Recently, many Guatemalans have been immigrating to Mexico rather than the United States. Most settle around the Guatemala-Mexico border to keep in touch with family, but many move to Mexico City where a large community already exists, and some settle around Baja California and US-Mexico border states because of Guatemalan American communities existing in American border cities, some with relatives in the United States. Both countries share the Spanish language; their historical origins are common (part of the Spanish Empire).

== Notable Guatemalan Mexicans ==
- Antonio López
- Carlos Mérida
- Luis Cardoza y Aragón
- Rubio Rubin
- Carlos Solorzano
- Héctor Sandarti
- Arqueles Vela

== See also ==
- Guatemala–Mexico relations
- Illegal immigration to Mexico
