= Argentina–Mexico relations =

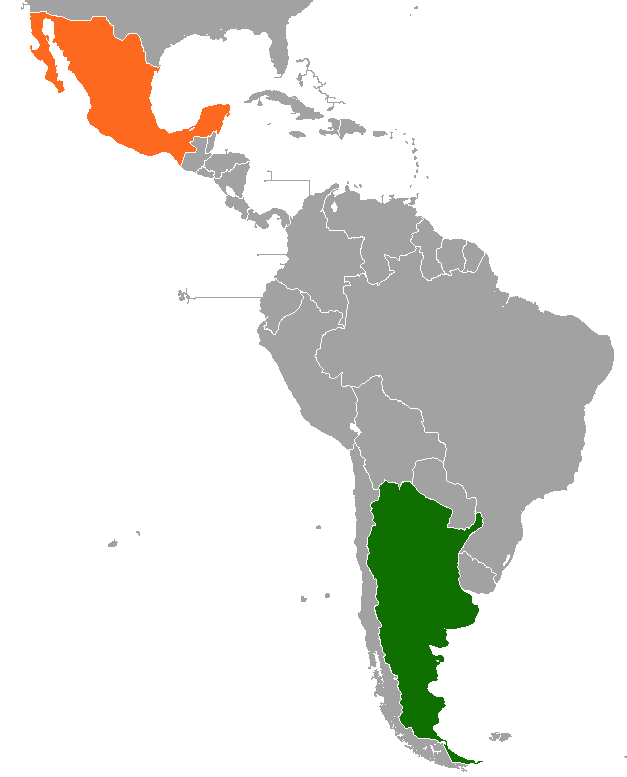

- Argentina: Mexico

The nations of Argentina and Mexico established diplomatic relations in 1888. Both nations are members of the Community of Latin American and Caribbean States, G-20 major economies, Latin American Integration Association, Organization of American States, Organization of Ibero-American States and the United Nations.

== History ==
Both Argentina and Mexico share a common history in the fact that both nations were once part of the Spanish Empire. During the Spanish colonial period, Mexico was then known as Viceroyalty of New Spain and the capital being Mexico City while Argentina was at first governed from the Viceroyalty of Peru in Lima and in 1776, Spain created the Viceroyalty of the Río de la Plata where the capital was established in Buenos Aires. In 1810, both Argentina and Mexico declared their independence from Spain with each nation obtaining independence in 1816 and 1821, respectively.

The first official diplomatic contact between the newly independent nations was in 1824 when Mexican President Guadalupe Victoria sent a letter to the government of Argentina stating "America [continent] has one cause: its unity and independence." In 1880, Argentina sent its first resident consul to Mexico and in 1891, Mexico reciprocated the gesture and sent its first resident consul to Argentina. Diplomatic relations between both nations were established on 20 December 1888.

In May 1914, Mexico and the United States were on the verge of declaring war on each other over the Tampico Affair. At the time Argentina, along with Brazil and Chile belonged to the ABC nations group. In order to prevent war between Mexico and the United States; diplomats from the three South American nations met with officials from Mexico and the United States in Niagara Falls, Canada, to prevent a war between them. The peace conference ended in success and war was adverted.

In 1927, Argentina and Mexico elevated their diplomatic missions to that of embassies. Since then, diplomatic relations between the two nations have continued unabated. In 1960, Mexican President Adolfo López Mateos became the first Mexican head-of-state to pay a state visit to Argentina. In 1985, President Raúl Alfonsín was the first Argentine head-of-state to pay an official visit to Mexico. Since then, there have been several presidential visits between both nations respectfully. During the 1970s, Argentina was ruled by military generals which targeted anybody who did not support them. During the Dirty War, several thousand Argentine citizens fled the country and sought asylum in Mexico. In 1982, Argentina and the United Kingdom declared war on each other for the Falkland Islands (known also as the Malvinas). Mexico remained neutral on Argentina's claims to the islands during the war, however, today it supports Argentina's eventual possession of the islands.

Recently both nations have advocated for increased bilateral trade and closer interaction between Mercosur (which Argentina is a part of) and the Pacific Alliance (which Mexico is a part of). In February 2017, Presidents Enrique Peña Nieto and Mauricio Macri held a telephone conversation, in which President Macri highlighted the closeness and friendship between both nations, and expressed Argentina's support for Mexico against the position adopted by the Government of the United States under President Donald Trump towards Mexico.

In February 2021, Argentine President, Alberto Fernández, paid a visit to Mexico and met with Mexican President, Andrés Manuel López Obrador. While in Mexico, President Fernández visited an AstraZeneca COVID-19 vaccine plant of the town of Ocoyoacac which will provide both nations (and other nations in Latin America) with vaccines. Both nations also celebrated 132 year of diplomatic relations.

== High-level visits ==
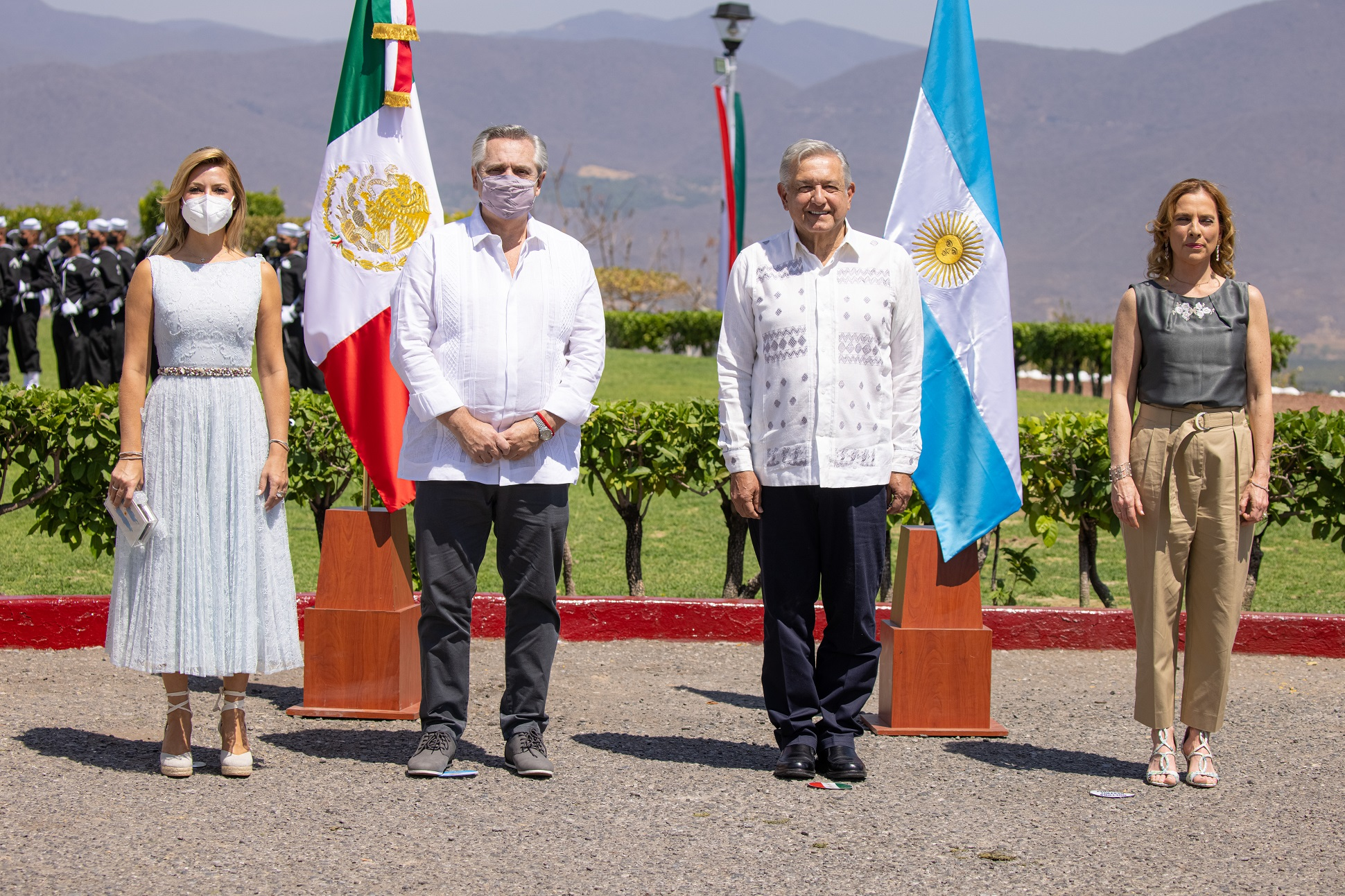
Mexican President Andrés Manuel López Obrador along with Argentine President Alberto Fernández in Iguala, Mexico; February 2021.

Presidential visits from Argentina to Mexico

- President Raúl Alfonsín (1985, 1986, 1987)
- President Carlos Menem (1991, 1997)
- President Fernando de la Rúa (2000)
- President Eduardo Duhalde (2002)
- President Néstor Kirchner (2004, 2007)
- President Cristina Fernández de Kirchner (2010, 2011, 2012)
- President Alberto Fernández (2021)

Presidential visits from Mexico to Argentina

- President Adolfo López Mateos (1960)
- President Luis Echeverría (1974)
- President Miguel de la Madrid Hurtado (1984)
- President Carlos Salinas de Gortari (1990, 1992)
- President Ernesto Zedillo (1995, 1996)
- President Vicente Fox (2002, 2004, 2005)
- President Felipe Calderón (2008, 2010)
- President Enrique Peña Nieto (2012, 2016, 2018)

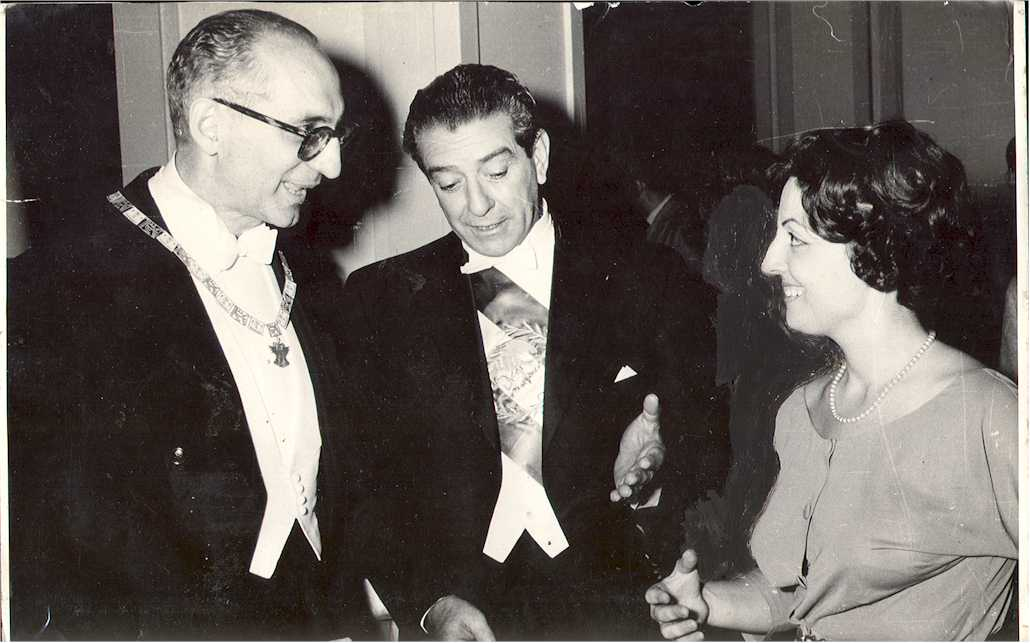
Mexican President Adolfo López Mateos on a state visit to Argentina meeting with Argentine President Arturo Frondizi in Buenos Aires; 1960.

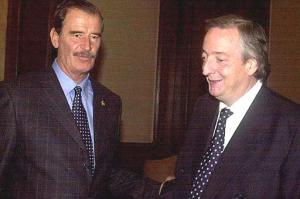
President Vicente Fox and President Néstor Kirchner in Monterrey, Mexico; January 2004.

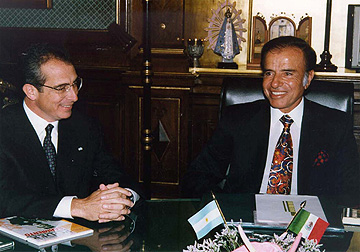
President Ernesto Zedillo and President Carlos Menem in Buenos Aires; November 1996.

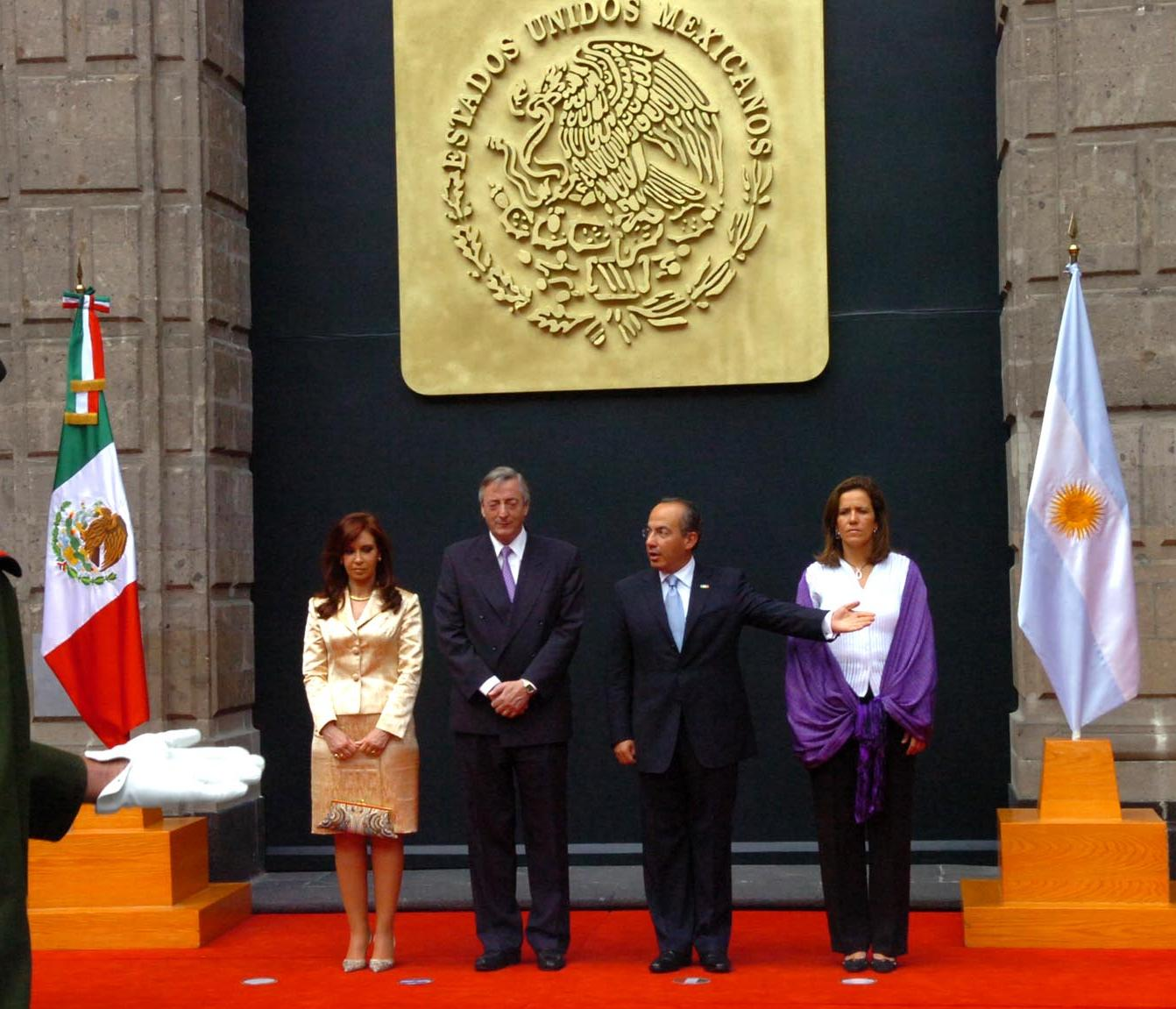
President Néstor Kirchner and President Felipe Calderón in Mexico City; July 2007.

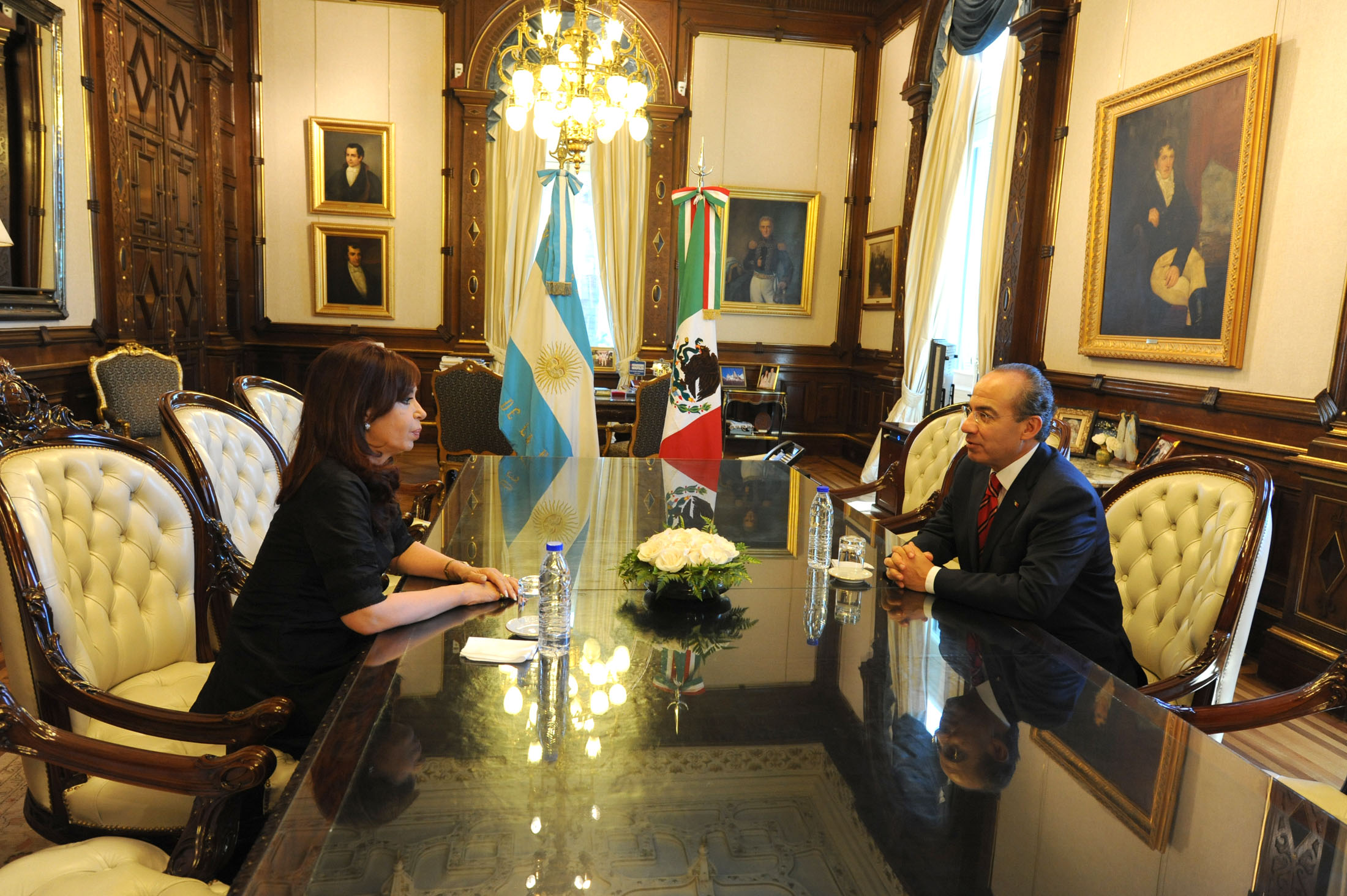
President Cristina Fernández de Kirchner and President Felipe Calderón in Buenos Aires; 2010.

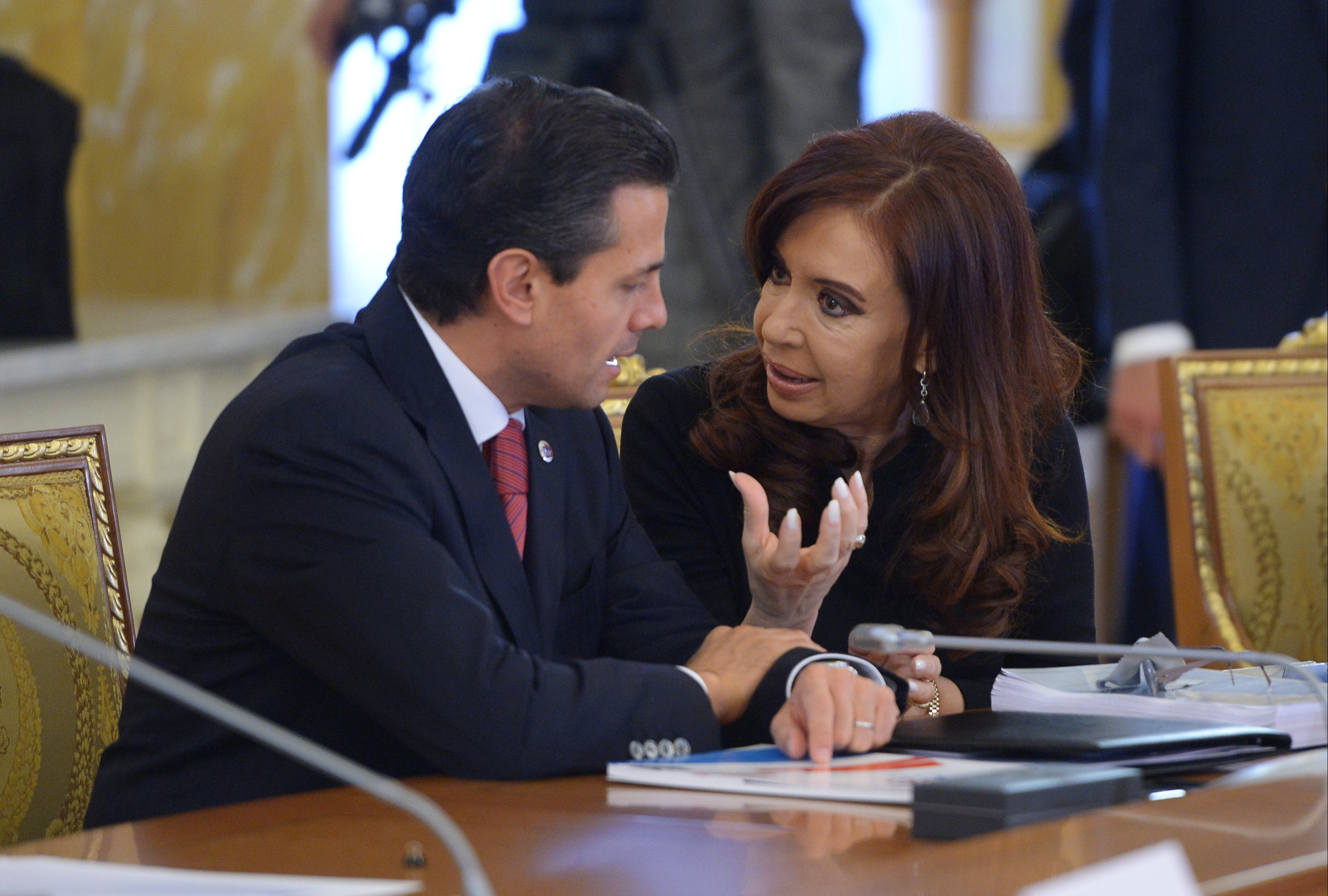
President Enrique Peña Nieto and President Cristina Fernández de Kirchner in Saint Petersburg, Russia; September 2013.

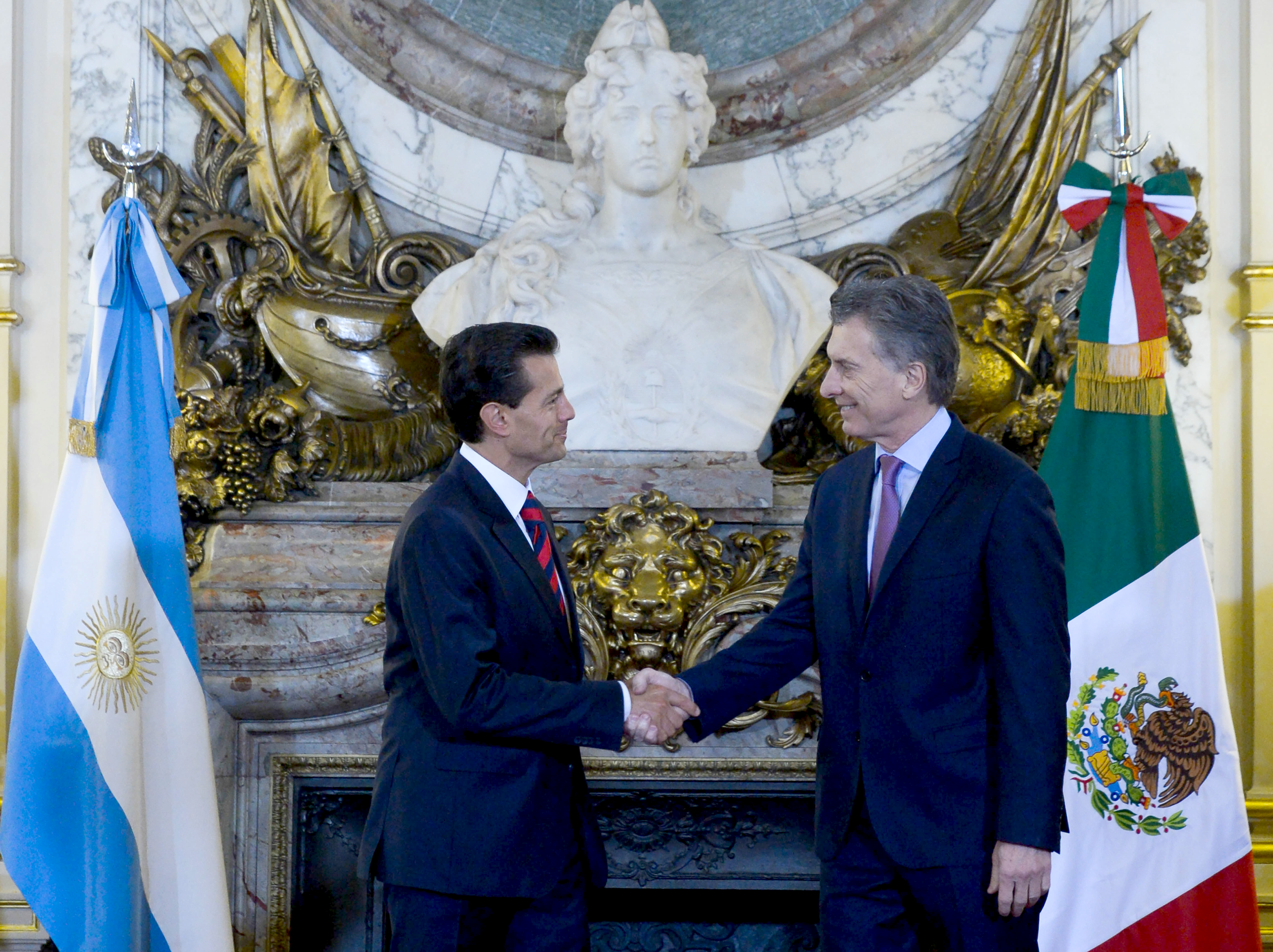
President Enrique Peña Nieto and President Mauricio Macri in Buenos Aires; July 2016.

== Bilateral agreements ==
Both nations have signed numerous bilateral agreements such as an Arbitration Agreement (1902); Agreement on Air Transport (1969); Agreement of Economic Cooperation (1984); Agreement on Economic and Social Planning (1984); Agreement on the Transfer of Convicted Nationals and Compliance with Criminal Sentences (1990); Agreement of Cooperation for the Fight against the Abuse and Illicit Trafficking of Narcotic Drugs and Psychotropic Substances (1992); Agreement for Touristic Cooperation (1992); Agreement of Cooperation in Cinematographic Co-production (1996); Agreement for the Promotion and Reciprocal Protection of Investments (1996); Agreement for Cultural and Educational Cooperation (1996); Agreement for Technical and Scientific Cooperation (1996); Agreement on the Mutual Recognition for Degrees, Diplomas and Academic Degrees of Higher Education (1997); Agreement Concerning Reciprocity in the use of Satellites and the Transmission and reception of signals from satellites for the provision of Satellite Services (1997); Agreement of Cooperation for the Peaceful Uses of Nuclear Energy (2002); Cooperation Treaty on Legal Assistance in Criminal Matters (2002); Extradition Treaty (2011); Agreement of Cooperation, Mutual Administrative Assistance and Exchange of Information in Customs Matters (2014) and an Agreement to Avoid Double Taxation and to Prevent Tax Evasion Regarding Taxes on Income and Equity (2015).

== Transportation and tourism ==
There are direct flights between Argentina and Mexico with Aerolíneas Argentinas and Aeroméxico.

In 2025, more than 390,000 Argentine citizens visited Mexico, becoming the 5th highest country to send tourists to the country (and second highest Latin American nation after Colombia). In 2018, more than 90,000 Mexican citizens travelled to Argentina for tourism.

== Trade relations ==
Over the years, two-way trade between Argentina and Mexico has increased substantially. In 2023, trade between the two nations totaled US$2.3 billion. Argentina's exports to Mexico include: aluminum, cowhide (leather), medicine and raw minerals. Mexico's exports to Argentina include: automobiles and parts, electronics (mobile phones) and chemical based products. Over 34 Argentine companies operate in Mexico with several multinational Argentinian companies operating in Mexico such as Bridas Corporation, Gupo Arcor and Techint. Several multinational Mexican companies operate in Argentina such as América Móvil, Cemex, Cinépolis, Coppel, Grupo Bimbo, Grupo Rotoplas, Mabe and Orbia (among others).

== Resident diplomatic missions ==
of Argentina in Mexico

- Mexico City (Embassy)
- Mexico City (Consulate-General)
- Playa del Carmen (Consulate)

of Mexico in Argentina

- Buenos Aires (Embassy)

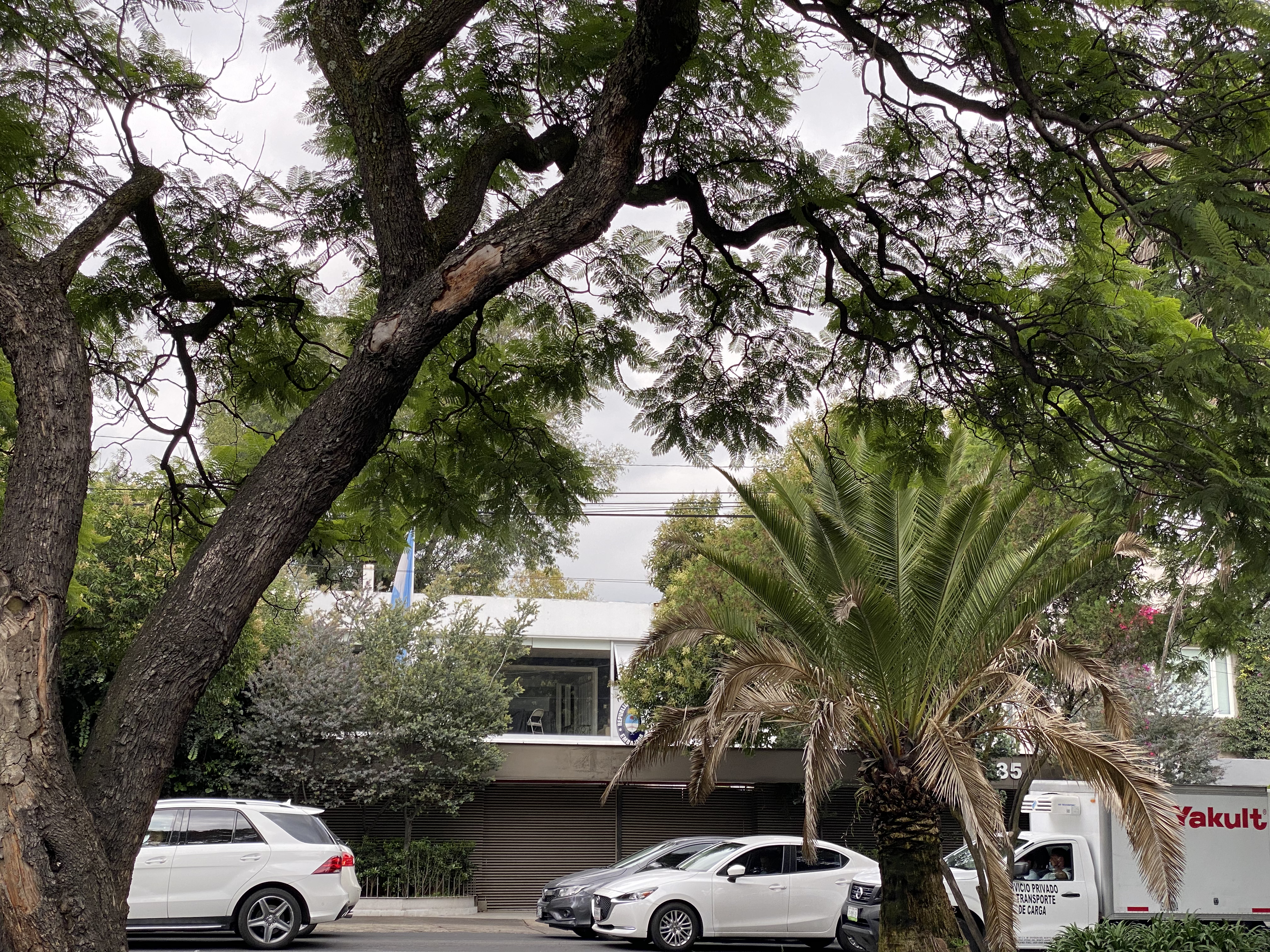
Embassy of Argentina in Mexico City

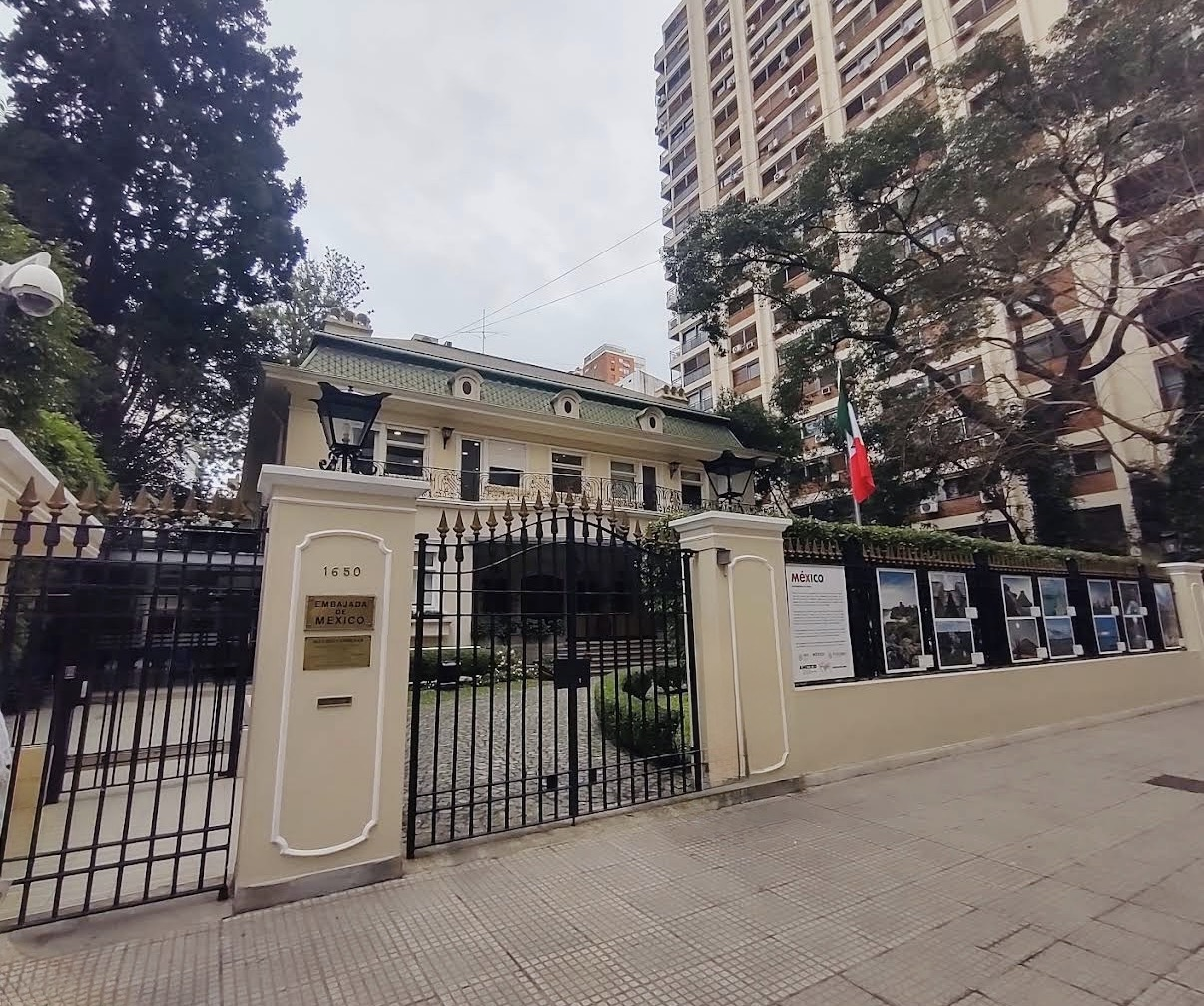
Embassy of Mexico in Buenos Aires

== Gallery ==
Legation of Mexico in Buenos Aires in 1923

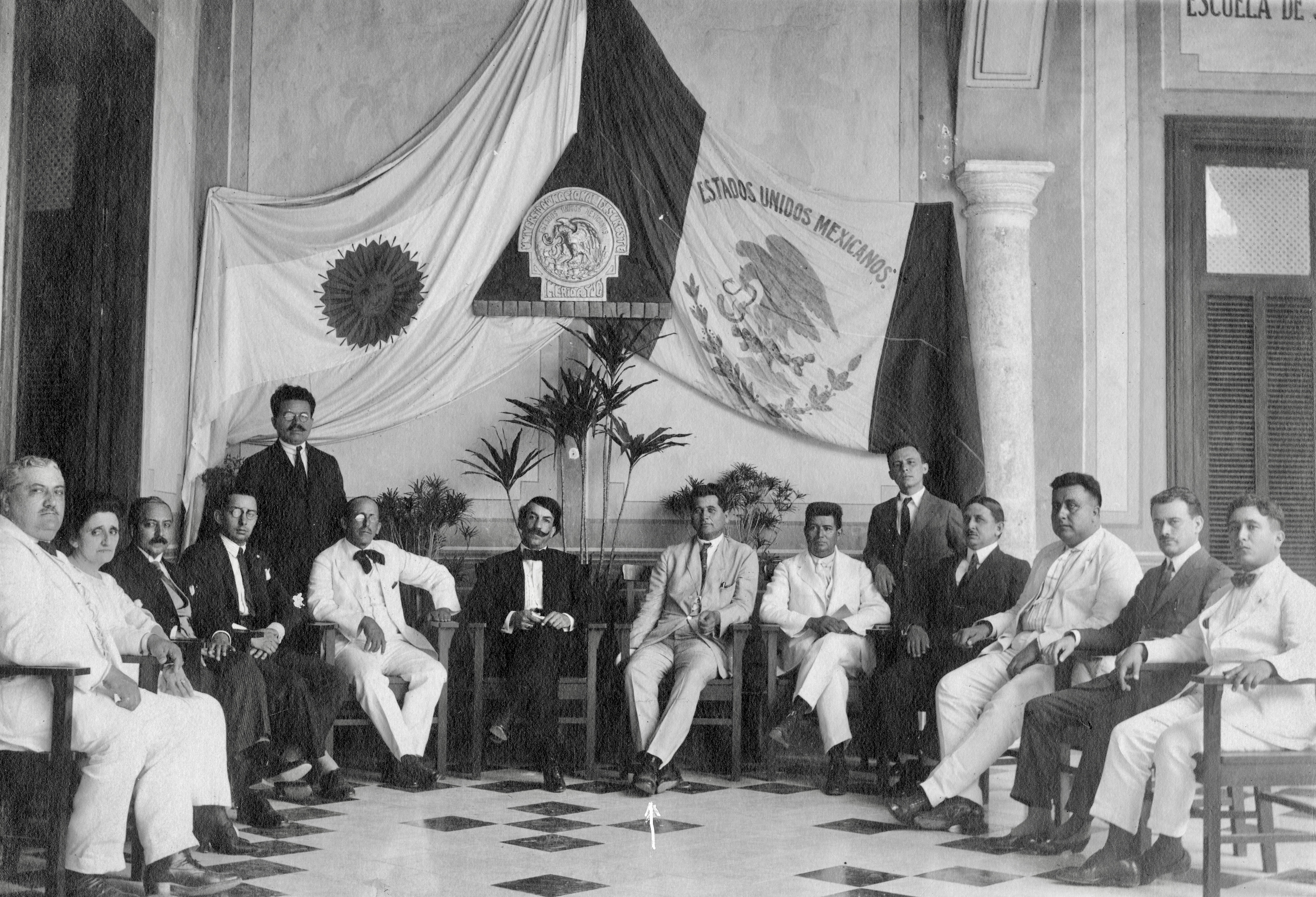
Flags of Argentina and Mexico in 1923

Bust of Argentine Liberator José de San Martín in Mexico City

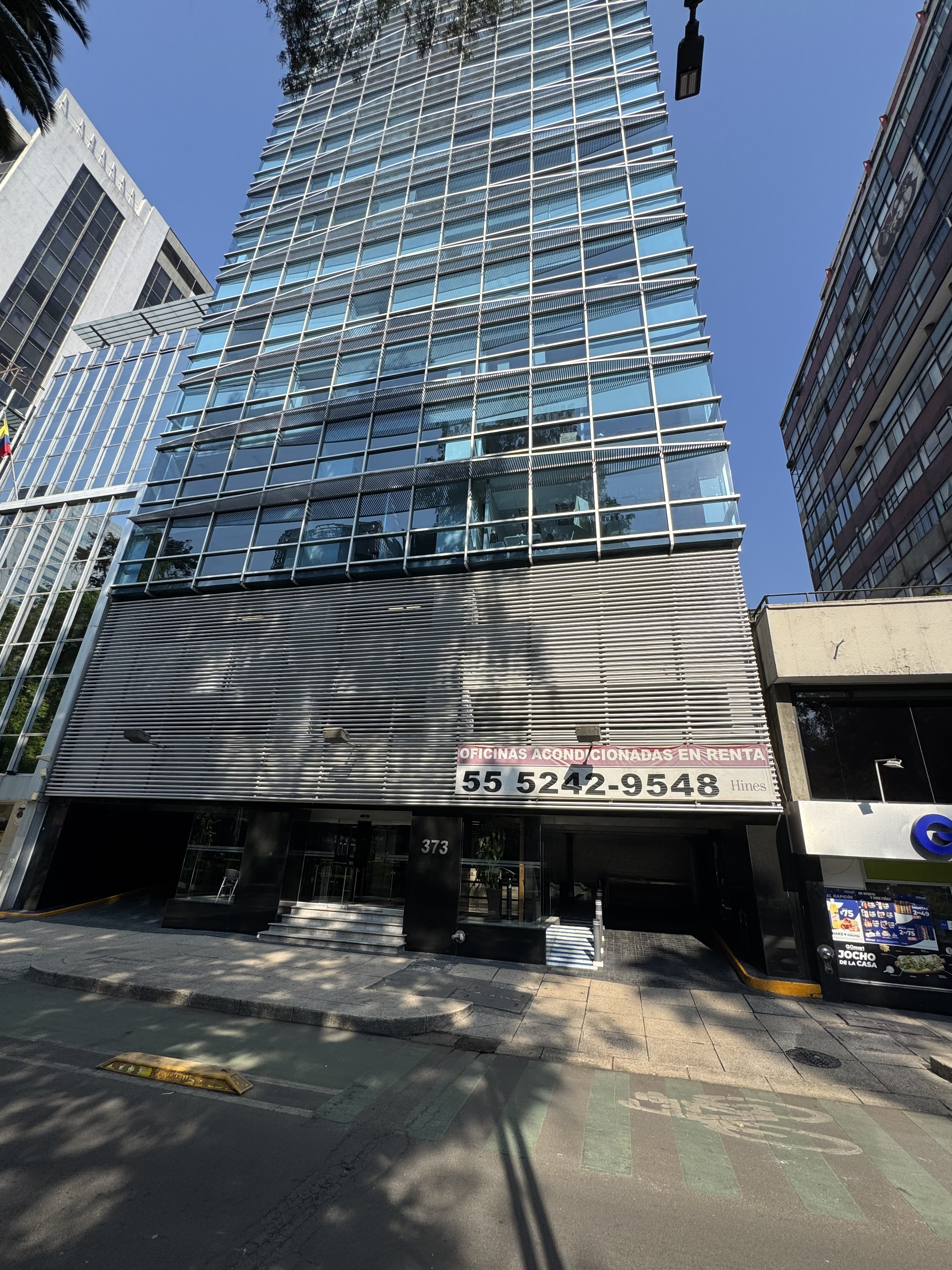
Building hosting the Consulate-General of Argentina in Mexico City

== See also ==
- Argentine Mexicans
