= Kenya–Mexico relations =

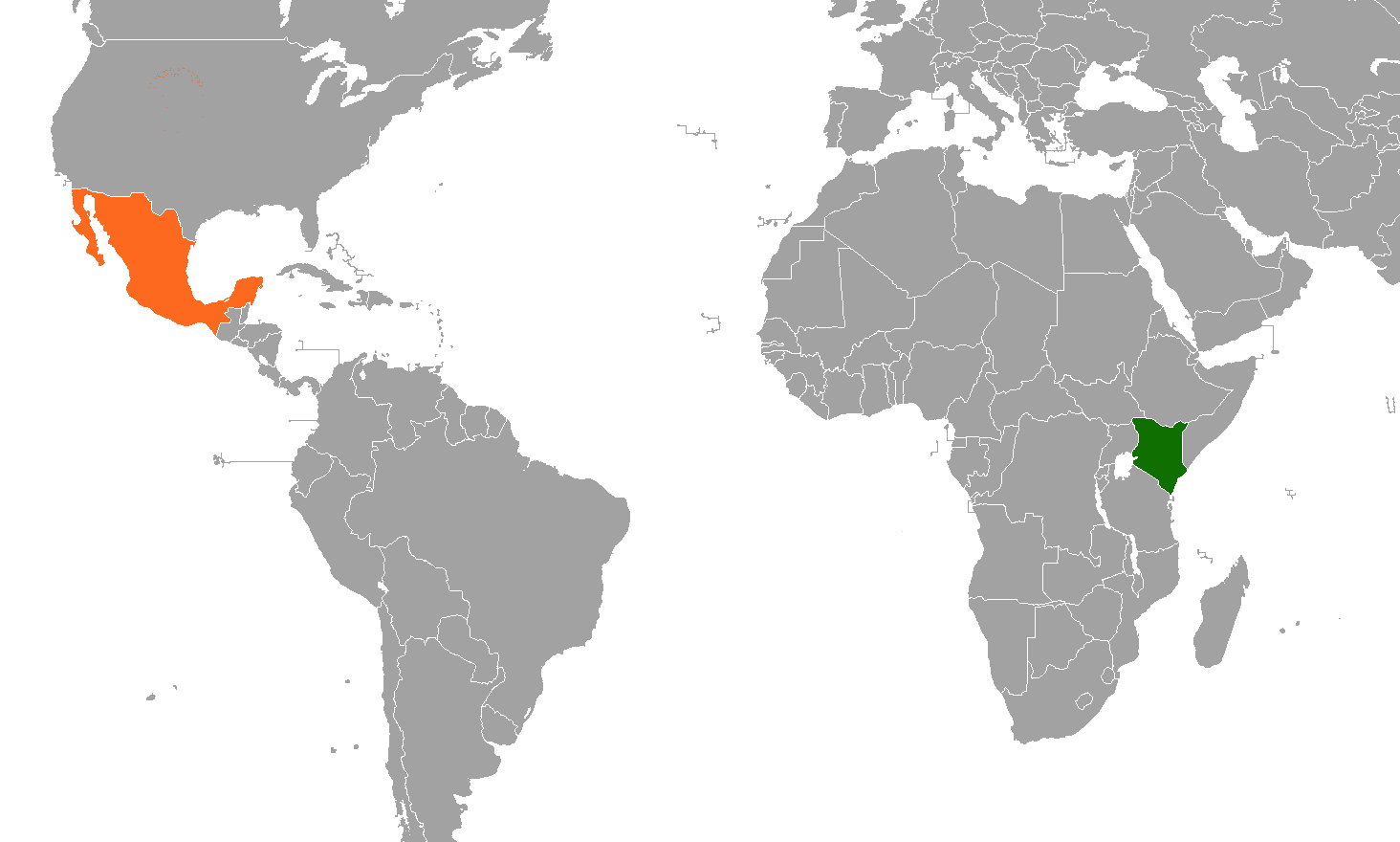

- Kenya: Mexico

The nations of Kenya and Mexico established diplomatic relations in 1977. Both nations are members of the Group of 15, Group of 24 and the United Nations.

== History ==
Kenya and Mexico established diplomatic relations on 15 March 1977, fourteen years after Kenya gained independence from the United Kingdom. In March 1981, Mexico opened an embassy in Nairobi. Since the establishment of diplomatic relations, both nations have increased their involvements in mutual scientific, educational and cultural exchanges cooperation.

In 2010, Mexico hosted the United Nations Climate Change Conference in Cancún. Among the invitees was Prime Minister Raila Odinga. During the conference, Mexican President Felipe Calderón and Prime Minister Odinga met and during their reunion both leaders discussed increasing high level discussions between leaders of both nations and reaching agreements on education, environment, aeronautic cooperation, health and extradition. In 2011 and again in 2014; Kenyan parliamentary delegations visited Mexico to discuss issues on national security, combating organized crime, refugees and financial cooperation.

In 2014, Mexico Secretary for the Environment, Juan José Guerra Abud, paid a visit to Nairobi to attend the first universal assembly meeting for the United Nations Environment Programme. In May 2018, Ambassador Tom Amolo, Political and Diplomatic Secretary in the Ministry of Foreign Affairs & International Trade of Kenya, paid a visit to Mexico to attend the second meeting between both nations on common interests and to strengthen political and economic cooperation.

In 2020, both nations held their third Meeting on Political Consultation Mechanism which was held virtually. Over the years, Mexican cuisine, alcohol and telenovelas have made an impact in Kenya.

In June 2026, Kenya opened an embassy in Mexico City.

== High-level visits ==
High-level visits from Kenya to Mexico

- Prime Minister Raila Odinga (2010)
- Political and Diplomatic Secretary Tom Amolo (2018)

High-level visits from Mexico to Kenya

- Secretary of the Environment Juan José Guerra Abud (2014)
- Director General for Africa and the Middle East Jorge Álvarez Fuentes (2018)
- Undersecretary for Multilateral Affairs and Human Rights Martha Delgado (2019)
- Undersecretary for Human Rights and Migration Alejandro Encinas Rodríguez (2019)

== Bilateral relations ==
Both nations have signed several bilateral agreements such as an Agreement of Cooperation (1995); Agreement to Establish Consultations on Mutual Interests (2007); Agreement of Cooperation on the Protection and Conservation of Species and the Environment (2007); Agreement on the Cooperation in Education for Diplomacy and International Relations (2008); Agreement on Cooperation in Health (2010) and an Agreement on Cooperation for the Administration of Independent Election Commissions (2011).

== Kenyan migration to Mexico ==
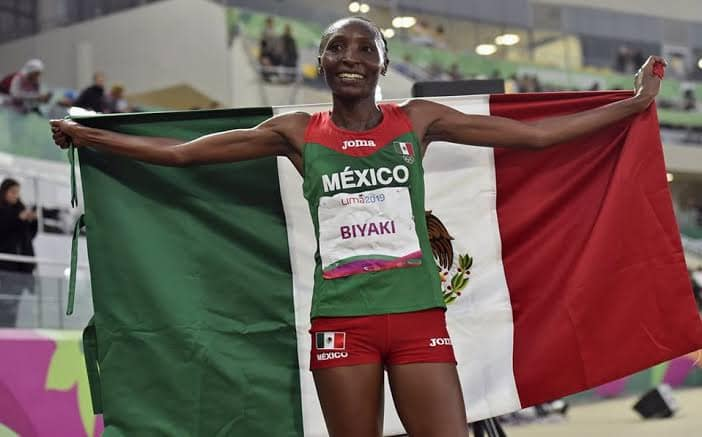
Naturalized Kenyan-Mexican Risper Biyaki Gesabwa earning a silver medal in the women's 10,000 meter race for Mexico at the 2019 Pan-American Games.

Kenyans are a recent immigrant group in Mexico and are made up primarily of athletes and their families. These individuals have arrived to train at high altitudes for endurance running. The largest Kenyan community is found in Toluca which has an elevation of 2,667m and is in proximity to the 4,680m Nevado de Toluca. The state of Zacatecas is also a destination due to the elevation and similarity to the geography of Kenya. Another factor that makes Mexico appealing to athletes is its location for easy access to marathons in North and South America. These resident Kenyans dominate national marathons. Many of these runners save winnings to send to their families in Kenya.

A small group of Kenyans with Mexican citizenship are notably professionals or students. Such notable individuals include runner Hillary Kipchirchir Kimaiyo, actor Arap Bethke, actress Lupita Nyong'o and runner Risper Biyaki Gesabwa.

== Trade relations ==
In 2023, two-way trade between both nations amounted to US$21.4 million. Kenya's main exports to Mexico include: seeds, fruits, vegetables and vegetable oil, coffee, tea, clothing, and titanium ores. Mexico's main exports to Kenya include: malt extract, alcohol, compression-ignition internal combustion piston engines, telephones and mobile phones, medicine, and petroleum. Mexican multinational companies such as Gruma and Grupo Rotoplas operate in Kenya.

== Resident diplomatic missions ==
- Kenya has an embassy in Mexico City.
- Mexico has an embassy in Nairobi.
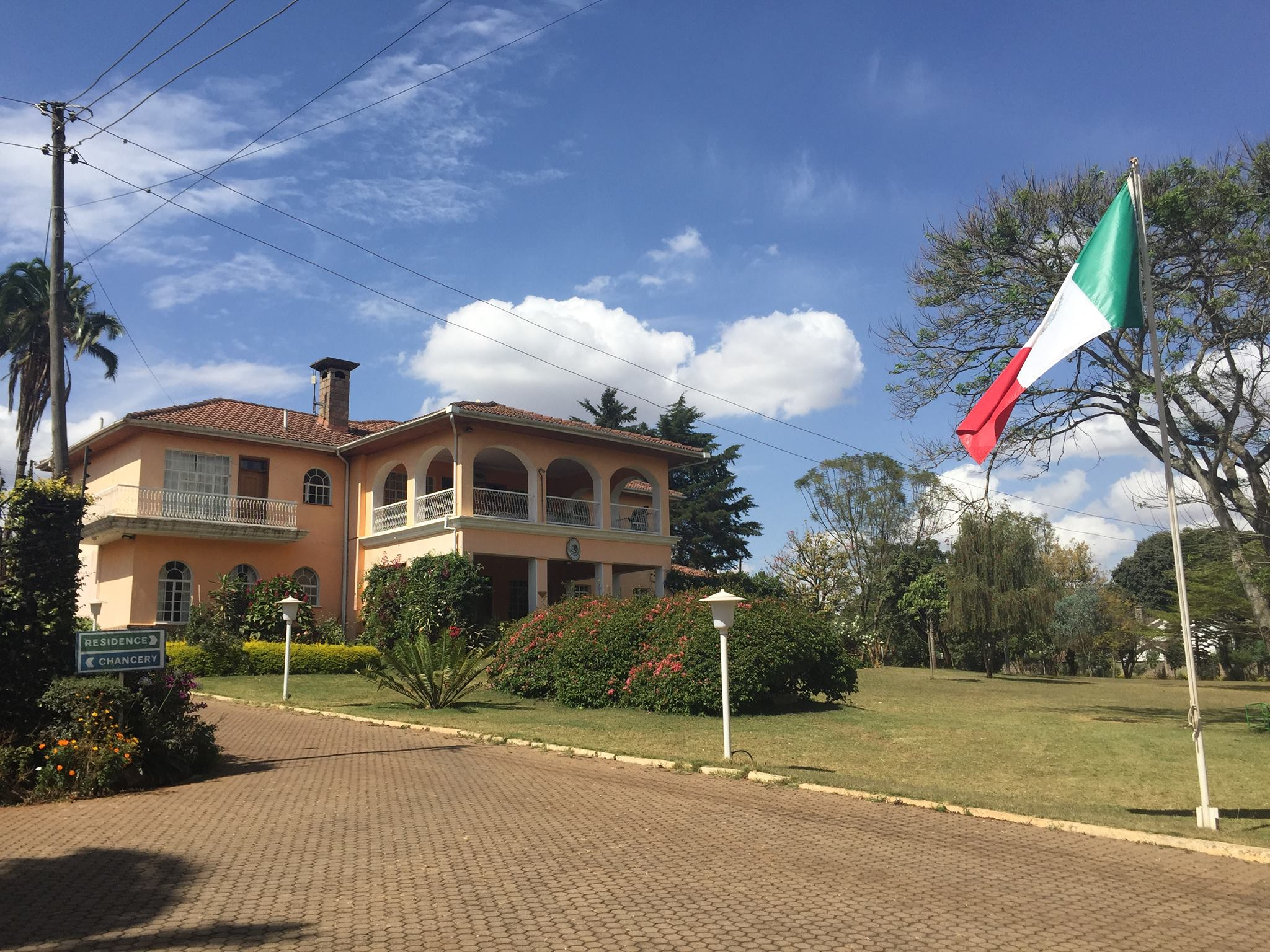
Embassy of Mexico in Nairobi
