= Argentine Mexicans =

Argentine Mexican argentino-mexicano
Total population
- 19,214 Argentina-born residents (2017); Unknown number of Mexicans of Argentine descent

Regions with significant populations
- Mexico City, Guadalajara, Monterrey, Puebla, León, Quintana Roo, Baja California, Querétaro, State of Mexico, Sonora, Mérida

Languages
- Spanish · Italian · German · English

Religion
- Christianity • Judaism

Related ethnic groups
- Argentine diaspora (Argentine American • Argentine Australian • Argentine Spaniard • Argentine Brazilian)

There is a significant Argentine diaspora in Mexico. According to the 2010 census, there were 13,696 registered Argentine citizens living in Mexico, an increase from the 6,465 registered in the 2000 census. Argentine immigrants constitute the second largest community of South Americans in Mexico (after Colombian Mexicans) and the fifth largest immigrant community overall.

The Argentine-Mexican community is sometimes known as ArgenMex.

== History ==
Argentines have been in Mexico since at least the 1895 census, and periodic migration has continued following the ebb and flow of the Argentine economy. Both countries share the Spanish language; their historical origins are common (part of the Spanish Empire). With two main emigrant waves; during the 1970s Dirty War and after the 2001 economic crisis.

The largest Argentine community is in Mexico City (with a sizeable congregation in the Condesa neighborhood) and there are smaller communities in Leon, Guadalajara, Puebla, Cancun, Playa del Carmen, Tulum, Mérida, Monterrey and Tampico. Most Argentines established in Mexico come from the provinces of Buenos Aires, Santa Fe, Cordoba and Tucuman. The Argentine community has participated in the opening of establishments such as restaurants, bars, boutiques, modeling consultants, foreign exchange interbank markets, among other lines of business.

== Culture ==
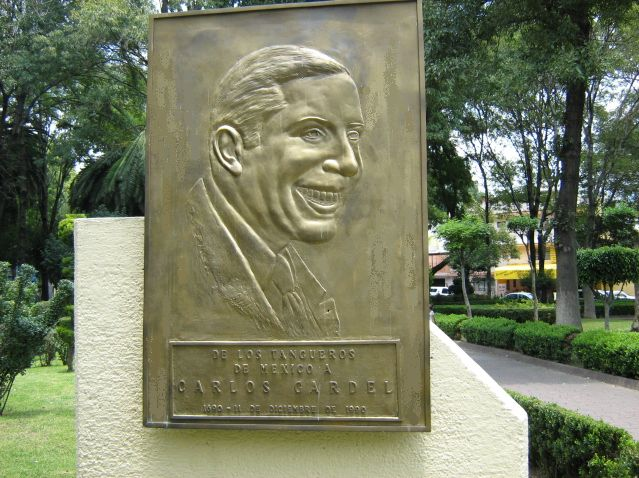
Carlos Gardel, tango icon from Buenos Aires.

Argentine actors have an important presence in Mexico's television industry. Frequently, actors arrive in Mexico to learn neutral Spanish (based on Mexican Spanish and used for mass media distributed across Latin America, such as dubbed foreign films,) and remain as they find work with one of the country's major television networks. Notable among these actors are the telenovela galanes (male leads) Juan Soler and Sebastian Rulli. In the music industry, prominent Argentine-Mexicans include Amanda Miguel, Fey and Noel Schajris.

There has been controversy in Mexico over the inclusion of naturalized Mexicans (especially Argentine-Mexicans) on Mexico's national football team. The arguments range from xenophobic ideas to the belief that Argentines have been granted citizenship in order to be eligible players on the team. Nonetheless, Argentines wanting to attain Mexican citizenship have to do so through meeting naturalization and residency requirements.

== Table of migratory flows ==
Argentine immigration in Mexico from 2000 to 2020
Year	Argentine residents
2000	2 823
2010	10 067 and up
2020	18 693 and up

== Argentine-Mexicans ==
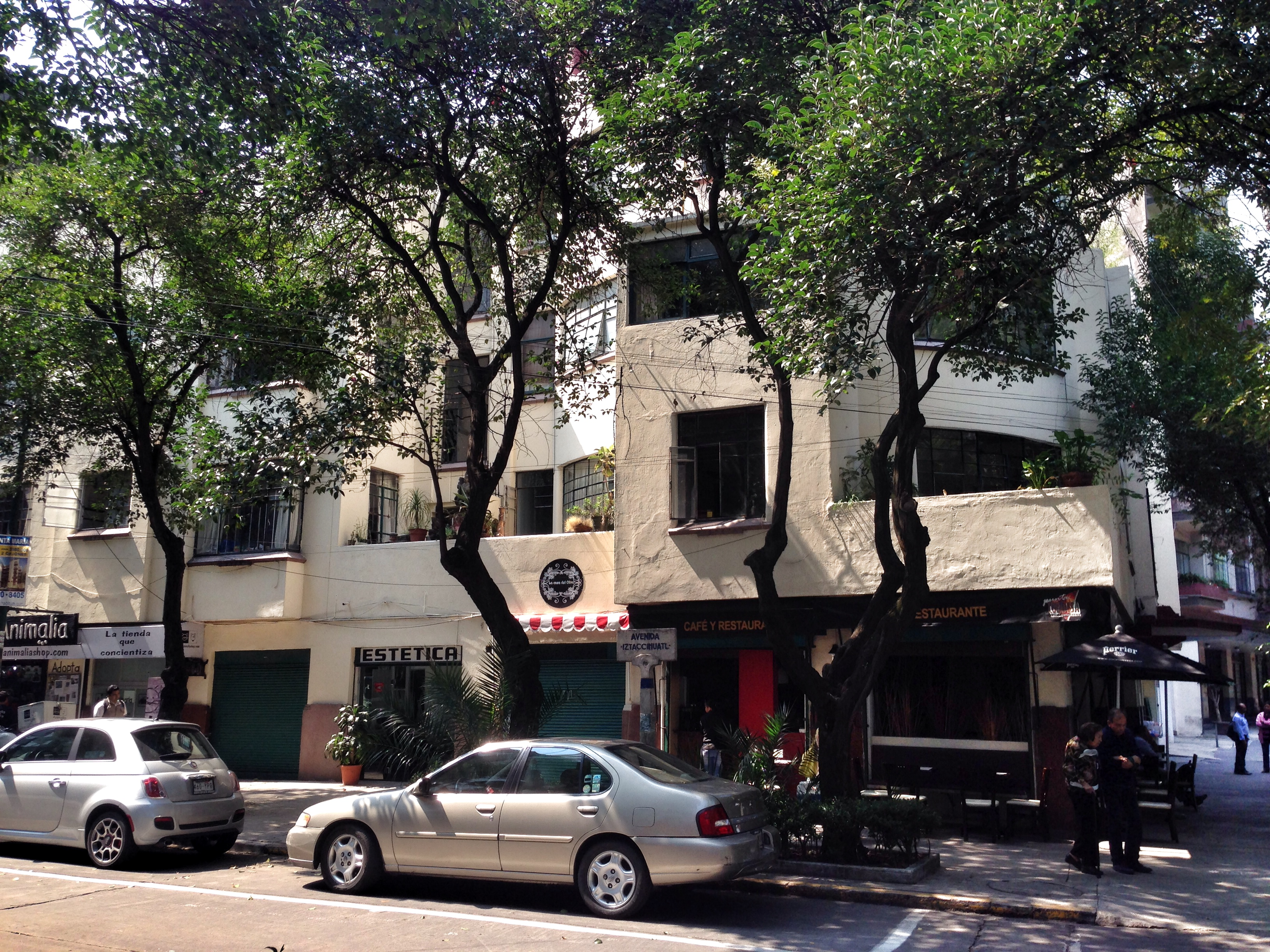
Colonia Condesa, urban sector where the largest Argentine community in Mexico City is concentrated.

=== Notable Argentine Mexicans ===
- Libertad Lamarque, actress and singer.
- Christian Bach, model and actress.
- Juan Gelman, poet.
- Enrique Dussel, writer and philosopher.
- Guillermo Franco, former footballer.
- Santiago Giménez, footballer.
- Germán Berterame, footballer.
- Rogelio Funes Mori, footballer.
- Christian Giménez (footballer, born 1981), former footballer.

=== Notable Mexicans with Argentine origins ===
- Sebastián Zurita, actor.
- Emmanuel (singer), singer.
- Alexander Acha, singer.

=== In Fiction ===
- Rex Salazar, main character of the Animated series Generator Rex.

== See also ==
- Argentina–Mexico relations
- Argentine diaspora
- Ethnic groups in Mexico
