= Grupo Rotoplas =

Mexican water tank and pipe manufacturer

Grupo Rotoplas, S.A.B. de C.V.
- Rotoplas Logo with phrase: más y mejor agua (More and better water)

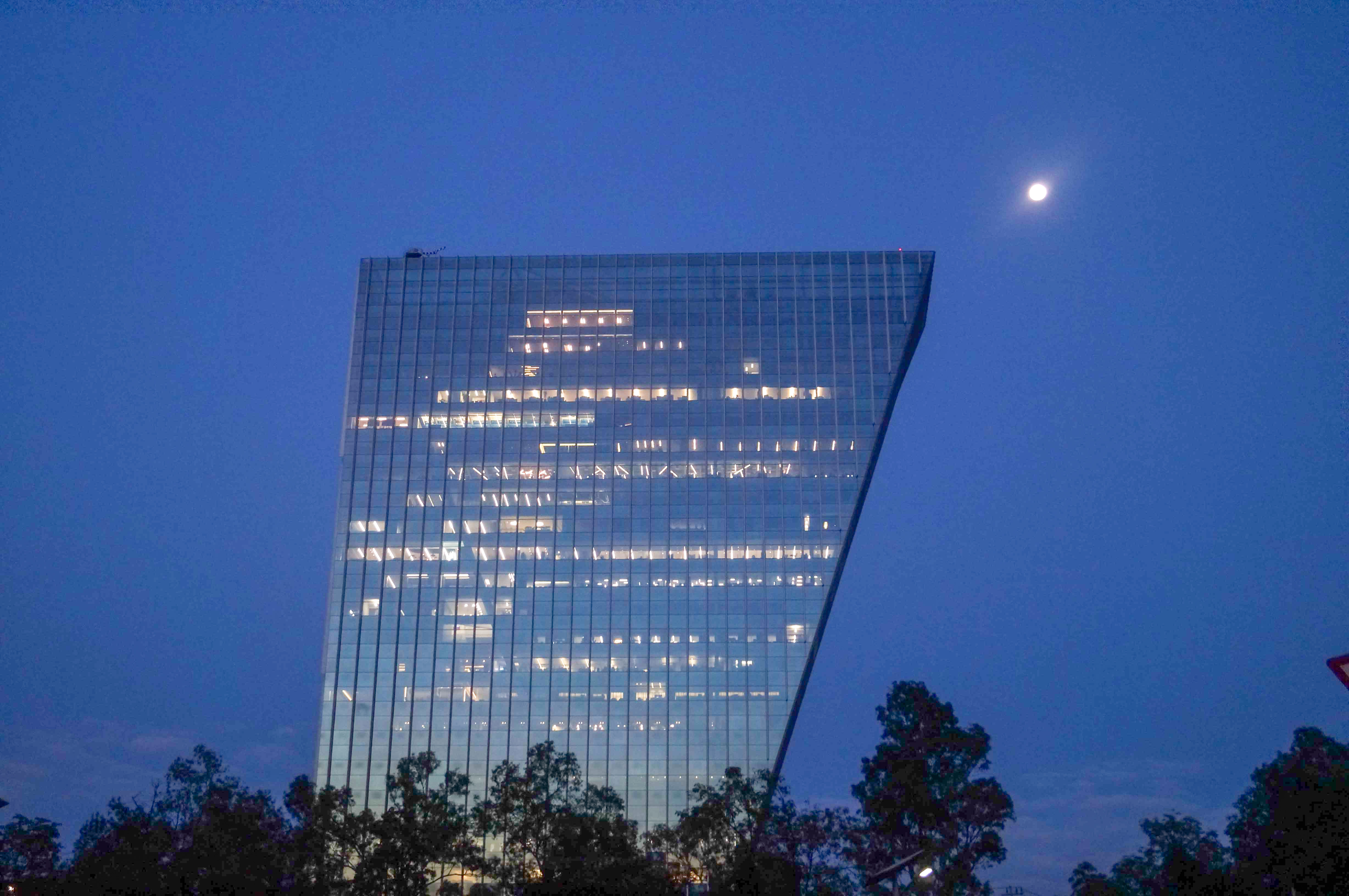
- Torre Virreyes, Rotoplas offices located in this tower
- Company type: Sociedad Anónima Bursátil de Capital Variable
- Traded as: BMV: AGUA
- Industry: Water
- Founded: February 2, 1978; 48 years ago
- Founder: Carlos Rojas Mota Velasco
- Headquarters: Miguel Hidalgo, Mexico City, Mexico
- Area served: Latin America and the United States
- Key people: Carlos Rojas Mota Velasco (President); Carlos Rojas Aboumrad (CEO)
- Products: Water tanks filtration
- Operating income: US$435 million (2020)
- Net income: US$640 million (2020)
- Number of employees: 3, 222 (2020)
- Divisions: Acuantia; Bebbia; IPS, Instalamos Confianza; Señorial; Tuboplus; Plastic-Mart; Rieggo; Tank Depot
- Website: rotoplas.com

Grupo Rotoplas, S.A.B. de C.V. (English: Rotoplas Group) or simply Rotoplas is a Mexican multinational company dedicated to the manufacture of water storage and filtration tanks based in Miguel Hidalgo, Mexico City. It has a presence in 13 Latin American countries and the United States. Its main market is Mexico but it also has a presence in Argentina, Brazil, Chile, Costa Rica, El Salvador, Guatemala, Honduras, Nicaragua, Panama, Peru and Uruguay.

== History ==
=== Origins ===
Rotoplas was founded on February 2, 1978, by Carlos Rojas Mota Velasco in Coyoacán, Mexico City as a small business with less than 30 employees. In its beginnings it was dedicated to manufacturing pots for gardening and milk tanks. In 1989, it began manufacturing industrial polyethylene tanks using the rotational molding technique. In 1995, two product lines were sold in 3,000 points of sale in Mexico with 8 plants. Its popularity led the company to have up to 90% market share in the [mid-1990s. In 1996, they expanded abroad for the first time, beginning to sell their products in Guatemala. As of 2005, its main and only business focuses on the manufacture of water tanks or derivatives. On December 10, 201], they were listed on the Mexican Stock Exchange (BMV) under the ticker symbol "AGUA" ("WATER"). They entered the United States by acquiring Plastic Mart and Tank Depot in 2017 the two leading water storage tank providers in the US.

== Acquisitions ==
In 2010 the group of shareholders acquired the stake in Aqua International Partners. In 2016, they acquired all the shares of the Argentine company Talsar, S.A. dedicated to water heaters for 642 million Mexican pesos. In 2018, they acquired all the shares of the Argentine company IPS dedicated to the thermoplastic industry, being the main exporter of pipes and connections in 35 countries in addition to providing solutions to professional installers.
