= List of people from Aleppo =

The following is a list of notable people from Aleppo, Syria.

== Notable natives ==
=== Politicians ===
- Abd al-Rahman al-Kayyali, politician
- Ahmad Qanbar, politician
- Aram Karamanoukian, politician
- Edmond Al-Homsi, politician
- Husni al-Za'im, military leader
- Ibrahim Hananu, politician and statesman
- Jamil Ibrahim Pasha, politician
- Jacobo Harrotian, Mexican General during the revolution
- Mar'i Pasha al-Mallah, politician and statesman
- Maarouf al-Dawalibi, politician and statesman
- Mikhail Ilyan, politician
- Mustafa Bey Barmada, politician and statesman
- Naim Antaki, politician and statesman
- Nazim al-Qudsi, politician and statesman a
- Rashad Barmada, politician and statesman
- Rushdi al-Kikhya, politician and statesman
- Saadallah al-Jabiri, politician and statesman
- Sami al-Hinnawi, military leader
- Sarkis Assadourian, politician
- Sayf al-Dawla, ruler of Hamadanid dynasty
- Subhi Barakat, politician and statesman
- Levon Ter-Petrossian, former president of Armenia
- Vartan Oskanian, Armenian politician
- Zeki Pasha, field marshal of the Ottoman forces

=== Thinkers and writers ===
- Abd al-Masih al-Antaki
- Abd al-Rahman al-Kawakibi, thinker and religious reformer
- Rima Bali
- Abdallah Marrash
- Francis Marrash
- Maryana Marrash
- Al-Ma'arri, philosopher and thinker
- Antranig Dzarugian, Armenian novelist and poet
- Buhturi, Arab poet
- Georges Tarabichi, writer and translator
- Jacob of Edessa, Syriac writer and theologian
- Omar Abu-Riche, Syrian poet
- Paul of Aleppo, theologian, traveler and chronicler
- Qustaki al-Himsi, writer and poet
- Rizqallah Hassun, founder of the first Arabic newspaper in 1855
- Sati' al-Husri, educationalist and thinker
- Seta Dadoyan, Armenian scholar and historian
- Muhammed Abu Maatouk
- Hanna Diyab
- Hazar Tabbakh, poet
- Jibra'il Dallal, poet and writer
- Yervant Pamboukian, historian

=== Sciences ===
- Khaled Almilaji
- Riad Barmada
- Mohammad Marashi
- Zein E. Obagi

=== Businesspeople ===
- Edmond Safra, banker
- Jacob Safra, banker
- Joseph Safra, banker
- Mohammed Mohiedin Anis
- Ronaldo Mouchawar, entrepreneur, founder of Souq.com
- Sam Yagan, Internet entrepreneur

=== Art collectors ===
- David Nahmad
- Ezra Nahmad
- Fateh Moudarres, painter
- Fritzie Abadi
- Giuseppe Nahmad
- Helly Nahmad (London)
- Helly Nahmad (New York art collector)
- Jean Carzou, French-Armenian painter
- Louay Kayali, Painter
- Wahbi al-Hariri, artist and architect

=== Artists ===
- Abed Azrie
- Jean Boghossian
- Avraam Russo, Russian pop singer
- Fritzie Abadi
- Bassam Kousa
- George Tutunjian, Armenian revolutionary songs performer
- Moustapha Akkad, film producer and director
- Sabah Fakhri, Arabic traditional songs performer
- Shadi Jamil
- Feras Fayyad
- Marie Rose Abousefian
- Nour Mhanna

=== Religious leaders ===
- Abd al-Fattah Abu Ghudda
- Muhammad 'Awwamah
- Ali Sadreddine Al-Bayanouni
- Hilarion Capucci, titular archbishop of Caesarea
- Saint Maron, figure in Christianity
- Simeon Stylites, figure in Christianity
- Zaki Cohen

=== Athletics ===
- Ammar Rihawi, footballer
- Michel Madanly, basketball player
- Mohammad Afash, footballer
- Philipp Stamma, chess master and writer

=== Other ===
- Hala Gorani, TV anchor
- Abdulrahman Akkad, LGBT Rights Activist
- Muhammed Faris, first Syrian cosmonaut

== Families ==
- Dakhel
- Al-Jabiri
- Al-Qudsi
- Barmada
- Kayali
- Khawam
- Nahmad
- Safra
- Khandakani

== See also ==
- Aleppo
- List of rulers of Aleppo
