= Hazara =

Hazara may refer to:

== Places and ethnic groups ==
=== Afghanistan ===
- Hazaras, an ethnic group and a principal component of the population of Afghanistan
  - Hazarajat, or Hazaristan, a region in central Afghanistan
  - List of Hazara tribes

=== Pakistan ===
- Hazara region in northern Pakistan, administratively in Hazara Division of the Khyber Pakhtunkhwa province
  - Hazarewal, the multi-ethnic community inhabitants of the Hazara region
  - Hazara Division, of the Khyber Pakhtunkhwa province
  - Hazara District, a former district of Peshawar Division in the North-West Frontier Province
  - Hazara University
- Hazara, Swat, Khyber Pakhtunkhwa
- Hazara Town, Quetta, Balochistan
- Takht Hazara, a village in Punjab

=== India ===
- Hazara, Punjab
- Hazara, Sultanpur Lodhi, Punjab

== People with the name ==
- List of Hazara people
- Abdul Khaliq Hazara (assassin) (1916–1933), assassinated the King of Afghanistan in 1933
- Abdul Khaliq Hazara (politician) (fl. from 2010), Pakistani politician
- Haji Sayed Hussain Hazara (1917–2002), Pakistani politician
- Kulsoom Hazara (born 1988), Pakistani karate practitioner
- Meena Hazara (fl. 2010), Pakistani karate practitioner
- Commander Shafi Hazara (fl. 1991–1996), ethnic Hazara military commander in Afghanistan

== See also ==
- Hazar (disambiguation)
- Hazari (disambiguation)
- Hazra (disambiguation)
- Hasara, a village in Nepal
- Hazaran, a mountainous area in Iran
- Hazare, a surname
