= Hazari =

Hazari may refer to:

== People ==
- Abdul Ghani Hazari (1921–1976), Bangladeshi poet and journalist
- Joynal Hazari (1945–2021), Bangladeshi politician
- Maheshwar Hazari (born 1971), Indian politician of Bihar
- Nizam Uddin Hazari (born 1966), Bangladeshi politician
- Hazari Lal Chauhan (born 1948), Indian politician
- Hazari Prasad Dwivedi (1907–1979), Hindi writer and scholar

== Other uses ==
- of or related to Hazaras, an ethnic group of Afghanistan
- of or related to Hazara region in Pakistan
- Hazari (musical group), a Serbian ethnic music group
- Hazari, a fictional alien species in the "Think Tank" episode of Star Trek: Voyager
- Hezari, Chabahar, a village in Iran
- Hezari, Qasr-e Qand, a village in Iran

== See also ==
- Hazara (disambiguation)
- Hasari (disambiguation)
- Hazare, a surname
- Tis Hazari, a neighborhood of Delhi, India
  - Tis Hazari metro station
