= Həzrə =

Həzrə, Hazra or variants may refer to:

- Həzrə, Qabala, Azerbaijan
- Həzrə, Qusar, Azerbaijan

== See also ==
- Hazara (disambiguation)
