= Hezar =

Hezar may refer to:

- Mount Hezar, in Iran
- Hezar, Fars, a village in Iran
- Hezar, Oman, a village in Oman

== See also ==
- Hazar (disambiguation)
