= Armenian Mexicans =

armenio-mexicanos Հայերը Մեքսիկայում

Total population
- ~3000

Languages
- Spanish, Armenian

Religion
- Christianity: (Armenian Apostolic Church and Armenian Catholic Church)

Related ethnic groups
- Armenians

The Armenian diaspora population in Mexico is very small in comparison with other immigrant groups. The majority of the population arrived in Mexico between 1910–1928, most of them arriving after the Armenian genocide of 1915.

== History ==
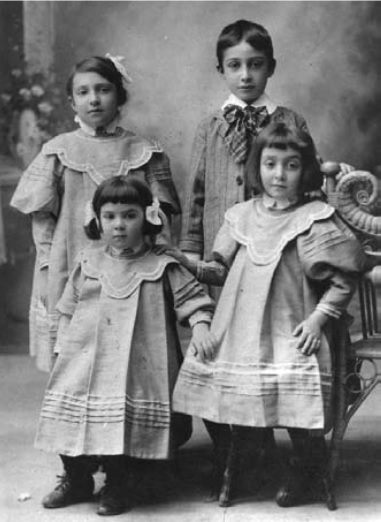
Mexican children of Armenian origin; 1911.

The earliest known record, from 1632, recorded the arrival of an Armenian national by the name of Francisco Martín in Mexico. In 1723, Armenian national Don Pedro de Zárate arrived to Mexico on a Spanish galleon from China to Acapulco. In 1897, Mexican President Porfirio Díaz planned a project to establish an agricultural community with Armenian settlers in Soto la Marina, Tamaulipas (in northern Mexico); the project, however, was never materialized. Soon after the Armenian genocide, committed by Ottoman forces in April 1915, many Armenians began to immigrate to the American continent. From 1921–1928, Mexico had an open immigration policy for most foreigners. During that time, close to 300 Armenians immigrated to Mexico.

Once in Mexico, most of the Armenian community headed north to the United States. The majority of those who stayed in the country settled in the La Merced neighborhood of Mexico City, where many began working as peddlers, shoemakers, and shop owners. Due to its relatively small size (when compared to the larger communities in Canada and United States), the Armenian community in Mexico never established a school or community center, which in turn allowed for the community to assimilate quickly into the larger Mexican population.

== Mexicans of Armenian ancestry ==
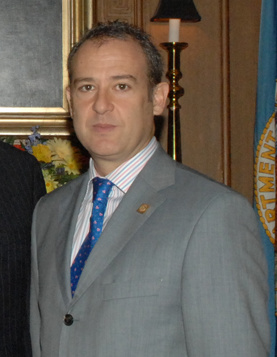
Arturo Sarukhán

- Mauricio Ochmann
- Berge Bulbulian
- Rosa Gloria Chagoyán
- Jacobo Harrotian
- Siouzana Melikián
- Armen Ohanian
- Jacobo Harrotian
- Paris Pişmiş
- Arturo Sarukhán

== See also ==
- Armenia–Mexico relations
- Armenian diaspora
- Immigration to Mexico
