= Swede Nordstrom =

American football player (1896–1963)

No. 10
- Position: Guard / Tackle

Personal information
- Born: October 11, 1896; Brooklyn, New York, U.S.
- Died: February 13, 1963 (aged 66); Toms River, New Jersey, U.S.
- Listed height: 6 ft 2 in (1.88 m)
- Listed weight: 238 lb (108 kg)

Career information
- High school: Bay Ridge (Brooklyn)
- College: Trinity (CT)

Career history
- New York Giants (1925); Brooklyn Lions (1926)
- Stats at Pro Football Reference

Harry William "Swede" Nordstrom (October 11, 1896 – February 13, 1963) was an American professional football guard who played two seasons in the National Football League (NFL) with the New York Giants and Brooklyn Lions. He played college football at Trinity College.

== Early life and college ==
Harry William Nordstrom was born on October 11, 1896, in Brooklyn, New York. He attended Bay Ridge High School in Bay Ridge, Brooklyn, New York.

Nordstrom played college football for the Trinity Bantams of Trinity College. He was a two-year letterman in 1915 and 1916.

== Professional career ==
Nordstrom signed with the New York Giants of the National Football League (NFL) in 1925. He played in four games for the Giants during the team's inaugural 1925 season before being released. He was listed as a guard / tackle with the Giants and wore jersey number 10.

Nordstrom signed with the NFL's Brooklyn Lions in 1926. He appeared in four games, starting one, for the Lions that year before his release.

== Personal life ==
Nordstrom died on February 13, 1963, in Toms River, New Jersey.
