= Hezari =

Hezari or Hazari (Persian: هزاري) may refer to:

- Hezari, Chabahar
- Hezari, Qasr-e Qand
