= Hazra Mausoleum Complex =

Historic site in Hazra, Azerbaijan

Hazra Mausoleum Complex Həzrə türbələr kompleksi

Religion
- District: Qabala District

Location
- Location: Hazra
- Country: Azerbaijan
- Interactive map of Hazra Mausoleum Complex; Həzrə türbələr kompleksi
- Coordinates: 40°54′45″N 47°57′43″E

Architecture
- Established: XV century

Hazra Mausoleum Complex is a complex of historical and architectural monuments built in XV-XVI centuries located in Hazra village of Qabala District, Azerbaijan.

== Description ==
The monument complex is located in the forest and was built in the center of the medieval cemetery with an area of about 3.5 hectares. Although the complex previously included seven mausoleums, four of them have survived and two of them are in poor condition.

All the mausoleums were built in the style of Shirvan-Absheron architectural school. Inscriptions are engraved on the portals and the headstones. The four surviving tombs belong to Sheikh Badraddin, Sheikh Mansur, Sheikh Muhammad and Sheikh Bani. The inscriptions of two of the tombs show that they were built during the reign of Tahmasp I.

The tombs included in the complex differ from each other by the frames of the entrance parts, variations of the ledges and the solution of the internal volume. Along with the patterns on the chests and headstones, the engravers and calligraphers used the features of the Arabic alphabet and used book motifs in the form of carpets to decorate the monuments.

== Mausoleums ==
Sheikh Badraddin Mausoleum

There are two inscriptions on the tomb. It is written in the first inscription that the mausoleum belongs to the son of Sheikh-Rabbani Sheikh Badraddin Sheikh Shamsaddin, and Sheikh died in 850 AH (1446-1447 AD). The plan of Sheikh Badraddin Mausoleum is octagonal inside and out.

Sheikh Muhammad Mausoleum

During the restoration work on the tomb of Sheikh Muhammad, his inscription was found and rebuilt on the wall.

Sheikh Mansur Mausoleum

Sheikh Mansur's tomb is rectangular on the inside and octagonal on the outside. According to the inscription, the village has been known by the name of Sheikh Mansur since the 13th century.

Sheikh Bani Mausoleum

At the time of the early excavations, the date of construction of the tomb was unknown, and due to its dilapidated condition, it did not attract much attention. Later, the reading of the tomb inscription helped to determine the exact date of its construction. The name of the architect is written in the inscription on the left side of the entrance to the tomb: "The work of Ustad Shamakhili Shamsaddin". The stela erected near the tomb records the year 978 AH (1570-1572 AD) and the names of Sheikh Bani and Shah Tahmasib. It is possible that the stella was first located at the entrance to the tomb and then fell from there.

== Restoration ==
The first restoration work in the complex was carried out in 2006 at the request of the local department of the Ministry of Culture and Tourism. The restoration work was carried out by the brigade of Sheki Scientific Restoration Production Department No. 4 of the Ministry of Culture and Tourism. However, a report published in 2018 states that the monuments included in the Hazra mausoleum complex are in a dilapidated condition and on the verge of collapse.

== Gallery ==
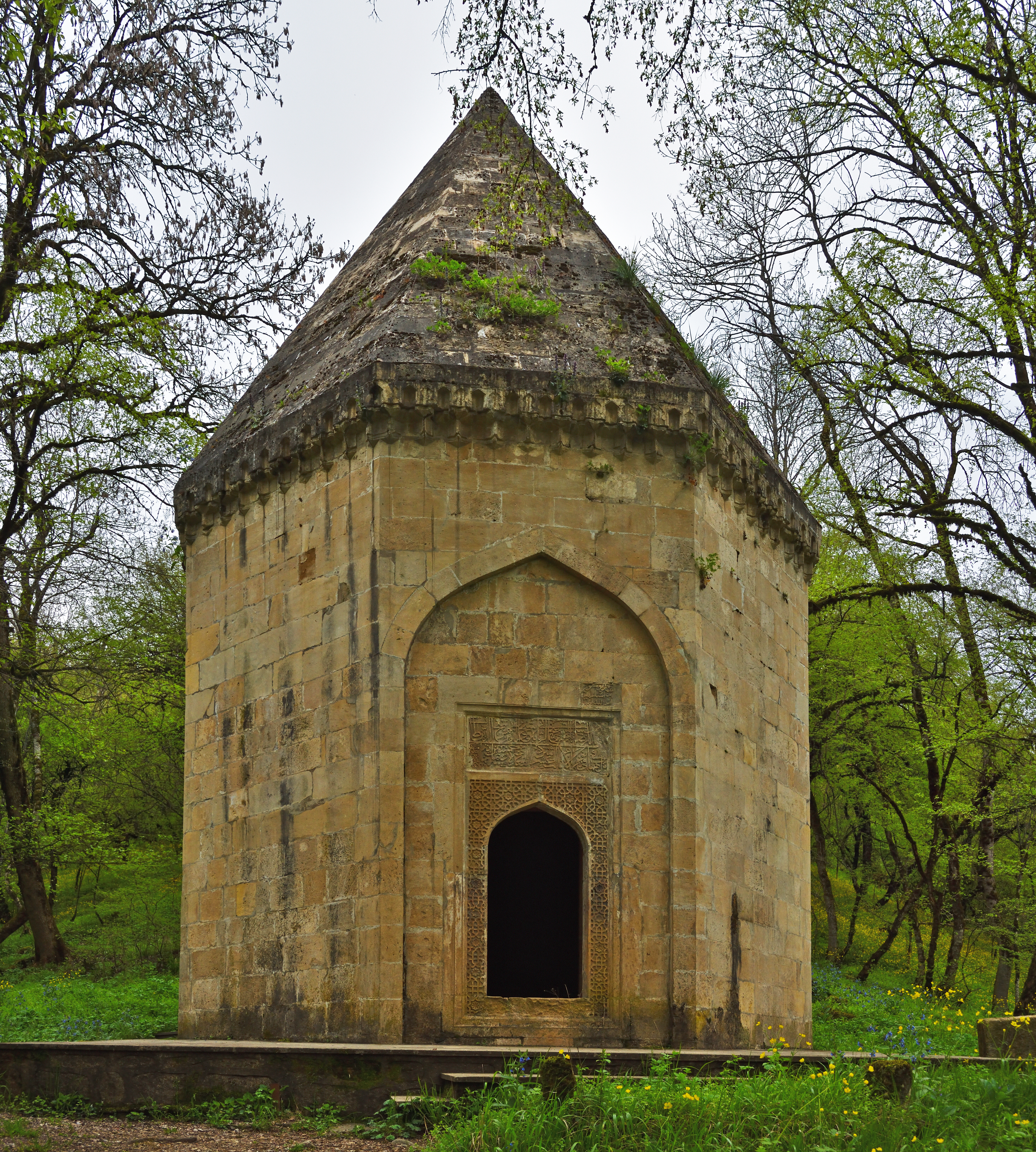
Sheikh Badraddin Mausoleum

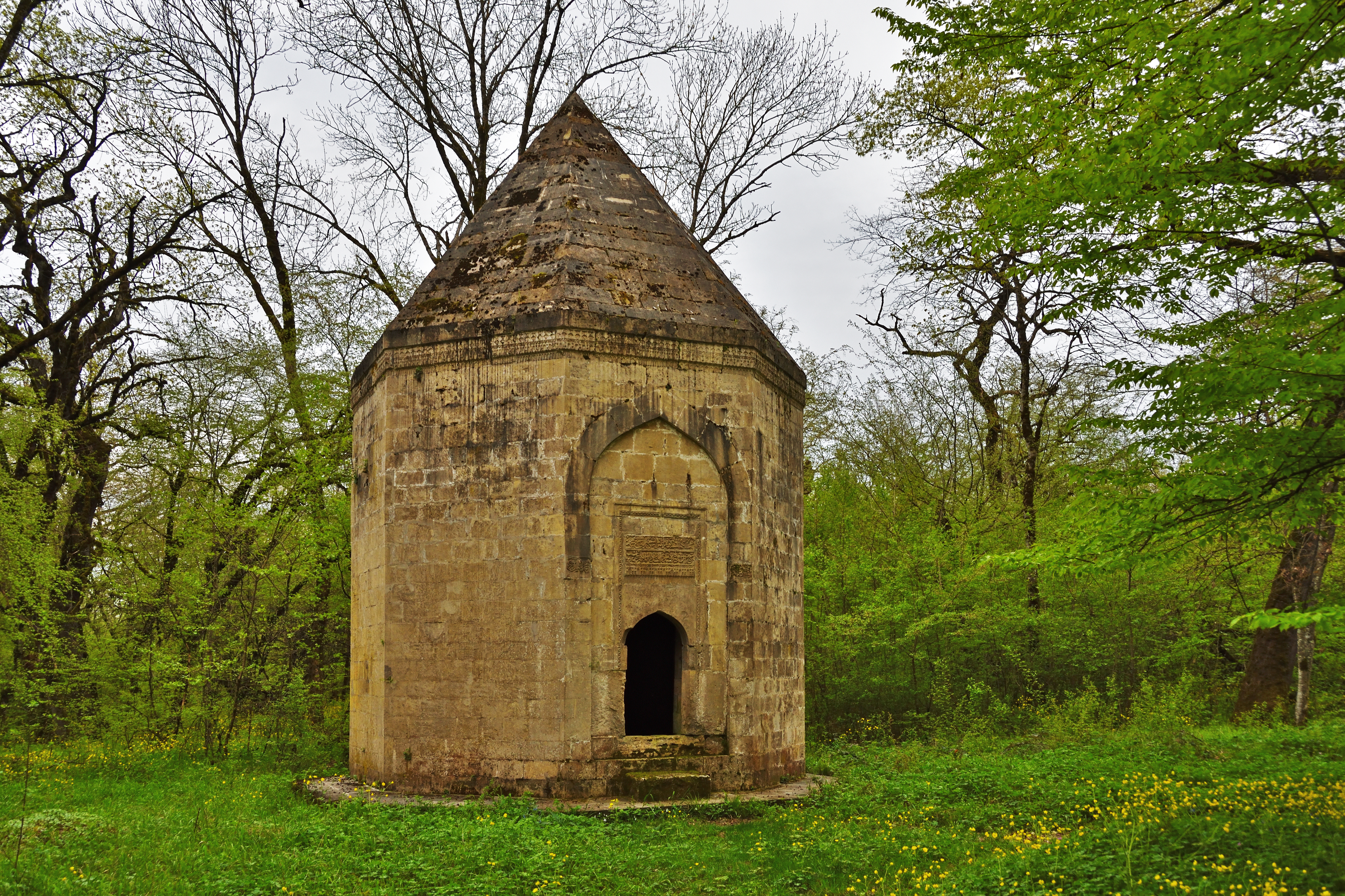
Sheikh Muhammad Mausoleum

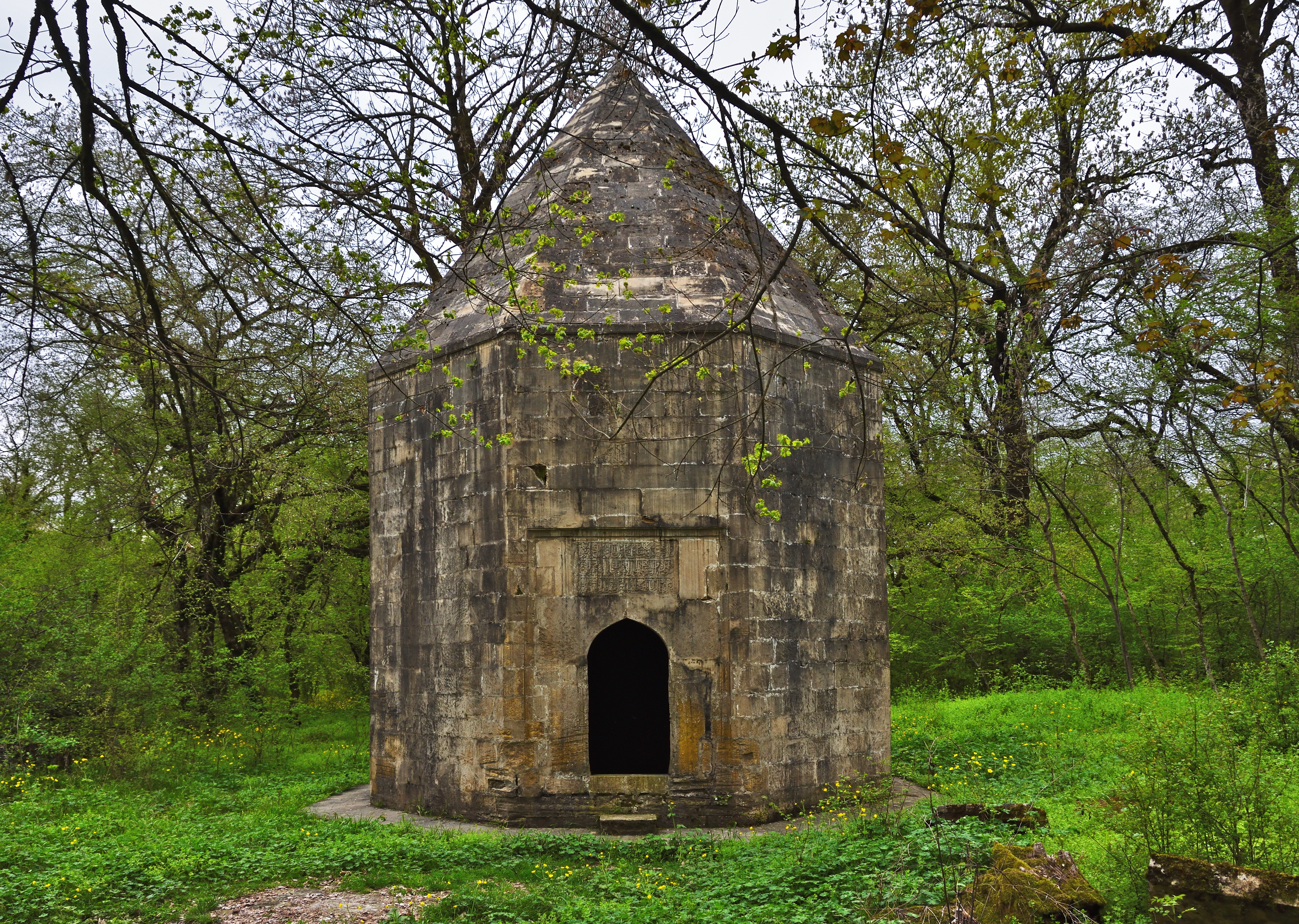
Sheikh Mansur Mausoleum

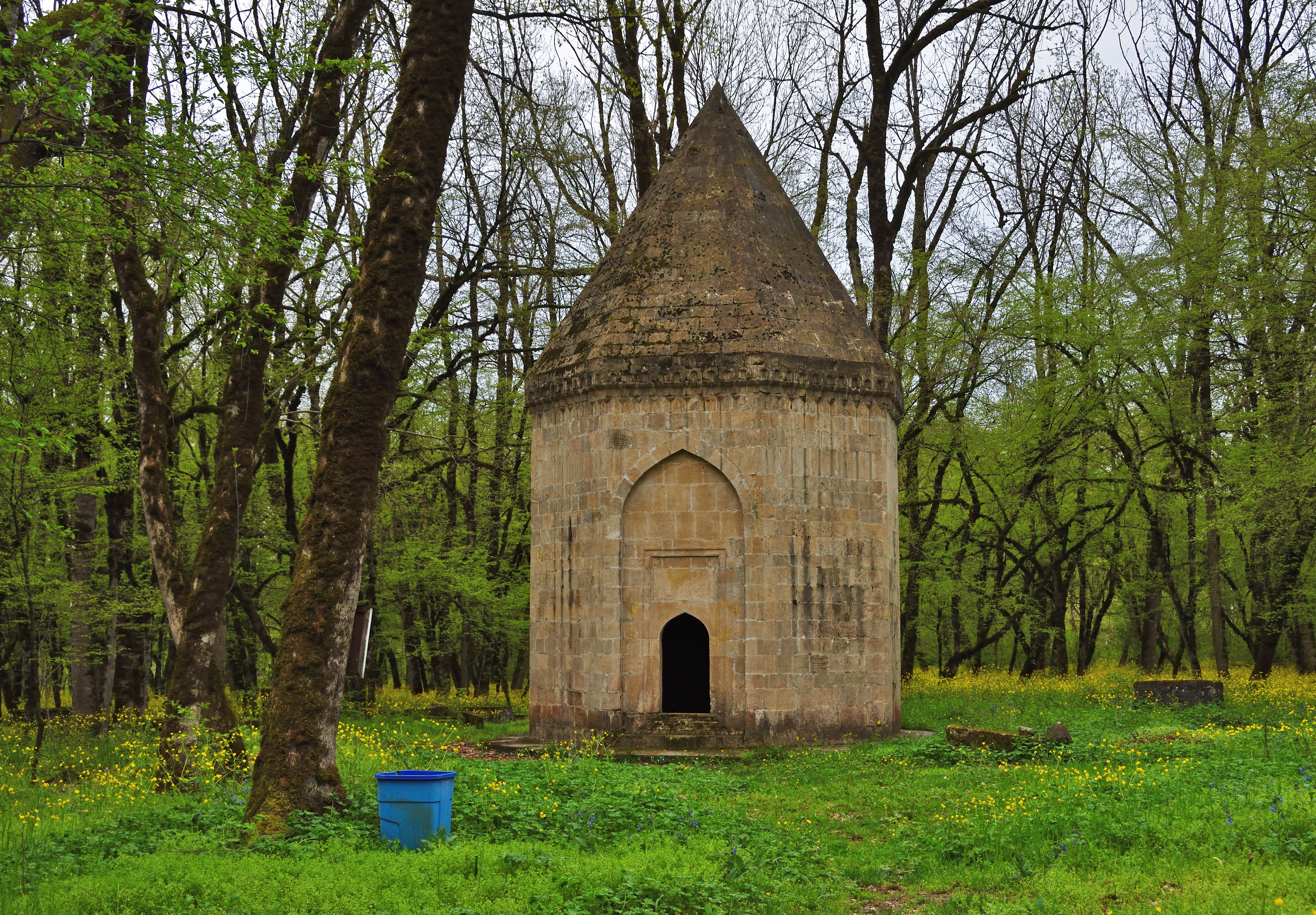
Sheikh Bani Mausoleum

== Literature ==
- Саламзаде, А. В. (1952). Архитектура мавзолеев XII-XV вв. Баку: Архитектура Азербайджана (очерки).
- Саламзаде, А. В. (1964). Архитектура Азербайдана XVI-XIX вв. Баку: Издательство Академии наук Азербайджанской ССР.
