= Hazar =

Hazar may refer to:

== People ==
- Hazar (name), including a list of people with the name

== Places ==
- Hazar, town in Turkmenistan
- Hazaran, or Hazar, a mountain in Iran
- Hesaruiyeh, or Hazar, Iran
- Lake Hazar, Turkey

== See also ==
- Hezar (disambiguation)
- Hazara (disambiguation)
- Hazare, a surname
- Khazars, a nomadic Turkic people
