= Bourj Hammoud massacre =

Armed robbery in Lebanon

The Bourj Hammoud massacre was an armed robbery that took place in a jewelry shop in the Bourj Hammoud quarter, Lebanon, in 1985. Five people have died as a result; the three perpetrators were arrested by the Lebanese Internal Security Forces and sentenced to death but escaped from prison before they could face execution, and have vanished without trace. They have been spotted 3 decades later, in Vienna capital of Austria, by the families of the victims.

== The Massacre ==
On 28 March 1985, an armed robbery took place in the "Middle East Diamond Company" head office located in the Bourj Hammoud quarter of the Lebanese capital Beirut. The criminals gunned down five people present in the shop and stole jewelry to an estimated value of 20 million Lebanese pounds. The victims were the main share holder and chief manager of "Middle East Diamond Company" Hrant Kurkdjian (60 years old, known among jewelers as "Loulou Hrant"), and his four workers, Hani Zammar (28), Maria Hanna Mikhayel (32), Khatoun Tekeyan (27) and Avedik Boyadjian (60).

== Perpetrators ==
Fifteen days after the crime took place, the police arrested two people: Raffi Assadour Nahabedian (25) and Panos Assadour Nahabadian (27). The stolen goods were found hidden in Raffi Assadour Nahabedian's apartment: 3172 grams of 18-carat gold, 495 grams of diamonds (2400 carats), 3244 US dollars and gemstones worth 700 000 US dollars. The two men were interrogated by Mount Lebanon public prosecutor M. Maurice Khawam and confessed to their crime. They had bagged the jewels in preparation for quitting Lebanon for Europe. On 17 April, the third perpetrator, Hratch Assadour Nahabedian, was arrested by Interpol at Larnaca airport in Cyprus as he was preparing to flee to Europe himself. He had a number of stolen diamonds on his person. He was extradited to Lebanon.

== Investigation ==
The three perpetrators of the robbery were brothers. They used to work with the jewelry shop owner, Hrant Kurkdjian, making jewelry to order in their own shop. The stolen goods found during the investigation in Raffi Nahabedian's apartment, as well as neighbours’ testimony, proved that Panos, Raffi and Hratch Nahabedian had planned the attack with robbery in mind. They entered the jewelry shop through an electric gate. They were known to the owner and the four other victims. The three brothers admitted to having killed everyone present in the jewelry shop so as to obliterate any evidence or testimony against them. They did not wish to leave behind any witnesses who might have recognized them. Hratch Nahabedian personally admitted to firing at the five people with a silenced revolver. In the end of April 1985, the case was transferred to the Lebanese Military Court, one of the murderers being a soldier in the Lebanese Armed Forces.

=== Raphael Boghossian Indictment ===
Later the 3 Nahabedian brothers accused the partner of Kurkdjian, the famous businessman named Raphael Boghossian (1925-2012), of conspiring to push them to rob and kill his own partner. Raphael Boghossian who is the father of Albert and Jean Boghossian owners of Villa Empain in Brussels, father in law of the ex-Lebanese Minister of Culture Ghassan Salamé, and grandfather of the famous French television presenter Léa Salamé, was arrested on the 5th of August 1985 and jailed. The criminals managed to record some of his words, which they used later to extort money from him. Raphael Boghossian spent 40 days in prison. He was defended by the prominent Lebanese lawyer Nasri Maalouf and was released after paying a Bail of 3 million Lebanese pounds. This amount was considered the highest Bail ever paid in Lebanese history.

=== Escape ===
In 1988, before the three brothers could be sentenced, Panos, Raffi and Hratch Nahabedian contrived under mysterious circumstances to escape the prison of Roumieh, where they had been detained by the police since 1985.

=== Sentence ===
On 10 December 1994, after 9 years of trial, the Lebanese court sentenced Panos, Raffi and Hratch Nahabedain in absentia to death, commuted by the law of 84/91 to life imprisonment with hard labour. The Court declared Raphael Boghossian not guilty, the proofs provided by the 3 criminals not being sufficient to condemn him. Later, an international warrant from Interpol, a red notice, was out for their arrest.

== Revelations in 2019 ==
In December 2019, the Spanish daily El Mundo published an investigation revealing the outcome of the case. The three fugitives had rebuilt their lives under false identities in Vienna (Austria) where they ran a jewelry shop named Mazbani, in Führichgasse street and obtained Austrian nationality. The shop deals with famous clients like Albert II, Prince of Monaco, Beyoncé, Melanie Griffith, Ekaterina, wife of the billionaire Michael Mucha, German model Angelina Kirsch, Austrian violinist Lidia Baich, Somali writer Waris Dirie, Georgian dancer Katevan Papava and a good part of the cast of the Vienna State Ballet and Vienna State Opera. Raffi, who died on December 12, 2012, is buried in a Viennese cemetery under the name of Haroutyoun Dayan. It appears that the Viennese police had known the true identity of at least one of the three brothers since 2016 but had not acted on it, due to the lack of extradition agreements between Austria and Lebanon. In 2020, the Austrian weekly magazine Profil, interviewed one of the brothers, who agreed being present in the jewelry store on the day of the crime, but denied being the murderer of the 5 persons. The victim's families continue the legal proceedings against the two brothers. They have reported having received threats, they started also a petition addressed to the Austrian minister of Interior Mag. Gerhard Karner and of Justice Dr. Alma Zadić. The Austrian Falter newspaper and ABC Australia published in May and July 2022, articles, revealing that the Austrian citizenship of Panos Nahabedian, known in Austria by the name of George Mazbanian, was already canceled: Panos was stripped of his citizenship because of false declarations and his entry into the territory with a woman's passport. In 2024, the German Die Zeit newspaper and Stern (magazine) published articles where they mentioned that Hratch Nahabedian, known in Austria by the name of Hamayak Sermakanian, was also stripped of his Austrian citizenship.
