= Hazar (name) =

- Gender: unisex

Origin
- Meaning: A Turkic tribe who lived around the Caspian Sea between the 7th and 11th centuries. see also Khazars

Other names
- Related names: Khazars

Hazar is a unisex Turkish given name, derived from a Turkic tribe's name that lived around the Caspian Sea between the 7th and 11th centuries. It is also a Persian unisex given name. Notable people with the name include:

== Given name ==
- Hazar Khan Bijarani (1946–2018), Pakistani politician
- Hazar Ergüçlü (born 1993), Cypriot-Turkish actress
- Hazar Motan (born 1990), Turkish actress, model, and painter
- Hazar Tabbakh (born 1964), Syrian poet and writer
