= Al-Alam (book) =

1893–1976 book by al-Zirikli

al-Aʻlām
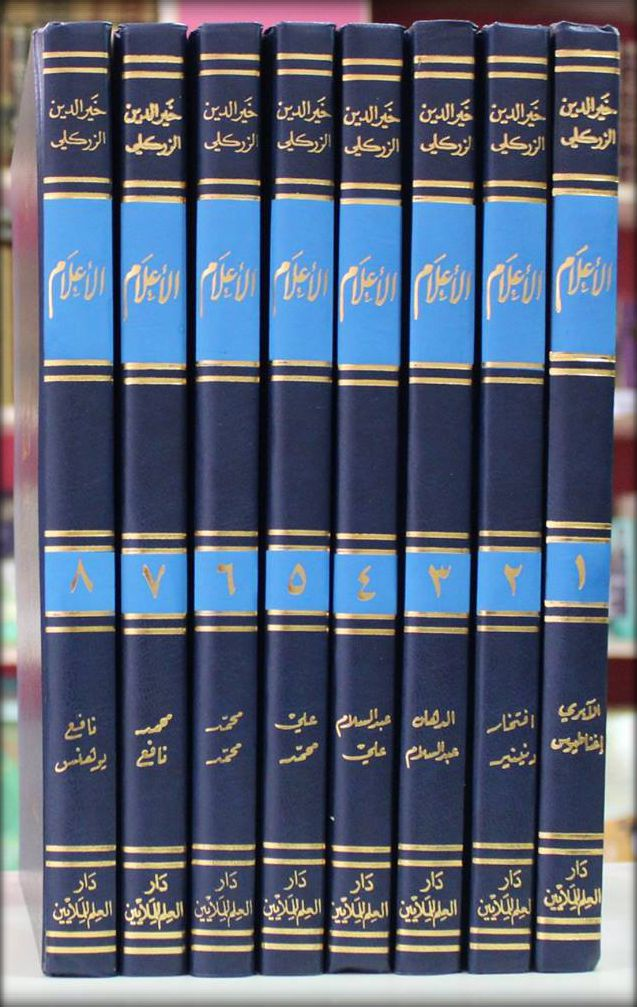
- The work in 8 volumes, as published by Dar al-'Ilm lil-Malayin in 1978–1979
- Author: Khayr al-Din al-Zirikli
- Original title: al-Aʻlām: Qāmūs Tarājim li-Ashhar al-Rijāl wa-al-Nisāʼ min al-ʻArab wa-al-Mustaʻribīn wa-al-Mustashriqīn
- Language: Arabic
- Genre: Biography
- Publication date: First Edition published in 1926–1927
- Publication place: Egypt, Lebanon

al-Aʻlām (Arabic: الأعلام), fully known as al-Aʻlām: Qāmūs Tarājim li-Ashhar al-Rijāl wa-al-Nisāʼ min al-ʻArab wa-al-Mustaʻribīn wa-al-Mustashriqīn (Eminent Personalities: A Biographical Dictionary of Noted Men and Women among the Arabs, the Arabists and the Orientalists) is a biographical work by the Syrian Arab historian, Khayr al-Din al-Zirikli. Written in the Arabic language, the work features biographies for more than a hundred influential people of Arabia, both historic and modern.

== Summary ==
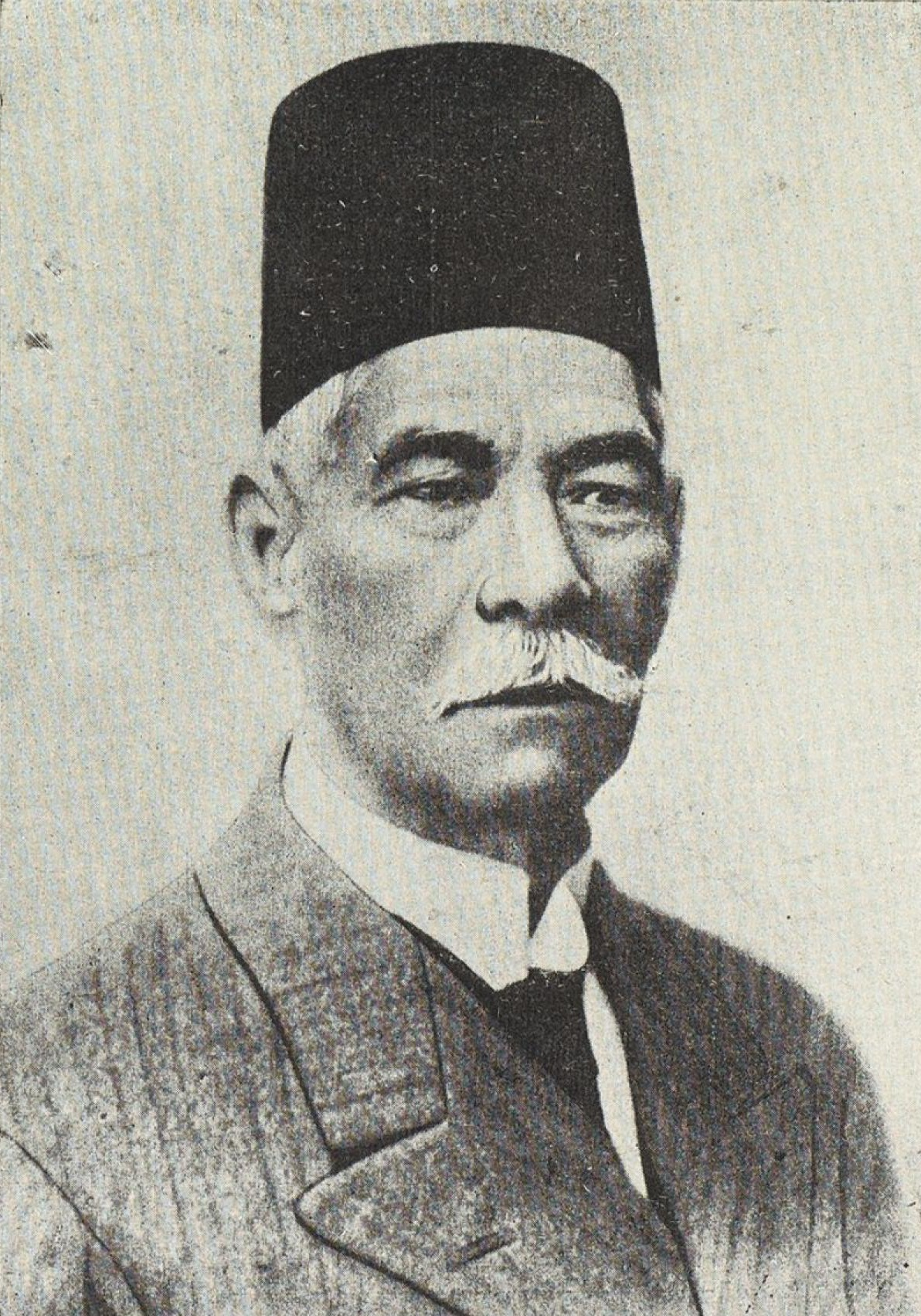
A portrait of Saad Zaghloul, taken from his biography in al-A'lam

al-A'lam is a compilation of biographies of the prominent figures in the Arabian Peninsula from pre-Islamic ancient times until contemporary times (the 19th–20th centuries). The placement of each biography is by alphabetical order and date of death. For example, in the book, the biography of 'Amr ibn 'Abd Allah al-Jumahi (died 625 CE) is directly above that of 'Amr ibn 'Abd Allah (died 745 CE). Among the notable figures mentioned in the book include the pre-Islamic knight Abu Layla al-Muhalhel and the early Muslim revert, Abu Bakr.

== Publication history ==
The first edition of al-A'lam was published in Egypt between 1926 and 1927. The second edition of al-A'lam was then published again in the 1950s, with added portraits and illustrations, as well as being printed in 10 volumes. A revised of al-A'lam was then printed in 8 volumes and published by the Lebanon-based Dar al-'Ilm lil-Malayin publishing house between the years 1978–1979. The same publishing house also would reprint the work in 7 volumes in 2002.

== Commentary ==
Ahmad Alawinah, a Jordanian researcher and historian, wrote a commentary on al-A'lam that was titled Tawshīḥ kitāb al-A‘lām li-Khayr al-Dīn al-Ziriklī. In his commentary, he gives criticism and praise of al-Zirikli's writings and also adds on to missing information in the biographies.

An annotated version of al-A'lam was later written by the academic Muhammad ibn Abdullah al-Rashid and published in Jordan in the year 2014.

== Gallery ==
Below is a gallery of portraits and illustrations of individuals that were featured in al-A'lam.

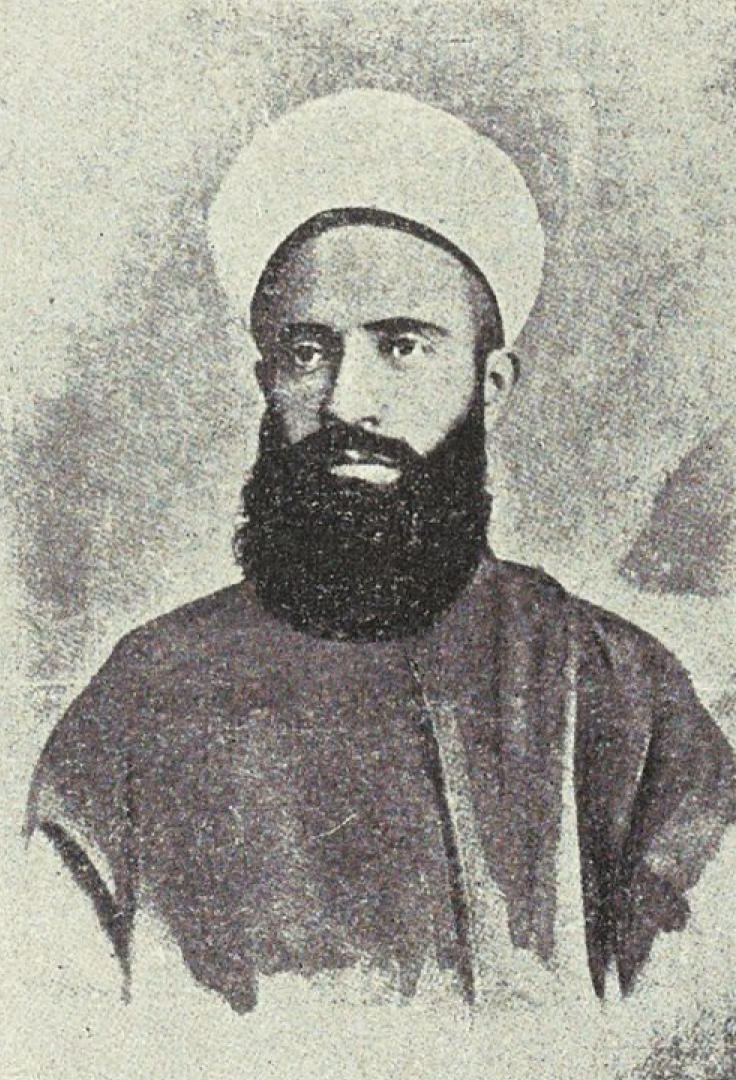
Jamal al-Din al-Qasimi, a Muslim scholar and pioneer of Salafism

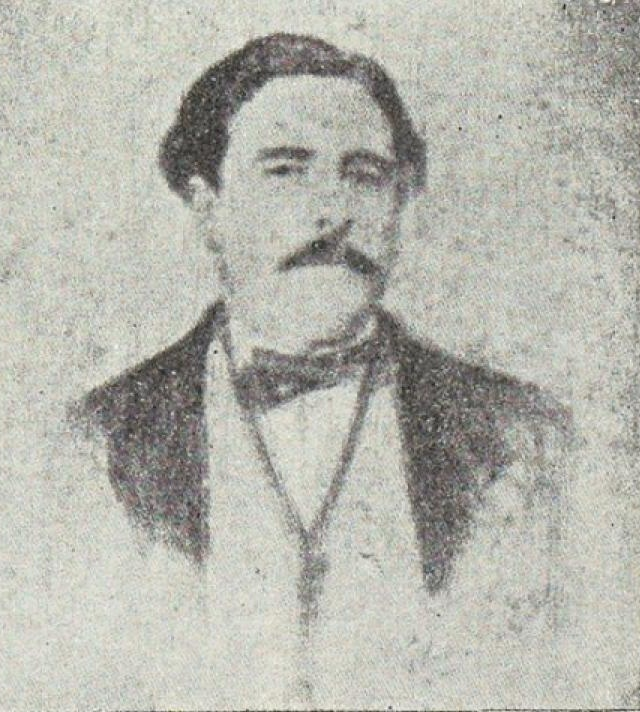
Jibra'il Dallal, a Syrian author and poet

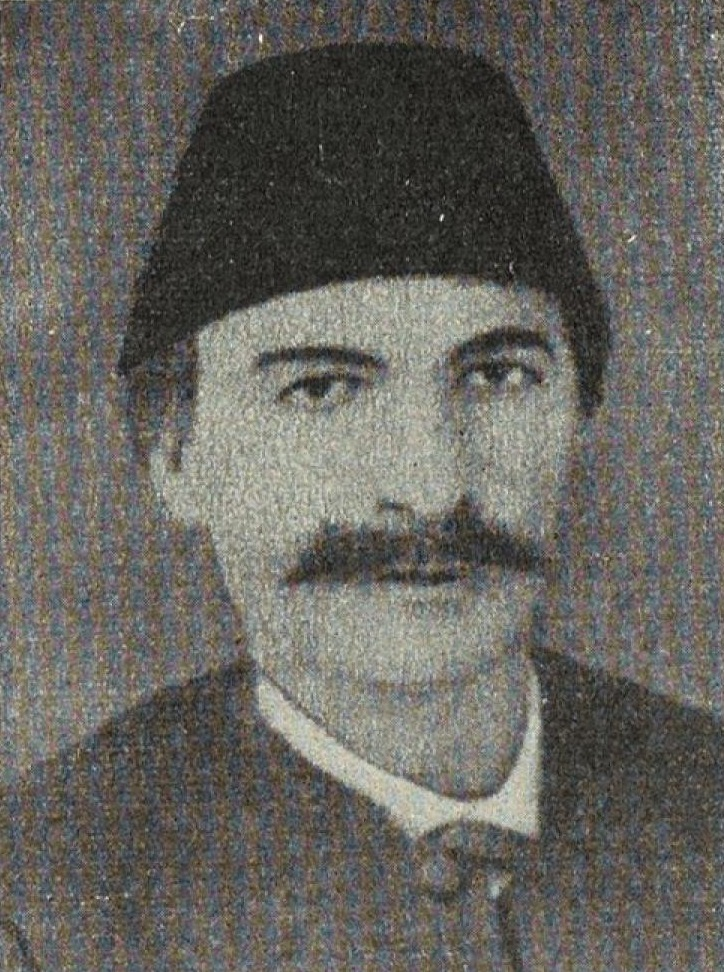
Khalil al-Khuri, the owner of Hadiqat al-Akhbar

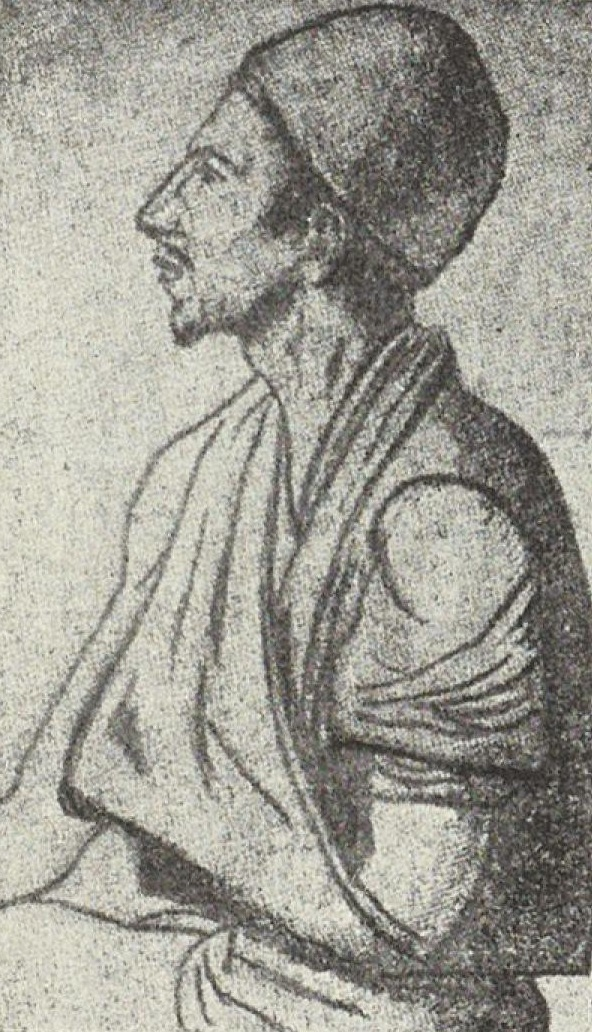
Suleiman al-Halabi, the man who assassinated Jean-Baptiste Kléber

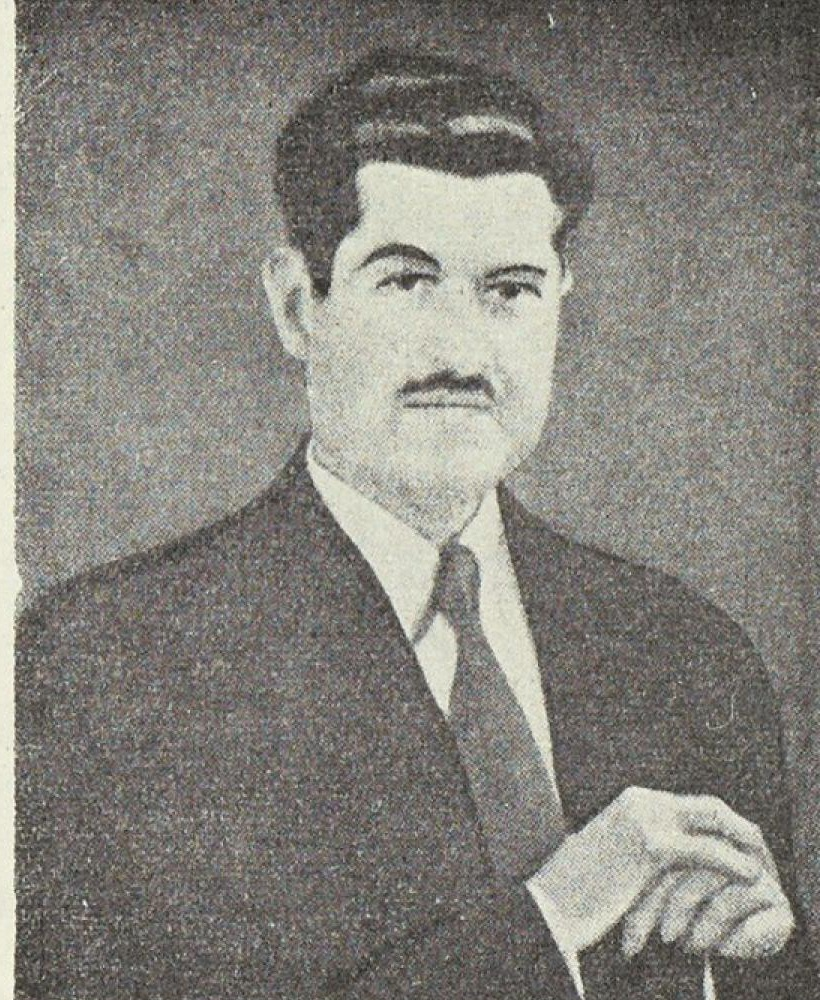
Saddam Hussein

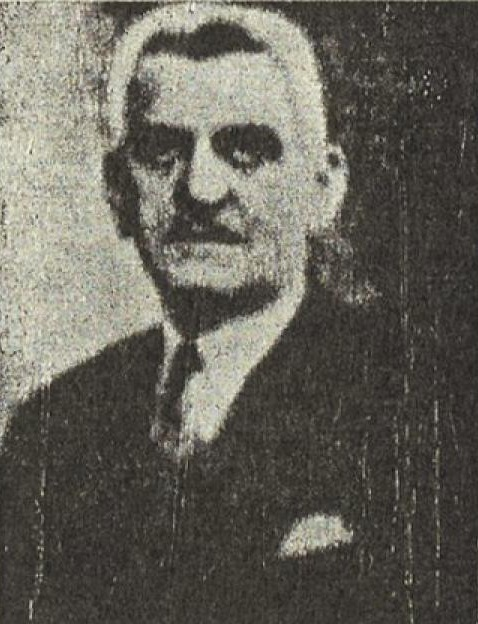
Hamdi al-Pachachi, the Prime Minister of Iraq (r. 1944–1946)

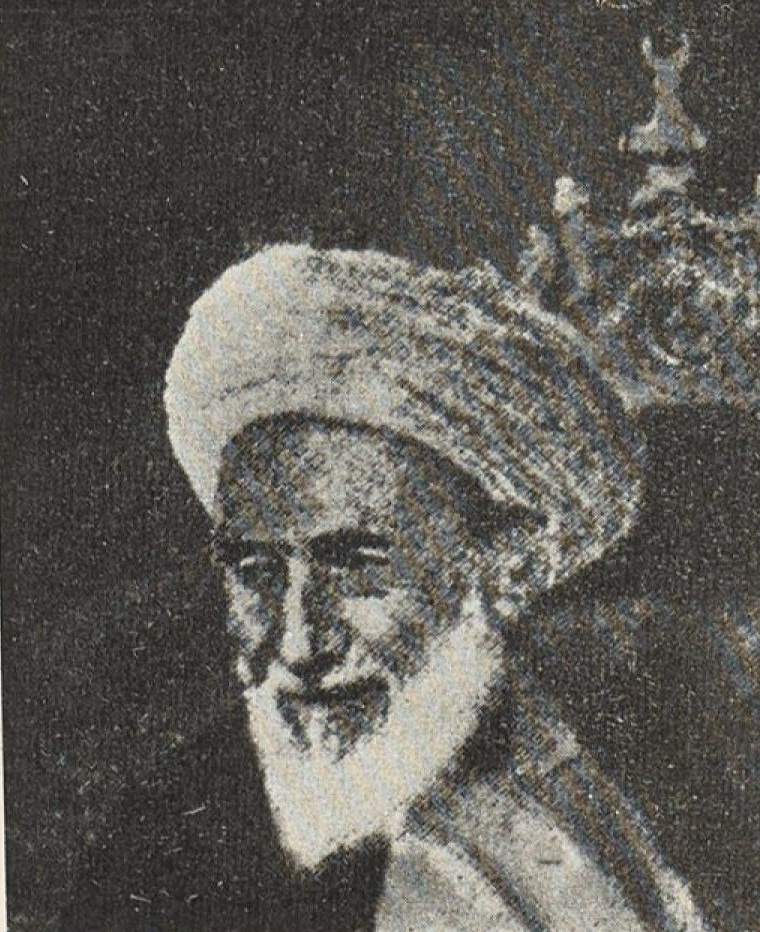
Salim al-Bishri, former Imam of Al-Azhar and a Maliki Sunni scholar

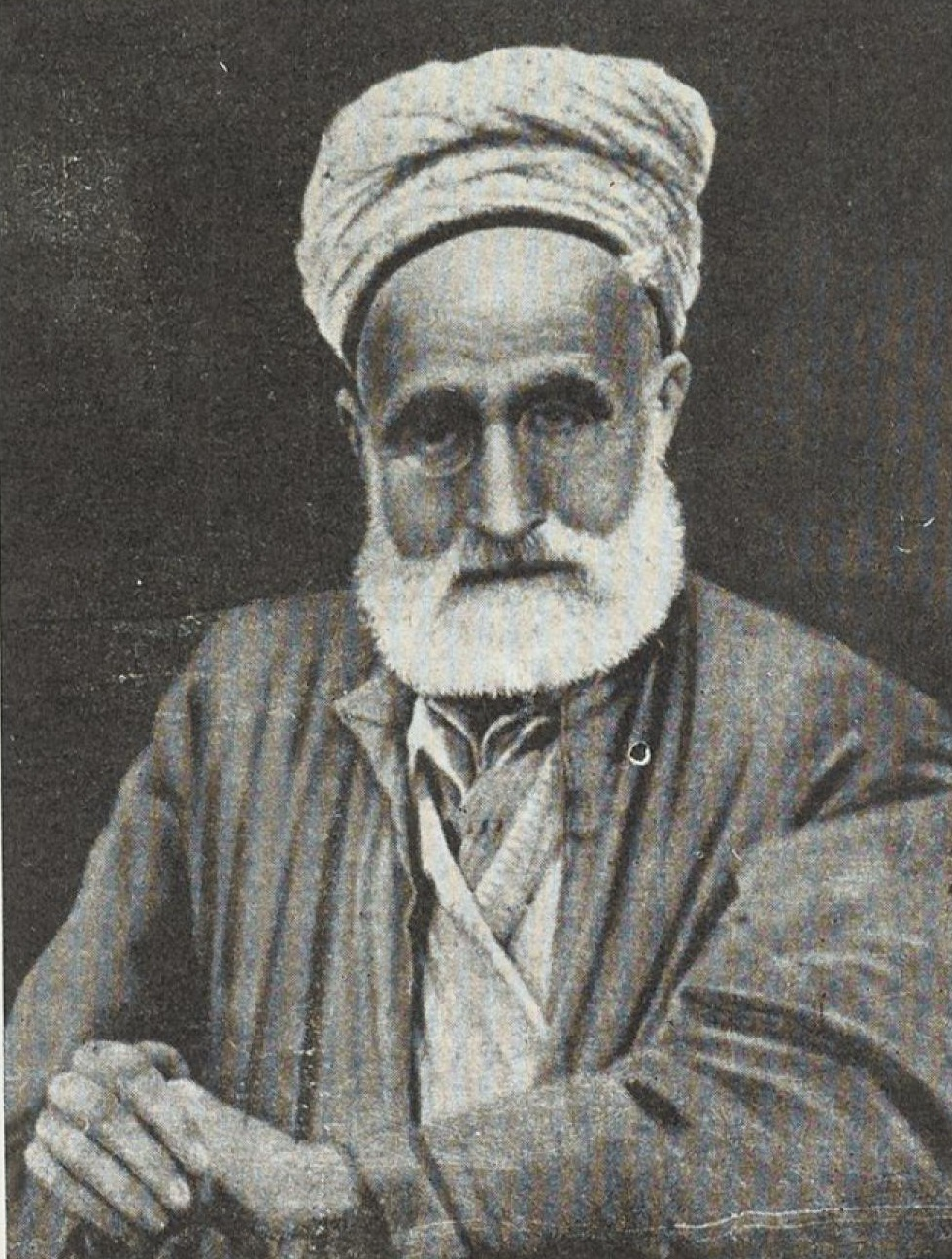
Syrian Salafi scholar, Tahir al-Jazairi
