= Jibra'il Dallal =

Syrian poet and journalist (1836–1899)

- جبرائيل الدلال
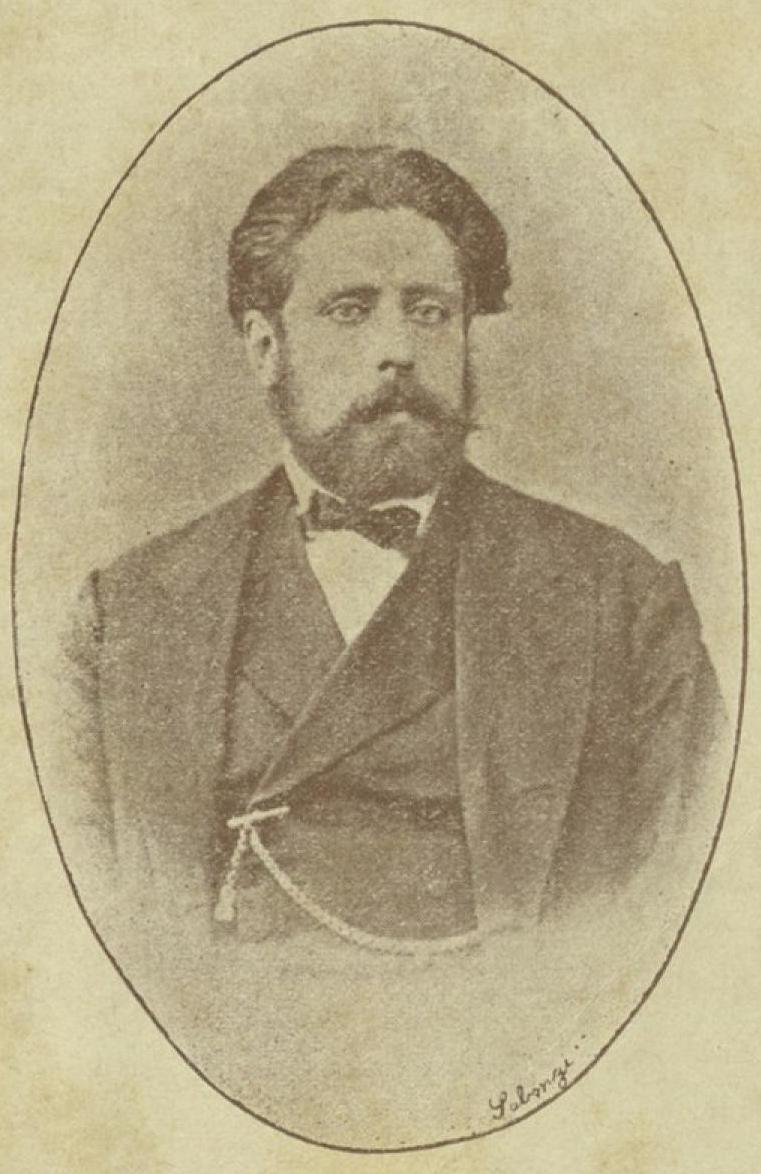
- Portrait of Dallal
- Born: Jibra'il bin 'Abd Allah bin Nasr Allah al-Dallal; 2 April 1836; Aleppo Eyalet, Ottoman Syria
- Died: 24 December 1892 (56 years old); Aleppo vilayet, Ottoman Syria
- Criminal charges: Accused of rebelling against the government
- Criminal penalty: Imprisonment
- Relatives: Qustaki al-Himsi (nephew)

Jibra'il bin 'Abd Allah bin Nasr Allah al-Dallal (Arabic: جبرائيل بن عبد الله بن نصر الله الدلال / ALA-LC: Jibrāʼīl bin ʻAbd Allāh bin Naṣr Allāh al-Dallāl; 2 April 1836 – 24 December 1892), also known as Gabriel Dallal, was a Syrian journalist and poet. Born in Aleppo, he was fluent in not only Arabic, but also in the French and Italian languages.

== Life ==
Jibra'il Dallal was born in Aleppo. He was mainly brought up by his older sister as his father had died when he was still young. Dallal studied in Aleppo and would later travel to Europe to master the French and Italian languages. He also worked in administrative roles for the French government and the Ottoman Empire. Dallal later became a teacher at the University of Vienna, teaching classes on Arabic for two years. Aside from his scholarly career in Arabic literature, Dallal was also a Hafiz, who memorized a portion of the Qur'an.

=== Imprisonment and death ===
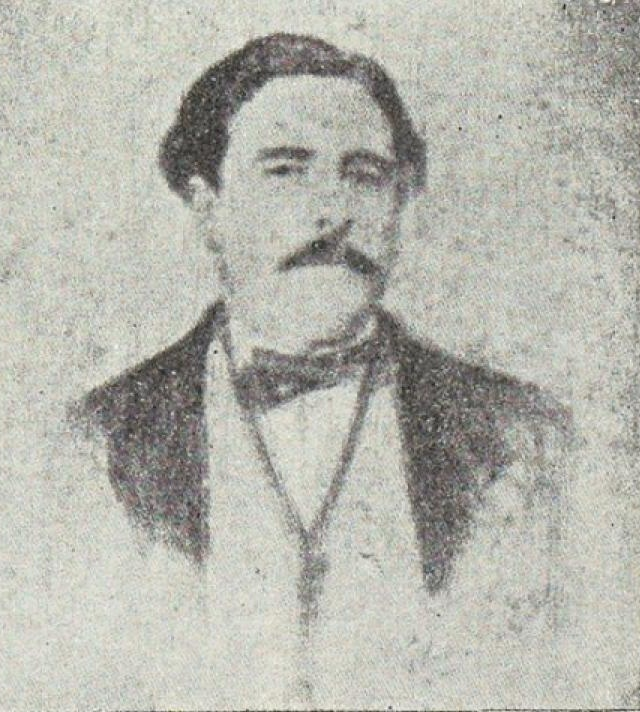
A portrait of Dallal in old age, featured in the second version of Al-Aʻlām

Dallal returned to his homeland in 1884, where he resumed his job as a teacher until the Ottoman government accused him of inciting rebellion due to the publication of his controversial poem on freedom, Al-ʻArsh wa-al-Haykal, afterwards he was stripped off all his governmental positions and jobs. In 1890, an order was given to arrest him and he faced imprisonment in Aleppo until his death. He died on 24 December 1892.

== Works ==
Dallal's works include:

- Al-Siḥr al-Ḥalāl fī Shiʻr al-Dallāl; a collection of Dallal's poetry. It was first published in 1903 by his nephew, Qustaki al-Himsi.
- Al-ʻArsh wa-al-Haykal; a poem he composed, which landed him in prison. This poem was published in Atta Pasha al-Husayni's book, Al-Khawatir fi al-Islam.

== See also ==
- List of Arabic-language poets
- List of people from Aleppo
