= Hazara, Punjab =

Hazara
- Village
- Location in Punjab, India Hazara (India)
- Coordinates: 31.3553569°N 75.636033°E
- Country: India
- State: Punjab
- District: Jalandhar

Government
  - Type: Panchayat raj
  - Body: Gram panchayat
- Elevation: 240 m (790 ft)

Languages
  - Official: Punjabi
- Time zone: UTC+5:30 (IST)
- Telephone: 144025
- ISO 3166 code: IN-PB
- Website: jalandhar.nic.in

Hazara is a village in the Jalandhar district of Punjab State, India. It is located 11 kilometres (6.8 mi) from district headquarter Jalandhar and 149 kilometres (93 mi) from state capital Chandigarh. The village is administrated by a sarpanch who is an elected representative of village as per Panchayati raj (India). The village was founded by Guru Tegh Bahadur in the 1600s.

Chander Sain is located nearby.

== See also ==
- List of villages in India
