= Khayr al-Din al-Zirikli =

Syrian journalist, writer and historian (1893–1976)

- خير الدين الزركلي
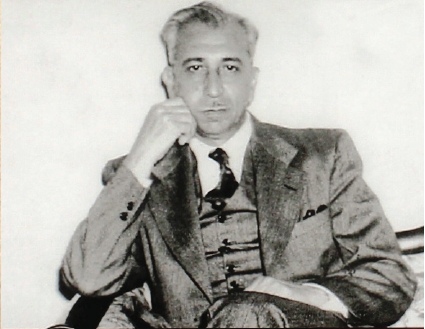

Ambassador of Saudi Arabia to Egypt
- In office 1934–1946
- Succeeded by: Sheikh Muhammad Al Ireza

Ambassador of Saudi Arabia to Morocco
- In office 1957–1963
- Succeeded by: Jawad Mustafa Zikri

Personal details
- Born: June 25, 1893 Beirut
- Died: November 25, 1976 (aged 83)
- Education: Privately educated, studied literature.
- Profession: Professor of Arab studies

Khayr al-Dīn al-Ziriklī (Arabic: خير الدين الزركلي; June 25, 1893 – November 25, 1976) was a Syrian nationalist and poet in opposition to the French Mandate for Syria and the Lebanon, historian, Syrian citizen and a diplomat in the service of Saudi Arabia. He is most well-known for The Personages, a large biographical compendium of the Arab World.

== Career ==
Khayr al-Dīn al-Ziriklī grew up in Damascus.

After the dissolution of the Ottoman Empire as a result of the First World War, Zirikli published a daily newspaper in Damascus called Lisān al-ʻArab (Arabic: The Tongue of the Arabs) which has been closed. Then he participated in the publication of the daily Al-Mufīd and wrote literary and social articles. After the Battle of Maysalun on 23 July 1920 and the French invasion of Damascus, he was sentenced to death in absentia and the seizure of his property by the French authorities. He escaped from Damascus to the Mandatory Palestine and made a pilgrimage to the Kingdom of Hejaz.

In 1921, Zirikli became a subject of the Kingdom of Hejaz and Hussein bin Ali, Sharif of Mecca made him adviser to his son Abdullah I of Jordan on the establishment of the first government in Amman, where he was appointed inspector general of the Ministry of Education.

The French government overturned Zirikli's death sentence and he returned to Damascus.

In 1925, Zirikli founded the Arabic printing works in Cairo, where he printed a number of own books and by other authors. In Jerusalem, he was with two other persons editor of the newspaper Al-Hayat which was closed by the British Mandatory Palestine administration. From 1925 to 1927 during the Great Syrian Revolt he wrote in Syrian and Egyptian newspapers against the French Mandate for Syria and the Lebanon. The Mandate authorities again condemned him to death and demanded that Fuad I of Egypt silence Kheraddin Al-Zerakly or expel him from Egypt. Zirikli founded another daily newspaper in Jaffa. In 1930 he was elected member of the Arab Academy of Damascus.

In 1934, Ibn Saud appointed Zirikli agent later envoy of Saudi Arabia in Cairo. He represented Ibn Saud in the discussions on the founding of the Arab League and signed the founding agreement. In 1946, Ibn Saud appointed Zirikli as Foreign Minister in his throne council, in agreement with Yusuf Yasin and the Arab League, and he became member of the Academy of the Arabic Language in Cairo. In 1951, Ibn Saud appointed him minister plenipotentiary to the Arab League in Cairo. From 1957 to 1963 Zirikli was the ambassador of Saudi Arabia to Morocco. In 1960 he was elected a member of the Iraqi Academy of Sciences.

== International Conferences ==
- From 25 to 27 September 1946 Zirikli participated in the first meeting of the World Medical Association in London.
- From 16 to 21 September 1947 he participated on the Conference of World Medical Association in Paris.
- In 1947 attended the session of the United Nations General Assembly in Lake Success
- In 1954 he was Ministre plénipotentiaire in Athens.
- In 1955 he was sent to Tunisia and participated in a conference organized by the Constitutional Party.

== Works ==
- Dīwān ديوان.
- Al-Aʻlām: Qāmūs Tarājim li-Ashhar al-Rijāl wa-al-Nisāʼ min al-ʻArab wa-al-Mustaʻribīn wa-al-Mustashriqīn
