= Jacobo Harrotian =

Armenian-Mexican general (1862–1935)

Jacobo Harrotian General de División del Ejército Mexicano
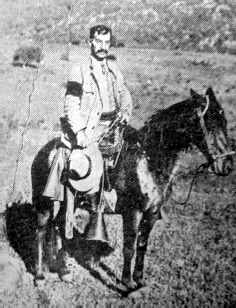
- Harrotian on horseback in Tejalpa, Morelos, 1911
- Born: 1862; Aleppo, Ottoman Syria
- Died: 1935 (aged 72–73); San Cristóbal, Dominican Republic
- Occupations: Military officer; physician; miner
- Military career
- Allegiance: Mexico
- Branch: Mexican Army
- Service years: 1911-1914
- Rank: Division General
- Battles/wars: Mexican Revolution; Battle of Zacatecas

Jacobo Harrotian (also spelled Harrotián, or Hagop Harootian; Armenian:Յակոբ Յարութիւնեան; 1862 – 1935) was an Armenian-Mexican military officer that participated in the Mexican Revolution. Born in 1862 in Aleppo, he immigrated to Mexico, where he became a prominent miner, entrepreneur, and community benefactor in the state of Guerrero. He later held command during the revolution before going into exile following political persecution.

== Early life ==
Harrotian was born in 1862 to an Armenian family in Aleppo. In 1883, he imigrated to the United States, before moving to Mexico, arriving through the port of Veracruz. He later settle in the state of Guerrero, establishing himself in Zumpango del Río, where he married Benita Sanchez and developed extensive mining interest, including ownership of the La Delfina gold mine. He also operated a local store known as La Armenia, from which he also provided medical services.

== Mexican Revolution ==
Harrotian's military experience in Mexico began before the Revolution in non-combat capacity as a sanitation officer. With the outbreak of the revolution, he transitioned to active revolutionary service. 1911, he aligned with the maderista forces in Guerrero under Juan Andreu Almazán, serving as his second-in-command and chief of staff he participated in the key capture of Iguala in May. They were among the first southern revolutionaries to reach the outskirts of Mexico City to greet Francisco I. Madero upon his triumphant entry. During Madero's presidency he was given the formal rank of colonel and placed in command of the Rurales.

Following Victoriano Huerta's coup and assassination of Madero, Harrotian aligned with new de facto government of Huerta, driven primarily by his long standing personal loyalty to Almazán, who recognized Huerta immediately after the coup. Promoted to general by Huerta, he commanded a legion of approximately 2,000 men and fought in the Battle of Zacatecas against Pancho Villa's forces.

== Exile and later life ==
Shortly after the Battle of Zacatecas and the subsequent fall of Huerta's government, Harrotian and his family faced political persecution due to their Huertista affiliation. His wife Benita, died on their way out of the country. During his exile, Harrotian travelled through Cuba and New Orleans, before settling in the Dominican Republic, where he resumed his mining activities. He died in 1935, in his mining property, in San Cristóbal.

His son, Elías who remained in Mexico, later held local administrative positions in Zumpango del Río

== Legacy ==
Harootian’s most enduring legacy stems from his extensive philanthropic initiatives in Zumpango del Río and the surrounding region of Guerrero, where he used the wealth generated from his mining and commercial enterprises to fund public infrastructure and improve community.

He personally financed and constructed key roads connecting Zumpango del Río to neighboring villages. He established a piped water system drawing from his lands in La Ciénega to supply public fountains, installed an electricity-generating plant, and introduced the first automobile to the area. He offered free medical services to all residents and operated his store La Armenia on fair terms

His former residence, known as the Casa del Armenio, was later repurposed as the municipal town hall and now houses the Jacobo Harootian Cultural Center.
