= Armenia–Mexico relations =

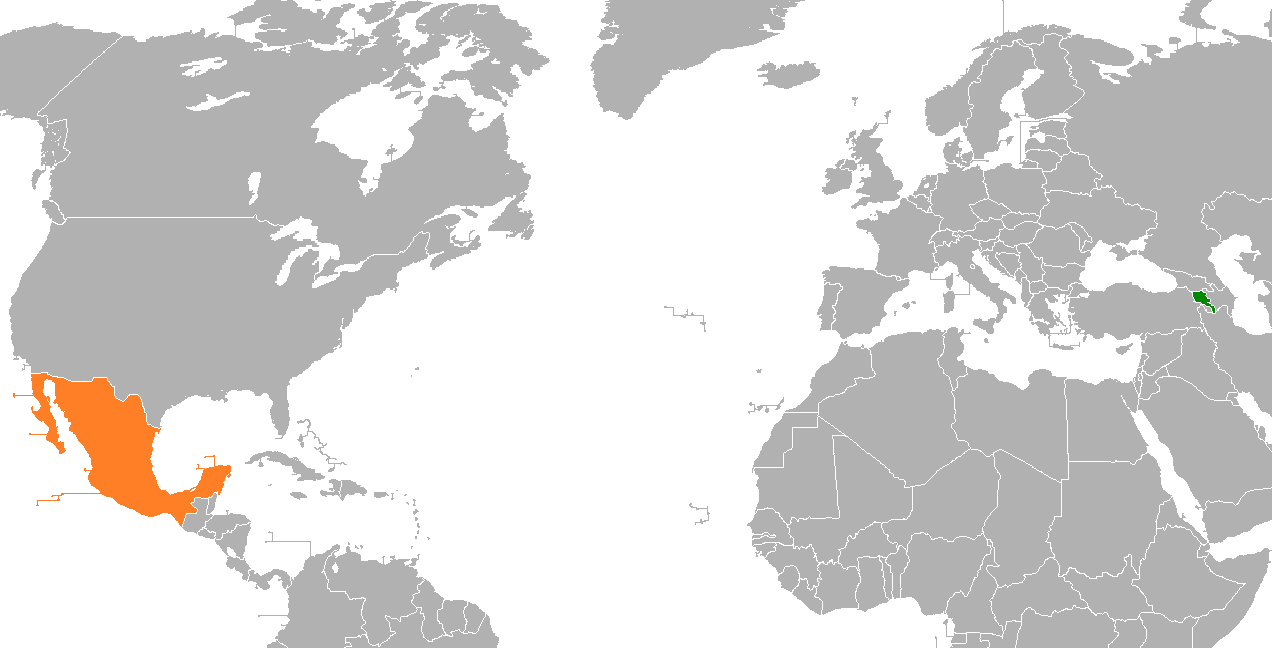

- Armenia: Mexico

The nations of Armenia and Mexico established diplomatic relations in 1992. Both nations are members of the United Nations and the World Trade Organization. Armenia is an observer of the Pacific Alliance.

== History ==
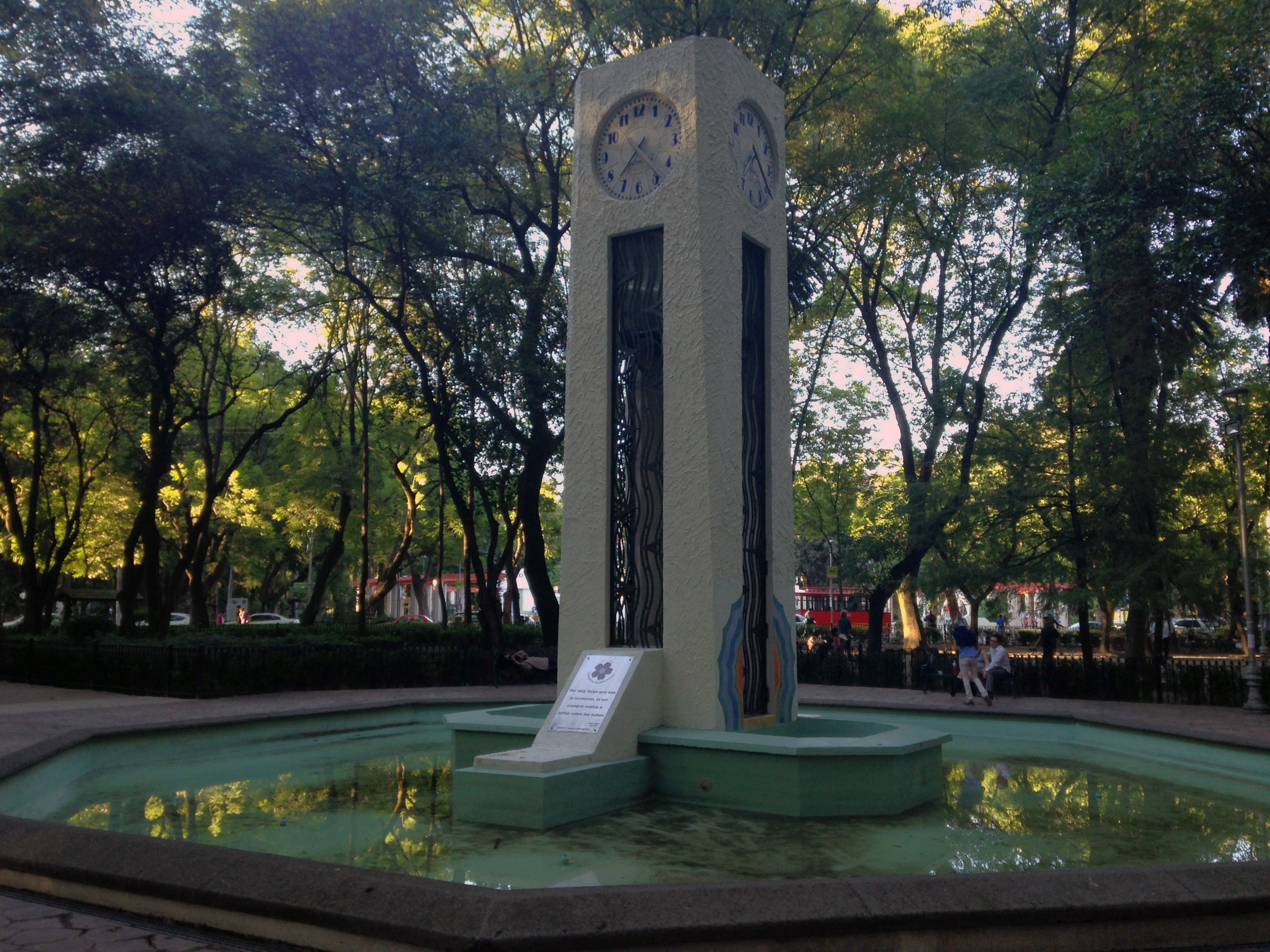
Clock donated by the Armenian community in Mexico and placed in Parque México, Mexico City

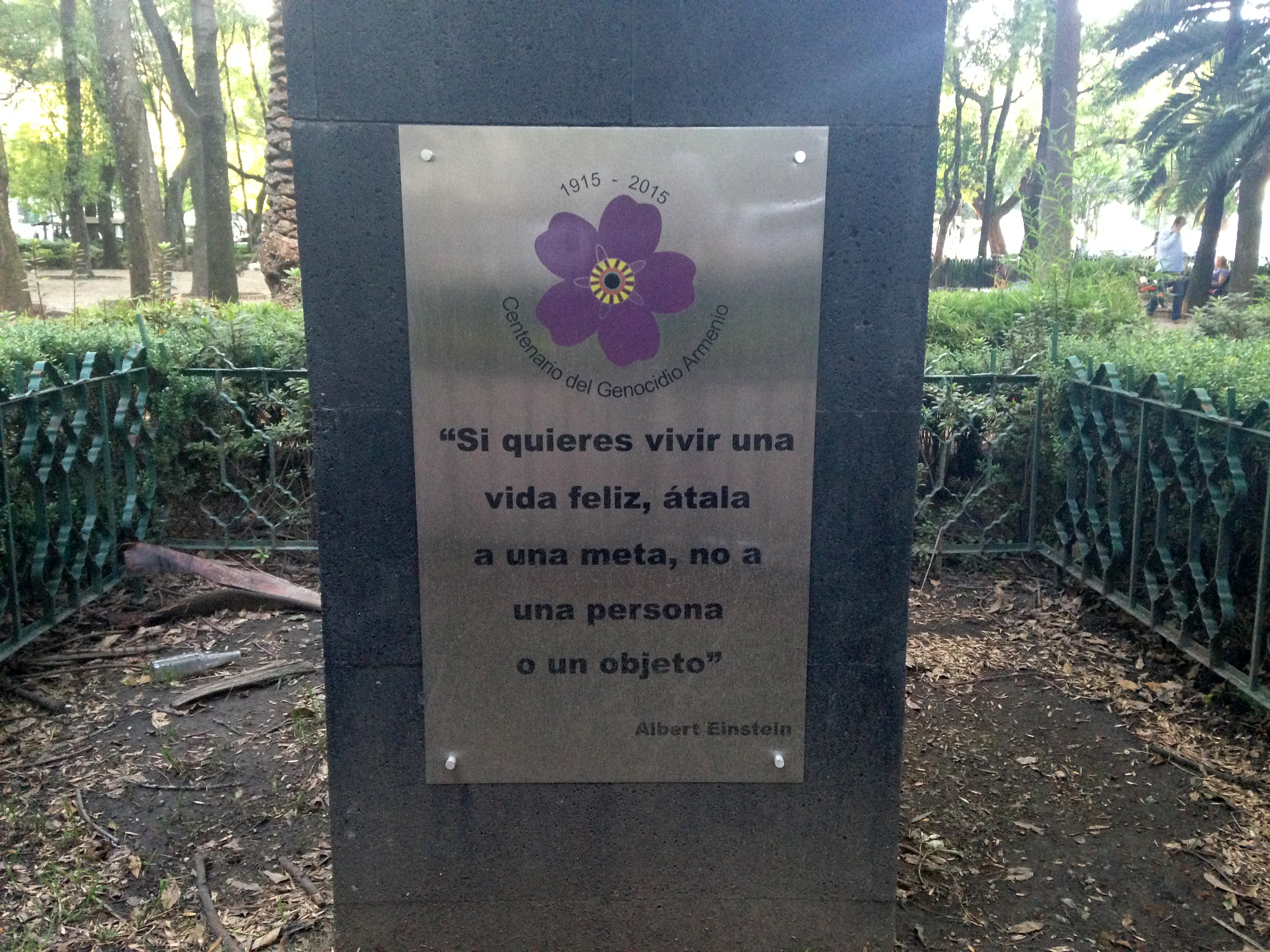
Plaque commemorating the 100th anniversary of the Armenian genocide in Mexico City

The first Armenians to arrive in Mexico occurred in the 17th century, however, the largest wave took place in the 1920s as a result of the Armenian genocide. On 14 January 1992, a month after the dissolution of the Soviet Union in December 1991; Armenia and Mexico established formal diplomatic relations with each other. In March 2002, Armenian Prime Minister Andranik Margaryan came to the northern Mexican city of Monterrey to attend the Monterrey Consensus Conference; this visit becoming the first and highest level Armenian government official to visit Mexico since independence. In August 2002, Armenian foreign minister Vartan Oskanian paid an official visit to Mexico. During his visit, both nations signed agreements on cooperation in the fields of culture and education as well as an agreement to abolish visas for official and diplomatic passport holders.

In October 2012, Armenian foreign minister Eduard Nalbandyan paid and official visit to Mexico. During his visit, foreign minister Nalbandyan expressed his concerns over Mexico's recognition in 2011 of the Khojaly Massacre. Foreign Minister Nalbandyan was also concerned with the placing of a statue commemorating former Azeri President Heydar Aliyev on Mexico's main Paseo de la Reforma. After much opposition from human rights groups for placing the statue of a “dictator” in Mexico, the statue of President Aliyev was removed and relocated to a private home. During his visit to Mexico, Foreign Minister Nalbandyan addressed the Mexican Senate where he spoke about improving diplomatic relations between both nations and that Armenia would be opening an embassy in Mexico. In early 2014, Armenia opened an embassy in Mexico City.

In April 2015, the Mexican Senate held an Armenian cultural week dedicated to Armenian history and to commemorate 23 years of diplomatic relations between both nations. In November 2017, two Mexican Congressional Deputies, while on an official visit to Armenia as part of the Mexico-Armenia Friendship Group on the invitation of the Armenian government; visited the disputed territory of Nagorno-Karabakh which was occupied by Armenian forces at the time and located within Azerbaijan. Their visit was not sanctioned by the Mexican Government and created a diplomatic flare-up between Azerbaijan and Mexico.

In June 2019, Mexico opened an honorary consulate in Yerevan. In 2020, during the Second Nagorno-Karabakh War, the Mexican government expressed deep concern over reports of the use of force in Nagorno Karabakh and asked for both Armenia and Azerbaijan to act with "utmost caution, suspend operations of a military nature, and resume the dialogue process as soon as possible."

On 8 February 2023, the Mexican Senate adopted a document recognizing the Armenian genocide committed by Ottoman forces in 1915, citing the need to protect universal human rights. In September 2023, Vice Foreign Minister Paruyr Hovhannisyan paid a visit to Mexico to attend the fourth Mexico-Armenia reunion on political consultations between both nations.

== High-level visits ==
High-level visits from Armenia to Mexico

- Prime Minister Andranik Margaryan (2002)
- Foreign Minister Vartan Oskanian (2002)
- Foreign Minister Eduard Nalbandyan (2012)
- Vice Foreign Minister Paruyr Hovhannisyan (2023)

High-level visits from Mexico to Armenia

- Congress member Margarita Blanca Cuata (2017)
- Congress member Carlos Hernández (2017)
- Congress member Berenice Juarez Navarrete (2023)

== Bilateral agreements ==
Both nations have signed a few bilateral agreements such as a Memorandum of Understanding for the Establishment of Political Consultations on Issues of Mutual Interest (1993); Agreement for the Establishment of Visa Free Regime with respect to Diplomatic and Service Passports Holders (2002); Agreement on Cooperation in the fields of Culture and Education (2002); Memorandum of Understanding between the Embassy of Armenia and the Autonomous University of Sinaloa (2023); and an Agreement for Cooperation between both nations Diplomatic Academies (2023).

== Trade ==
In 2023, two-way trade between both nations amounted to US$4.6 million. Armenia's main exports to Mexico include: ferroalloys, articles of jewelry, clothing, machinery and mechanical appliances, and power transformers. Mexico's main exports to Armenia include: coffee, alcohol, pharmaceutical goods, electronic gadgets and devices, and medical instruments.

== Resident diplomatic missions ==
- Armenia has an embassy in Mexico City.
- Mexico is accredited to Armenia from its embassy in Moscow, Russia and maintains an honorary consulate in Yerevan.

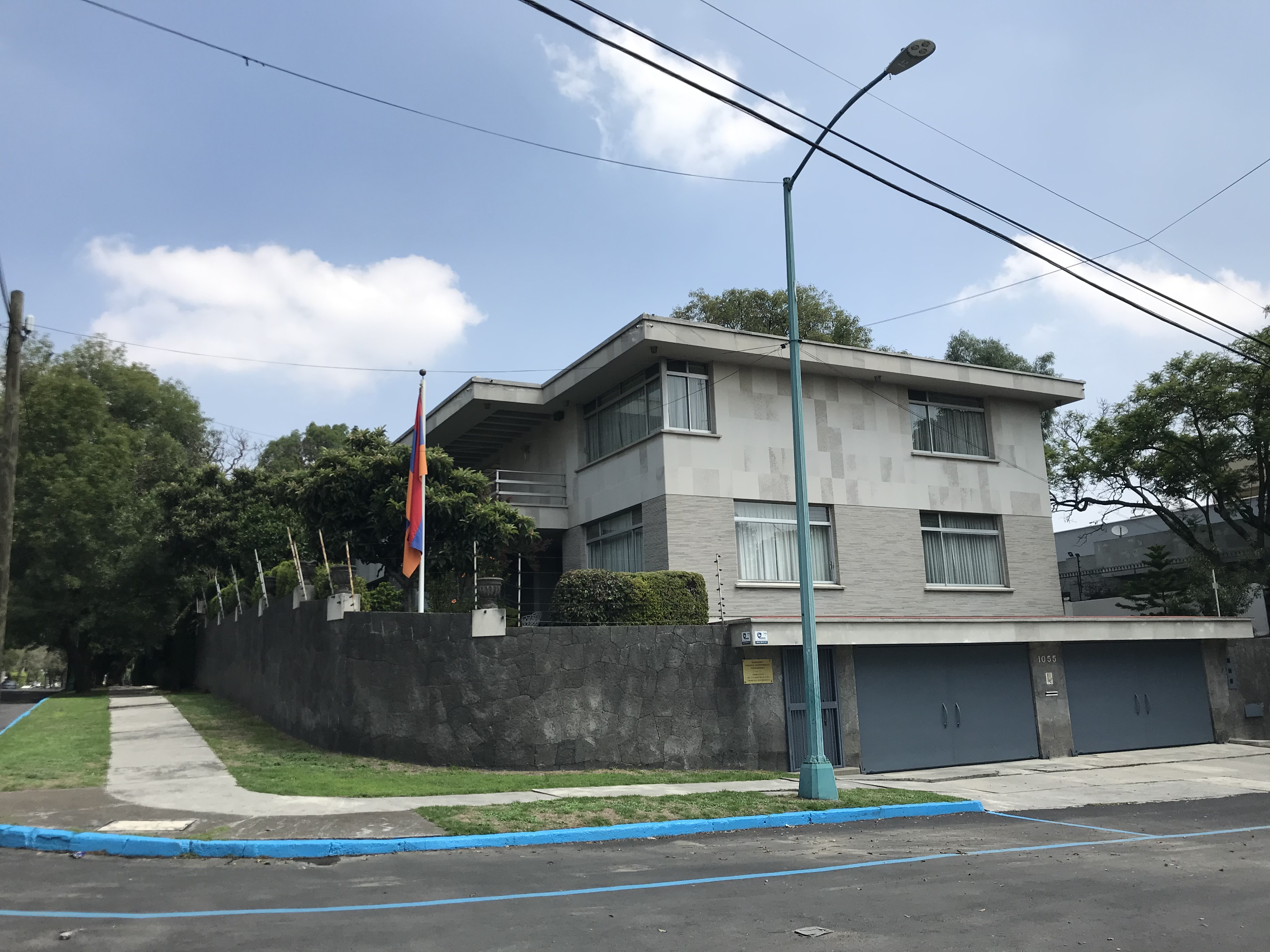
Embassy of Armenia in Mexico City

Honorary Consulate of Mexico in Yerevan

== See also ==
- Armenian genocide recognition
- Armenian Mexicans
- Foreign relations of Armenia
- Foreign relations of Mexico
