= Hasari =

Hasari may refer to:

- Dow Sari, or Hasari, Iran
- Hasari, a Marathi film of 1997

== See also ==
- Hazari (disambiguation)
- Khasari, a village in Himachal Pradesh, India
