= Liberty Square, Aleppo =

Square in Aleppo, Syria

Liberty Square
- City square
- {{{other_names}}}
- ساحة الحرية
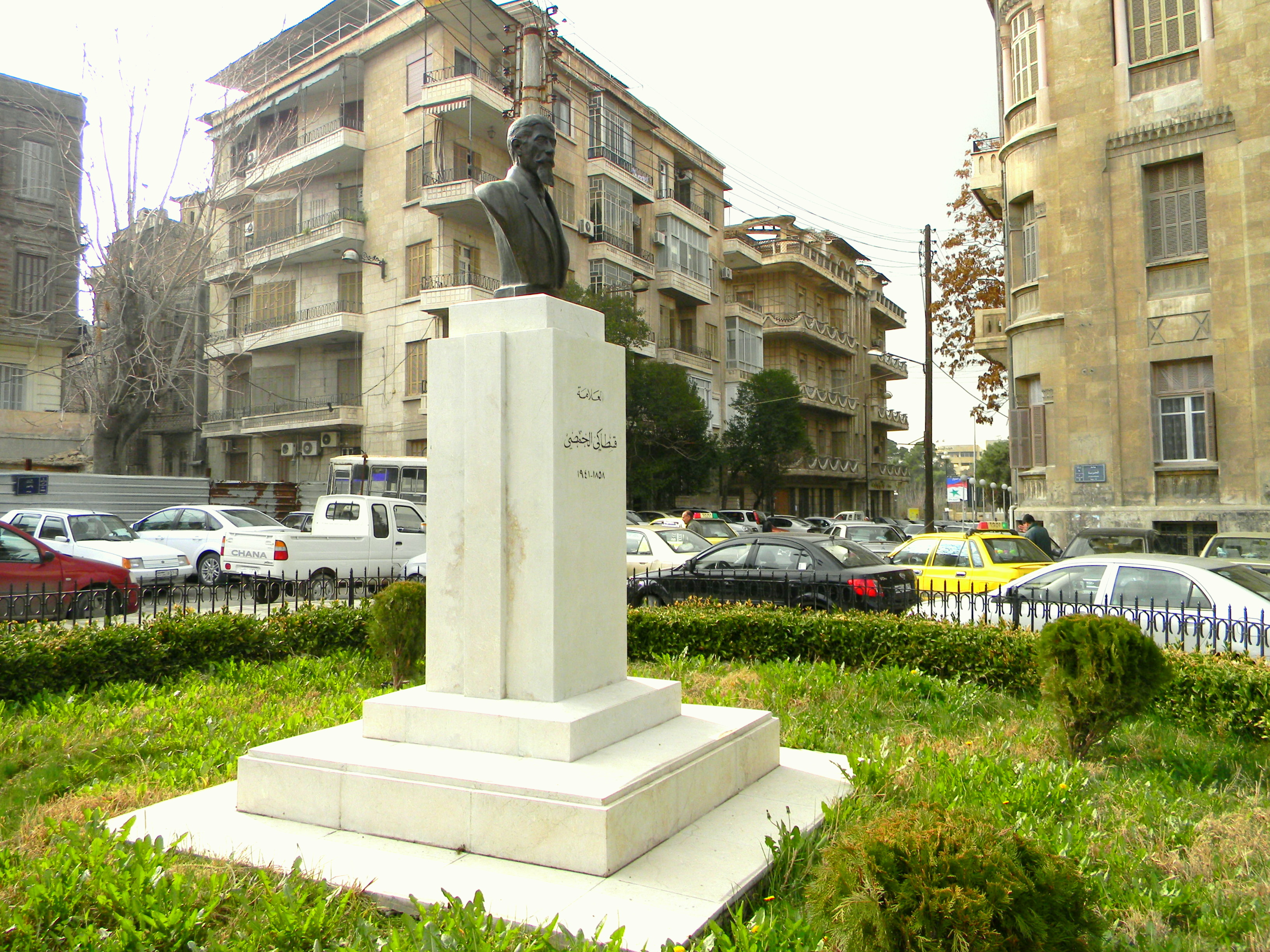
- The bust of Qustaki al-Himsi erected in 1971 at the centre of the Liberty square
- Owner: City of Aleppo
- Location: Aleppo, Syria
- Location in Aleppo
- Coordinates: 36°12′32″N 37°09′02″E

The Liberty Square (Arabic: ساحة الحرية) is an important square at the Aziziyah district, downtown Aleppo, Syria.

Intersected by Yusuf al-Azma street from the south to the north, the square is considered to be the beginning of Qustaki al-Himsi street and the end of Faris al-Khoury street from the east, where the church of Saint Michael the Archangel of the Melkite Greek Catholics is located. The main entrance of the Aleppo Public Park is located at the western side of the square on Majd Al-Deen Al-Jabiri street. It is the starting point of many other narrow streets as well.

The Liberty Square of Aleppo is surrounded with restaurants, bars and cafés.

In 1971 the bust of the Syrian poet and writer Qustaki al-Himsi was erected at the centre of the square.

== Gallery ==
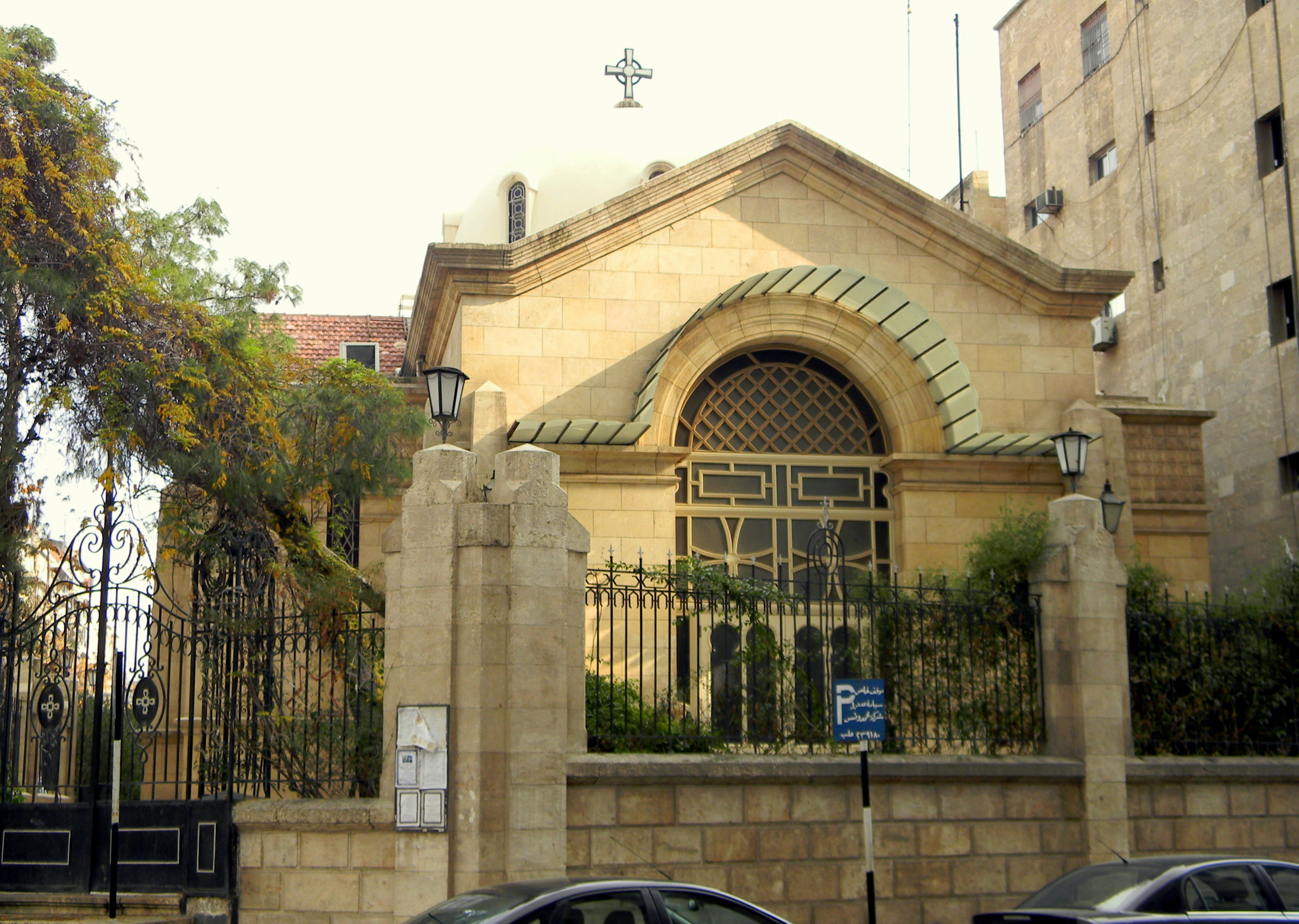
Saint Michael church at the Liberty square

== See also ==
- Aleppo
- Qestaki al-Homsi
