= Zein E. Obagi =

Syrian-American dermatologist

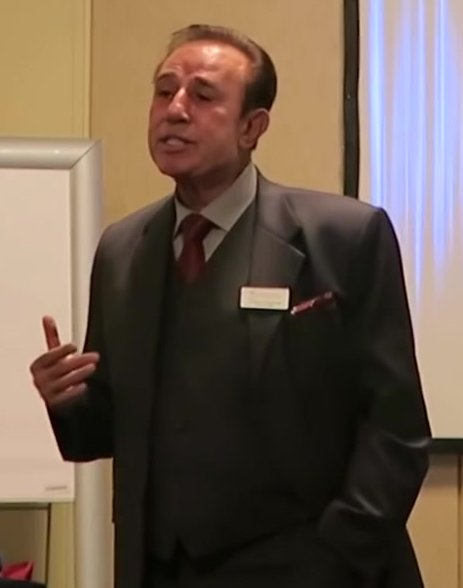
- Born: Aleppo, Syria
- Education: University of Damascus (M.D.)
- Occupation: Dermatologist
- Known for: Founder of ZO Skin Health and Obagi Skin Health Institute
- Website: zoskinhealth.com

Zein E. Obagi is a Syrian-American dermatologist who is the founder and medical director of ZO Skin Health, Inc. based in Beverly Hills, California. He is also the head of the Obagi Skin Health Institute. He is credited with popularizing the idea of "skin health for the mass market" in the 1980s.

Obagi grew up in Aleppo, Syria and graduated from the University of Damascus in 1972 with a degree in medicine. He then moved to the United States to continue his research and training. In 1985, he developed the Obagi Nu-Derm System, a line of skincare products. That year, he also founded the Obagi Skin Health Institute to train other dermatologists using his methods. In 1988, he founded the skincare company, WorldWide Products, Inc. With the institute, he produced a new type of chemical peel (the "Obagi Peel"), and with WorldWide Products, he marketed the Obagi Nu-Derm System. In 1997, he sold WorldWide Products to an investor group, although he stayed on as medical director. The company was renamed Obagi Medical Products, Inc. (OMP) at that time. In 1999, he published the book, Obagi Skin Health Restoration and Rejuvenation.

Obagi left OMP in 2006 after his role in it had started to diminish and the company had "strayed from his original goals". In 2007, he created a new luxury skincare company called ZO Skin Health, Inc. based in Beverly Hills, California. In 2014, a second edition of his book (The Art of Skin Health - Restoration and Rejuvenation) was published. By 2015, the Obagi Skin Health Institute had expanded to four locations in Southern California. In 2016, ZO Skin Centres were made available for franchising with new locations opening throughout the United States and in Cairo and Dubai.
