= Hazare =

Hazare is an Indian surname. Notable people with the surname include:

- Anna Hazare (born 1937), Indian social activist
- Sanjay Hazare (born 1961), Indian cricketer and umpire
- Vijay Hazare (1915–2004), Indian cricketer

== See also ==
- Hazar (disambiguation)
- Hazara (disambiguation)
