= Hezar, Oman =

Hezar
- Village
- Location in Oman
- Coordinates: 17°08′N 53°58′E
- Country: Oman
- Governorate: Dhofar Governorate
- Time zone: UTC+4 (Oman Standard Time)

Hezar is a village in Dhofar Governorate, in southwestern Oman.
