= Hazara, Swat =

Hazara
- Location within Pakistan
- Coordinates: 34.48°N 72.18°E
- Country: Pakistan
- Province: Khyber-Pakhtunkhwa
- District: Swat
- Elevation: 875 m (2,871 ft)
- Time zone: UTC+5 (PST)
- Calling code: 0946

Hazara is a village in the Kabal Tehsil of Swat District located 7 km away from the district capital - the city of Mingora. Hazara village has pretty much advantage over other villages in swat as there are government schools, few private schools and private hospitals.

It is located at 34°47'54N 72°18'21E with an altitude of 872 metres (2864 feet).
