= Qustaki al-Himsi =

Syrian writer (1858–1941)

- قسطاكي الحمصي
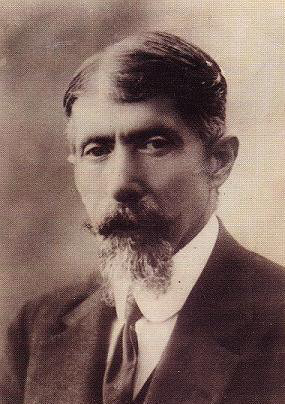
- Born: February 4, 1858; Aleppo, Ottoman Syria
- Died: March 9, 1941 (aged 83); Aleppo, First Syrian Republic (under French mandate)
- Occupations: Poet, writer, critic
- Writing career
- Genres: Poetry, novel, essay
- Notable works: The Researcher's Source in the Science of Criticism; The Mirror of Souls
- Literary movement: Nahda

Qustaki al-Himsi (Arabic: قسطاكي الحمصي, ALA-LC: Qusṭākī al-Ḥimṣī; 1858–1941) was a Syrian writer and poet of the Nahda movement (the Arabic renaissance), a prominent figure in the Arabic literature of the 19th and 20th centuries and one of the first reformers of the traditional Arabic poetry. With his book The researcher's source in the science of criticism, al-Himsi is considered to be the founder of modern literary criticism among the Arab scholars.

== Life ==
Qustaki al-Himsi was born on February 4, 1858, in Aleppo. He was a descendant of the al-Mashrouqi family of the Syrian city of Homs. Al-Himsi's ancestors migrated to Aleppo during the first half of the 16th century and embraced the al-Himsi surname. Al-Himsi lost his father when he was 15 years old. He was raised by his mother Sousan Dallal in a highly educated community. His uncle, the prominent writer Jibra'il Dallal, had a great influence on him, nurturing his love for Arabic literature and poetry. He received his preliminary education in the Roman Catholic school of Aleppo. Later, he studied Arabic and French literature in the "Terre-Sainte College" of the Franciscan order in al-Shibani Church of Aleppo.

Al-Himsi became a wealthy and successful tradesman, visiting Marseille, Paris, and other French cities on several occasions. He mastered the French language during his long stays in France. He left his commercial activities in 1905. After the 1908 revolution in the Ottoman Empire, he was elected as a member of the Aleppo city council many times and once as the assistant to the head council.

Al-Himsi's cultural knowledge and wealth were gained through his vast collection of Arabic and European books and publications, as well as his great love for reading the works of elite European poets. He was known as the Voyager Poet due to his frequent visits to France, England, Italy, Egypt, Beirut and Constantinople.

In 1922, he was appointed member of the Arab Scientific Academy in Damascus.

Despite his great love for travel, al-Himsi lived and worked in Aleppo his whole life until his death in 1941.

== Works ==
=== Scientific writings ===
- The Enchantment of al-Dallal's Poetry (Arabic: السحر الحلال في شعر الدلال / Al-Siḥr al-ḥalāl fī shi‘r al-Dallāl), 1903, Cairo.
- The Researcher's Source in the Science of Criticism (Arabic: منهل الورّاد في علم الانتقاد / Manhal al-warrād fī ‘ilm al-intiqād), vol. 1 and 2, 1907, Cairo, vol. 3, 1935, Aleppo.
- Prominent Scholars of Aleppo in the Nineteenth Century (Arabic: أدباء حلب ذوو الأثر في القرن التاسع عشر / Udabā’ Ḥalab dhawū al-’athar fī al-qarn al-tāsi‘ ‘ashar), 1925, Aleppo.
- The Mirror of Souls (Arabic: مرآة النفوس / Mir’āt al-nufūs), 1935, Aleppo.

=== Poetry ===
The full collection of al-Himsi's poems has not yet been published.

- Anāshīd min al-‘Ahd al-Qadīm (Songs from the Old Testament), 1907, Alexandria.

==== Collections published in al-Himsi's lifetime ====
- Mukhtārāt min nuẓum Qustākī al-Ḥimṣī (Selection from the poems of Qustaki al-Himsi), 1939, Aleppo.

=== Translations ===
Al-Himsi translated many works of the French literature into Arabic.

== Honours ==
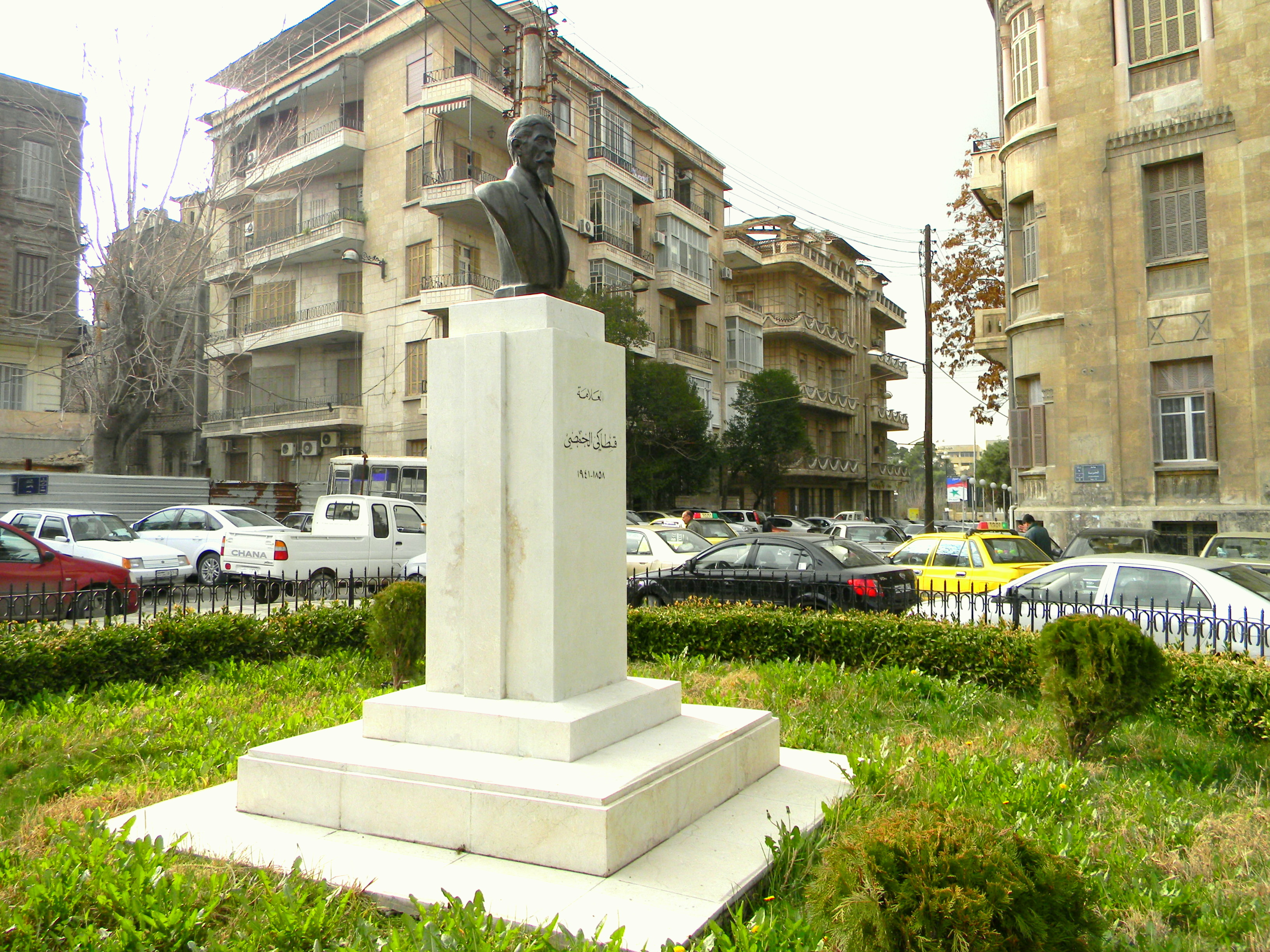
The bust of Qustaki al-Himsi in Aleppo

Qustaki al-Himsi was honoured in his native city of Aleppo by renaming a street at the centre of the city after him. His statue was erected in 1971 at the centre of the Liberty Square of Aziziyah district in Aleppo.

The home of Qustaki al-Himsi in Aleppo was turned into a house-museum by the efforts of his grandson.

== See also ==
- Al-Nahda
- Literature of Syria
- Culture of Syria
