= Mohammad Marashi =

Syrian physician and lexicographer (1944–2020)

- مُحمد مَرْعَشِي
- Born: 25 January 1944; Aleppo, Syria
- Died: 15 May 2020 (aged 76); 6th of October City, Egypt
- Other names: Mohammad Oussama Marashi, MHD. OSAMA MARACHI
- Occupations: Physician and lexicographer

Mohammad Marashi (Arabic: مُحمد مَرْعَشِي) (25 January 1944 – 15 May 2020) was a Syrian physician and lexicographer. His most notable work is Marashi's Grand Medical Dictionary (Arabic: معجم مرعشي الطبي الكبير), which was published in 2005.

== Biography ==
Marashi was born in Aleppo, Syria, on 25 January 1944. He was educated at Damascus University, Faculty of Medicine, where he was awarded a Bachelor of Medicine, Bachelor of Surgery in 1970. He then specialized in obstetrics and gynecology between 1971 and 1976, and was licensed in 1977. He lived in Aleppo until August 2012, then moved to 6th of October City, Egypt until his death on 15 May 2020 in 6th of October City, Egypt.

== Works ==
Marashi established Dar Al-Shifa Hospital in Aleppo in 1981 and worked as its director from 1982 to 1988. He also established Al-Maraashi Hospital in Aleppo in 1988. He also worked as a lecturer at the Health Institute in Aleppo from 1994 to 1997.

He published more than 5 books on medicine in Arabic and English, including 3 dictionaries:

- OBSTETRICS ILLUSTRATED (Arabic: التوليد المصور), 1994.
- GYNAECOLOGY ILLUSTRATED (Arabic: الأمراض النسائية المصورة), 1995.
- Marashi's Grand Medical Dictionary (Arabic: معجم مرعشي الطبي الكبير), 2005
- Marashi's Intermediate Medical Dictionary (Arabic: معجم مرعشي الطبي الوسيط), 2002
- Marashi's Pocket Medical Dictionary (Arabic: معجم مرعشي الطبي للجيب), 2003
