= Nour Mhanna =

Syrian singer

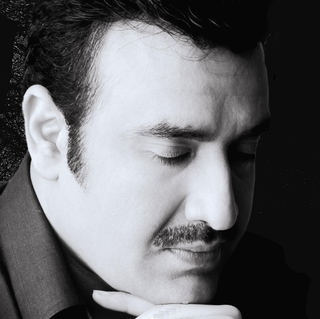

Background information
- Origin: Aleppo, Syria
- Genres: Syrian, Arabic Music
- Occupation: Singer

Nour Mhanna (Arabic: نور مهنا; Nur Mahana) is a Syrian singer.

On 1 July 2004, he performed at the Sycuan Resort and Casino in El Cajon, California.
