= Fritzie Abadi =

American painter (1915–2001)

- Born: 1915; Aleppo, Ottoman Empire
- Died: 2001 (aged 85–86)
- Education: Art Students League of New York
- Occupations: Artist (painting and sculpture)

Fritzie Abadi (1915–2001) was an American painter, sculptor, and collage artist.

== Biography ==
Abadi was born in Aleppo, which was then part of the Ottoman Empire. The daughter of a rabbi, Abadi lived in Palestine until she was nine years old. She then emigrated to New York City in 1924. Her family first moved to the Lower East Side before moving to Bensonhurst, New York in Brooklyn. She won a drawing competition while attending Bay Ridge High School, and this fostered an early interest in art. She married at eighteen and moved to Oklahoma City, giving birth to two daughters and "forgot about art". In 1945 she returned to Brooklyn, and in 1946 she enrolled in the Art Students League of New York; there she studied under Nahum Tschacbasov.

Her work is included in several museum collections such as the Butler Institute of American Art, the Evansville Museum of Arts and Science, the Slater Memorial Museum, and the Georgia Museum of Art. She has also exhibited in many venues throughout her career.

She has also received several awards including the Acrylic Painting Award of the National Association of Women Artists (1974) and the Box Assemblage Award from the American Society of Contemporary Artists (1979). She was a member of both institutions, serving on the board of the former in 1970 and as president of the latter from 1970 to 1972; she was on the board of the New York Society of Women Artists in 1980, and was also a member of Women in the Arts and the Hudson River Contemporary Artists. A small collection of documentary material is owned by the Archives of American Art.

== Artworks ==
- Orange Sky, acrylic, 20" x 16", 1974
