= Bay Ridge High School =

Public school in New York City

Coordinates: 40.6366°N 74.0228°W

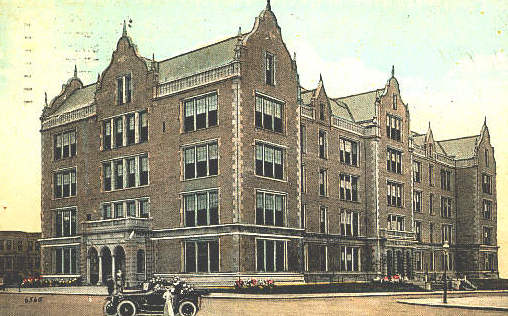

Information
- School type: High school
- Closed: 1985
- Gender: Mixed (originally); Girls (later)

Bay Ridge High School was a school based in Bay Ridge, Brooklyn. Initially, the school was co-educational, but when New Utrecht High School was formed, it became an all-girls high school. It served as the sister school to Brooklyn Technical High School. It was closed in 1985.

It later became the High School of Telecommunications Arts and Technology.

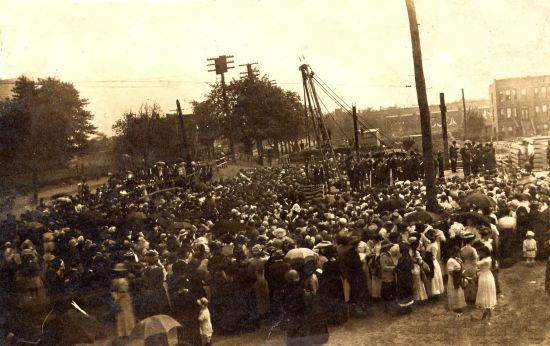
Groundbreaking ceremony in 1913

== Notable alumni ==
- Fritzie Abadi, artist
- Clara Bow, silent film actress
