= Hasara =

Hasara हँसरा
- Village Development Committee
- Country: Nepal
- Zone: Lumbini Zone
- District: Gulmi District

Population (1991)
  - Total: 2,645
- Time zone: UTC+5:45 (Nepal Time)

Hasara is a village and municipality in Gulmi District in the Lumbini Zone of central Nepal. At the time of the 1991 Nepal census it had a population of 2645 persons living in 500 individual households.
