= Berge Bulbulian =

American writer

Berge Bulbulian (November 10, 1925 – January 26, 2017) was an American writer of Armenian descent. Born in Mexico, he grew up in the Del Ray area in a farm. He served in the Navy of the United States during World War II. After attending Fresno State College, Bulbulian studied at UCLA, from where he graduated in 1950 with a B.A. in philosophy. During the 1970s he was president of a local Fresno grassroots group National Land for People (1974), formerly the Western Water Resources Council. In 1990 he became an editorial writer for The Fresno Bee and started work on The Fresno Armenians: History of a Diaspora Community (2000). a book written by him and published in November 2001 by the California State University, Fresno Press. This book is considered an important scholarly research on the Fresno Armenian community.
