= Battle of Zacatecas =

The Battle of Zacatecas can refer to the following:

- Battle of Zacatecas (1811), the second battle of the Mexican War of Independence
- Battle of Zacatecas (1835), a victory of federal forces led by Antonio López de Santa Anna over rebel forces under Francisco García Salinas
- Battle of Zacatecas (1914), a victory for rebel forces against the central Mexican government during the Mexican Revolution
