= Hezari, Chabahar =

Hezari هزاري
- Village
- Location within Iran
- Coordinates: 25°31′23″N 61°17′11″E
- Country: Iran
- Province: Sistan and Baluchestan
- County: Chabahar
- Bakhsh: Dashtiari
- Rural District: Bahu Kalat

Population (2006)
  - Total: 205
- Time zone: UTC+3:30 (IRST)
  - Summer (DST): UTC+4:30 (IRDT)

Hezari (Persian: هزاري, also Romanized as Hezārī and Hazari) is a village in Bahu Kalat Rural District, Dashtiari District, Chabahar County, Sistan and Baluchestan Province, Iran. At the 2006 census, its population was 205, in 27 families.
