= Həzrə, Qabala =

Həzrə
- Municipality
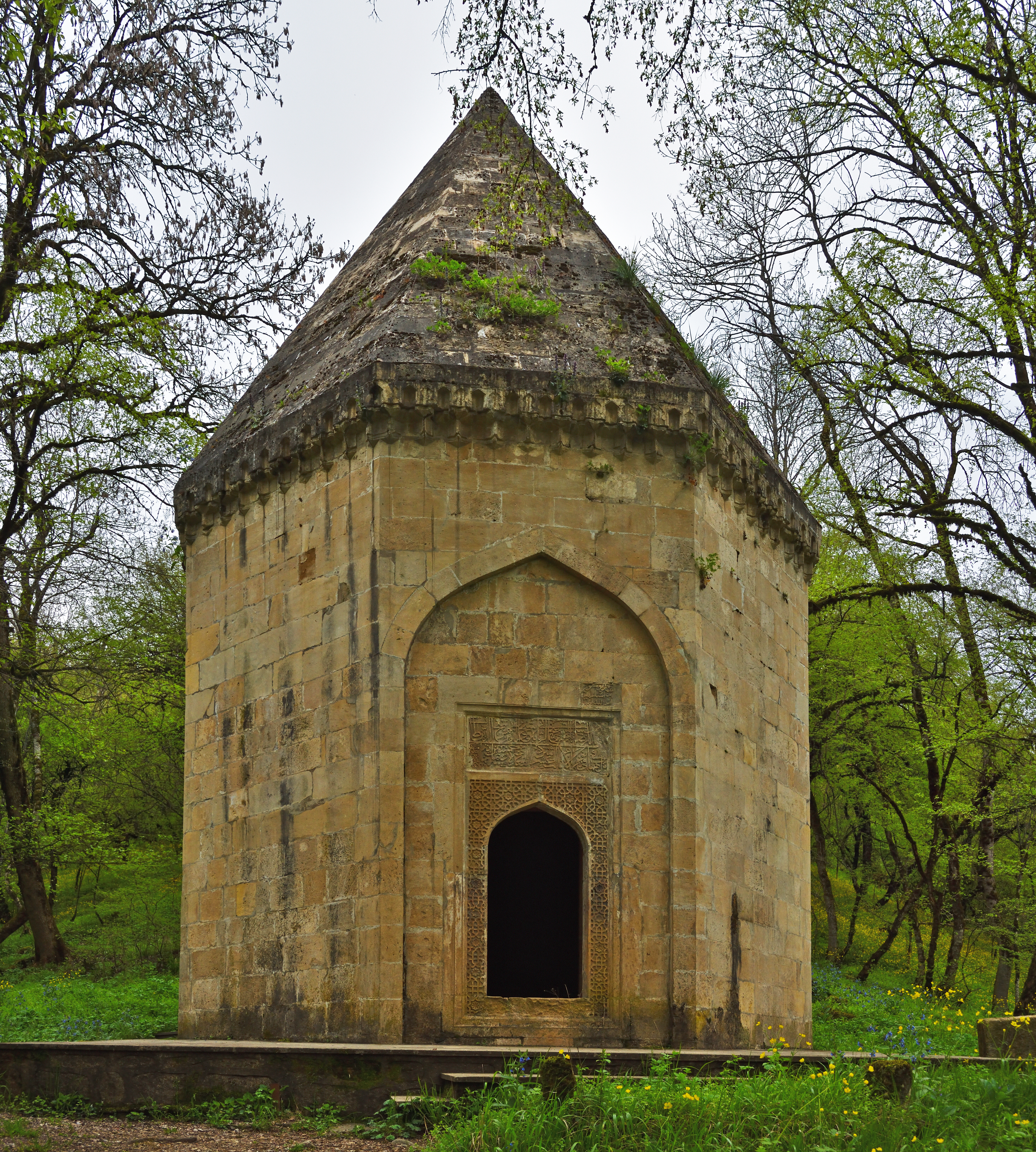
- Hazra SheikhBadraddinTomb

- Location within Azerbaijan Location within Shaki-Zagatala Economic Region
- Coordinates: 40°54′42″N 47°58′08″E
- Country: Azerbaijan
- Rayon: Qabala

Population
  - Total: 324
- Time zone: UTC+4 (AZT)

Həzrə (also, Khazra and Khazrya) is a village and municipality in the Qabala Rayon of Azerbaijan. It has a population of 324.
