= Hazar Tabbakh =

Syrian poet

- Born: August 9, 1964 (age 61); Aleppo, Syria
- Citizenship: Syrian
- Education: University of Aleppo
- Occupations: Poet and writer
- Notable work: Shadow scattering; Praying for Gaza; They say about me....and I confess; On the surface of smoke, I float

Hazar Tabbakh (Arabic: هزار طباخ; born on August 9, 1964) is a Syrian poet and writer who has published several poetry collections, the most well-known poetry collection "On the Surface of Smoke, I Float", in which she addressed the subject of her motherland, Syria, and Lebanon; where she grew up for some years of her life. She published another poetry collection entitled "Shadow Scattering" by Khatwah for Publishing and Distributing, as well as the book "Praying for Gaza" published by Dar-Alamir in partnership with an elite poet of Al-Hakaya Literary Forum, in which she addressed the besieged Gaza Strip through a number of poems and sonnets.

== Personal life and education ==
Hazar Tabbakh was born on August 9, 1964, in the city of Aleppo, Syria, and grew up there. She studied civil engineering before shifted to study English Literature. Hazar has been writing poetry since childhood and participated in several literary activities in high school and secondary school. She also participated in several events in Damascus under the auspices of Al-Hakaya Literary Forum.

== Career ==
Writing poetry marked the beginning of Hazar Tabbakh's career as a writer and publisher. Within a short time, she became a member of numerous literary forums and clubs including: Al-Hakaya Literary Forumand the Free International Association of Arab Translators and Linguists, where she supervised the poetry section as well as, Al-Fakhora literary Forum, in addition to, Al-brari Forum where she supervised the poetry section as well. Hazar won the second-place award for her poem "we were finished" in the first competition of Al-Hakaya literary forum.

She published a collection entitled "On the Surface of Smoke, I Float" published by Dar-Alamir for culture and science, this collection included 18 poems in Arab poetry, most notably: "what Scattered from newspaper", "Tenfinger tips", "For reconfiguration... The story", "If the sad swan talks", "The branch has the lust for wandering" and many others.

== Works ==
Some of Tabbakh's well-known works:

- "Shadow scattering" (original title: baʿṯharat ẓel)(poetry collection issued by Khatwah For Publishing and Distributing.
- "Praying for Gaza" (original title: ṣalawāt lewaǧh ġaza)(poetry collection issued by Dar-Alamir in partnership with an elite poets of Al-Hakaya Literary Forum).
- "They say about me....and I confess" (original title: yqūlūn ʿny.....wa āʿtaref).
