= Jean Boghossian =

Belgian-Lebanese artist

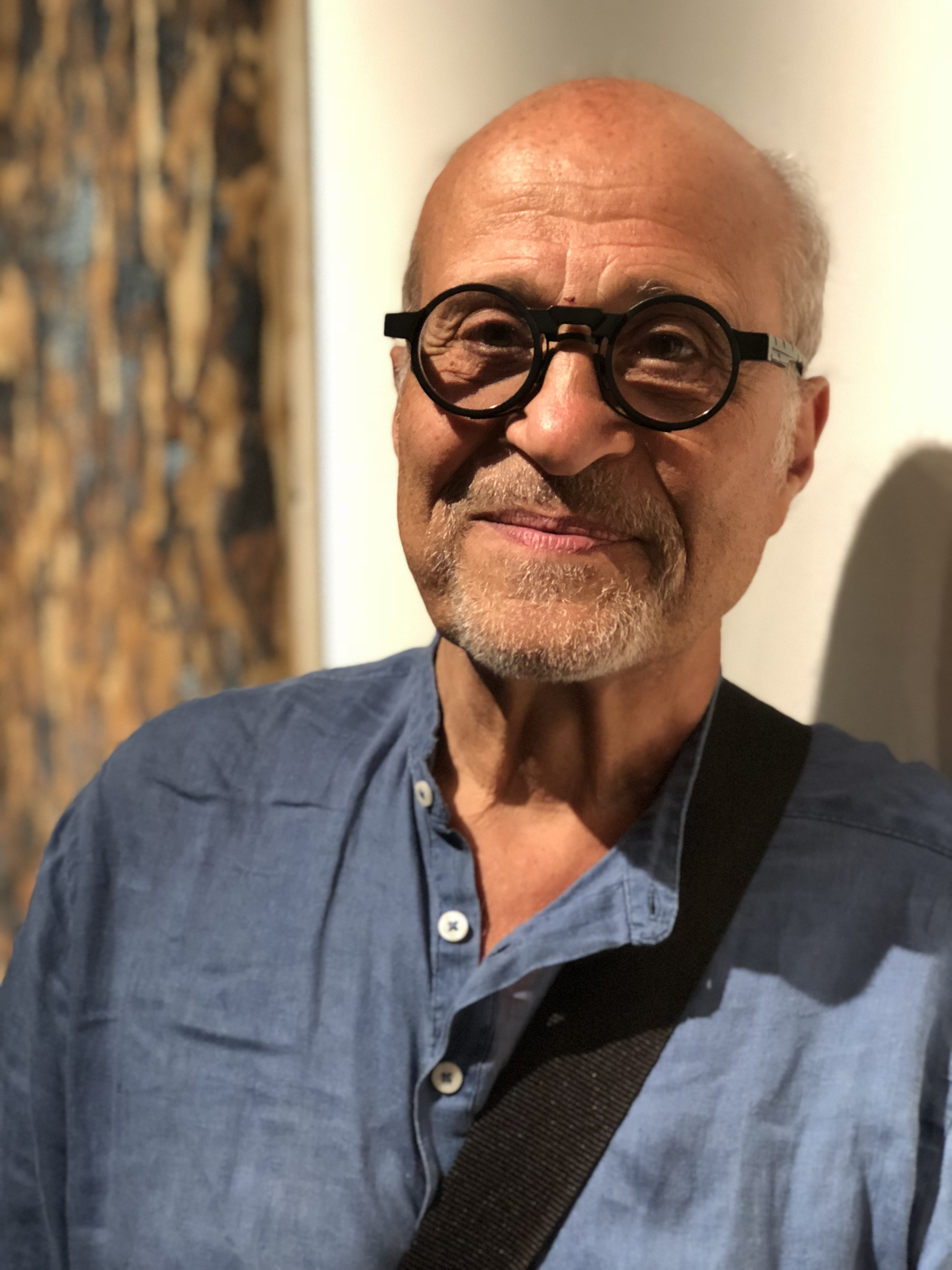
- Born: March 3, 1949 (age 77); Aleppo, Syria
- Movement: Zero, Fluxus
- Website: jeanboghossian.com

Jean Boghossian (/bəˈɡoʊziən/; born 1949) is a Belgian-Lebanese artist, sculptor, and painter of Armenian descent. He is one of the few artists globally who experiment by applying fire and smoke to his works.

== Early life ==
Jean Boghossian was born in Aleppo, Syria. His father, Robert Boghossian, was a 4th generation jeweler and businessman who encouraged his sons Jean and Albert to learn the family trade, which led the brothers to pursue apprenticeships in jewelry from a very young age.

According to Boghossian, his father believed "the son of a jeweler must be a designer", and therefore from the age of six years old he was given private drawing lessons by a teacher that would visit him at his home.

== Working with fire ==
Although Jean Boghossian did not personally subscribe to any one school, he is associated with the Zero movement and Fluxus. The artist says fire became his medium of choice after 14 years of experimentation. In a jeweler family, handling various torches is a common practice in the Handmade jewelry making process, which he explains is why he gravitated towards this specific style.

His process involves burning paper, canvas and plastics in his works. Although working with fire usually present different shades of black and grey, Boghossian tends to incorporate a vibrant colour palette that stems from his background as an expert in diamonds, precious stones and jewellery, sometimes leading to artworks which are more colourful. To achieve this, he incorporates the use of watercolors, oil paints & pigments.

Through a process of destruction and re-creation, the boundaries between drawing, painting and sculpture seem blurred in Boghossian's work. Some of the art galleries that have worked with him in the past have called him an alchemist for his work with fire, which poses many hazard risks.

Other works from Boghossian make use of a folding technique that looks similar to a crease pattern, as well as collage, these help add a new dimension to the artworks as they are subjected to fire in his process. Boghossian's sculptures are usually made from wood, marble, bronze or polystyrene.

== At the Venice Biennale ==
After Armenia won the Golden Lion at the 56th Venice Biennale in 2015, the Ministry of Culture of the Republic of Armenia invited Jean Boghossian, an ethnic Armenian, to represent the country during the 57th Venice Biennale in 2017.

Titled La Fiamma Inestinguibile, the exhibition was held from May 13 to November 26, 2017, displayed at two venues, Moorat-Raphael College at Palazzo Zenobio, and Chiesa di Santa Croce degli Armeni, on Calle Dei Armeni (Armenia Street). The curator of this exhibition was Bruno Corà, Italian art critic and President of the Burri Foundation.

Jean Boghossian and Bruno Corà returned to Venice during the 59th edition of the Biennale in 2022, this time showcasing an independent work on the terrace of the Compagnia della Vela on the Molo Marciano in St Mark's Basin. A large sculpture-installation titled Melencolia Contemporanea, 2022, inspired by Albrecht Dürer's engraving Melencolia I, 1514.

== Jean Boghossian and Bruno Corà ==
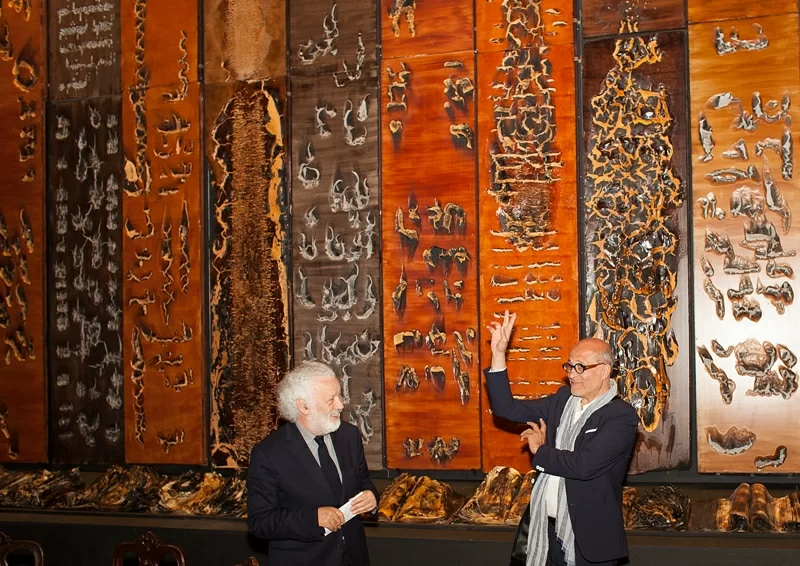
Jean Boghossian and Bruno Corà, opening of La Fiamma Inestinguibile 2017.

After a visit to the artists studio in 2015, a friend of Jean Boghossian had taken a few catalogues to share with some friends. One of those people happened to be Bruno Corà, president of the Burri Foundation, who found interest in Boghossian's works and reached out to him after a few months . The two would meet later that year during Art Basel 2015 and spend some time discussing various topics.

Around that period, Boghossian was invited to exhibit at the Beirut Exhibition Center in Lebanon. Given the occasion he invited Bruno Corà to visit him in his studio in Brussels, and the Italian curator and art critic accepted. The meeting proved to be a success as Corà later traveled to Beirut and curated Tra Due Fuochi in 2016.

The following year Boghossian would be called to represent Armenia during the 57th Venice Biennale. The exhibition, titled La Fiamma Inestinguibile, was also curated by Bruno Corà.

Over the years Bruno Corà has curated multiple exhibitions of Jean Boghossian, which include museum solo shows such as Sensitive Traces at the Museum of Ixelles in Brussels (2017), Building with Fire at the L’Orient le Jour Building in Beirut (2018), Cease Fire! at the Palace of Nations in Geneva (2019) and Dialogue at the Matenadaran in Yerevan (2022). And an installation, Melencholia Contemporanea, during the 59th Venice Biennale in 2022.

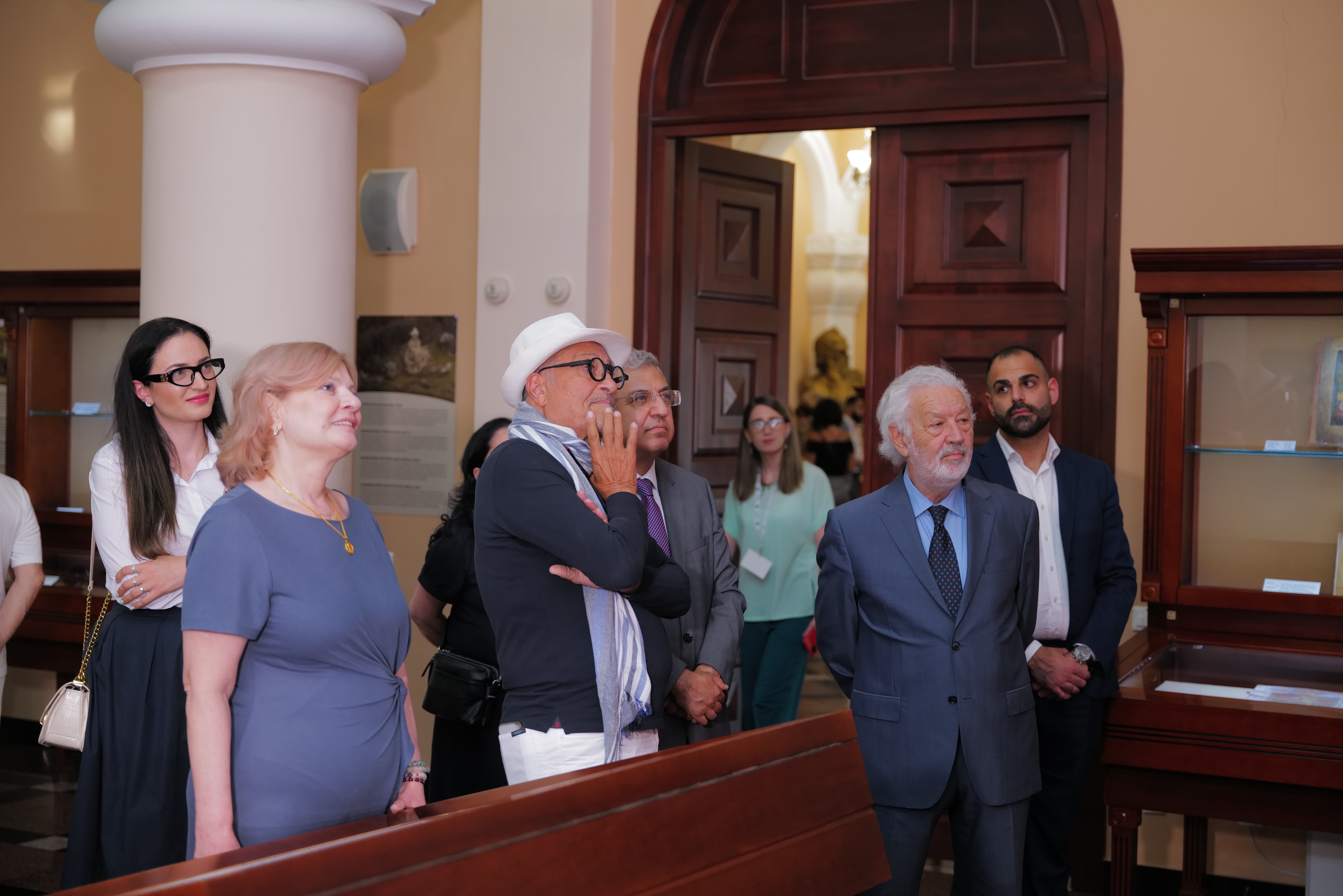
Jean Boghossian and Bruno Corà, opening of Dialogue in 2022.

Bruno Corà has been an art critic and curator since the mid-1960s. Currently president of the Burri Foundation, he has curated several international art Biennals; such as Dakar, Gubbio and La Spezia. He has more than three hundred critical essays on contemporary art that have been published in monographs, newspapers, and trade journals.

Corà has curated exhibitions of international artists such as Giuseppe Uncini, Vincenzo Agnetti, Alberto Burri, Louise Nevelson, Yves Klein, Alighiero Boetti, Lucio Fontana, Michelangelo Pistoletto, Fausto Melotti, Enrico Castellani, Luciano Fabro, Giulio Paolini, and Francesco Lo Savio.

== Exhibitions ==
Selected Solo Exhibitions
Year	Exhibition
2024	Flames, Anima Gallery, Doha, Qatar
2023	Unveiling the Elemental, Mark Hachem Gallery, Paris, France
2023	The Language of Fire, Flaming Imaginary, Fondazione Sicilia, Villa Zito, Palermo, Italy
2023	Making Waves, Boon Gallery, Knokke, Belgium
2023	The Sea is Green, Société Des Bains de Mer, Monte-Carlo, Monaco
2023	Jean Boghossian, Opera Gallery, Monaco, Monaco
2022	Dialogue, Mesrop Mashtots Institute of Ancient Manuscripts "Matenadaran", Yerevan, Armenia
2022	Melencolia Contemporanea, Compagnia della Vela, Venice, Italy
2022	Antinomia Ardente, Galleria Il Ponte, Florence, Italy
2022	Jean Boghossian, Mazarine Variations, Paris, France
2021	Jean Boghossian at Wilford X, Wilford X, Temse, Belgium
2021	Recent Works, Guy Ledune, Brussels, Belgium
2020	Jean Boghossian at Wilford X, Wilford X, Temse, Belgium
2020	An artistic project Sichtweisen Burgkirche, Feuerspuren, Friedberg, Germany
2019	Flamme Intérieure, Wooyang Museum of Contemporary Art, Gyeongsangbuk-do, South Korea
2019	About Nature & Colours, Gallery Tanit, Munich Germany
2019	Cessez le feu!, United Nations Office, Geneva, Switzerland
2018	Flamme Intérieure, Museum Ground, South Korea
2018	Building with Fire, L'Orient Le Jour, Gallery Tanit, Beirut, Lebanon
2018	Fiamme Inestinguibile II, National Gallery of Armenia, Yerevan, Armenia
2018	Rythmes & Matières, Galerie Valérie Bach, Brussels, Belgium
2018	Galerie Pièce Unique, Rhapsody in Red and Blue, Paris, France
2018	Jean Boghossian, Cardi Gallery, London, United Kingdom
2018	Unpredictable Horizons, Ayyam Gallery, Dubai, United Arab Emirates
2017	Fiamma Inestinguibile, Armenian National Pavilion at the 57th Biennale di Venezia, Venice, Italy
2017	Traces Sensibles, Musée d'Ixelles, Brussels, Belgium
2015	Tra due Fuochi, Beirut Exhibition Center, Beirut, Lebanon
2014	Secrète Architecture, Black Box Bis Gallery, Brussels, Belgium
2013	Le Très Doux Feu du Dedans, Wittockiana, The Museum of Book Arts and Bookbinding, Library, Brussels, Belgium
2012	À l'Epreuve du feu, Black Box Bis Gallery, Brussels, Belgium
2006 - 2010	Various Exhibitions, Black Box Gallery, Belgium

Selected Group Exhibitions
Year	Exhibition
2023	Eruption, Anima Gallery, Doha, Qatar
2023	Sculptura Festival #1, Sculptura Gallery, Brussels, Belgium
2023	Armenia, Contemplating the Sacred, Boghossian Foundation, Villa Empain, Brussels, Belgium
2023	Forever is Now (If the Walls Could Talk), Art D'Egypte, Citadel, Cairo, Egypt
2023	Exhibition of Monumental Sculptures, Square Armand Steurs, Brussels, Belgium
2022	Floralies gantoises, Coutre, Ghent, Belgium
2021	Art on Paper 2021, Galérie Valérie Bach, Bozar, Brussels, Belgium
2019	Ekphrasis, Boghossian Foundation, Villa Empain, Brussels, Belgium
2018	1914 – 1918: Not Then, Not Now, Not Ever! (Featuring 31 international artists representing 31 countries, amongst Christian Boltanski, Berlinde De Bruyckere, Tony Cragg, Anish Kapoor, Hermann Nitsch, Kiki Smith), Varusschlacht Museum und Park Kalkriesse, Germany
2018	26th Exhibition of Monumental Sculptures, Square Armand Steurs, Brussels, Belgium
2018	Monumento (Featuring Carlos Albert, Johan Baudart, Beppo, Pol Bury, Olivier Jean Caloin, Joël Canat), InSitu and Land Art Brussels, Brussels, Belgium
2015	Au rendez-vous des Amis (International exhibition-conference featuring 66 artists), Palazzo Vitelli, Città di Castello, Italy
2015	Sonoro Visiva, Esprienze di confine linguistico, Museo Archeologico di Atina e della Valle di Comino “G. Visacchi”, featuring Bizhan Bassiri, Giuseppe Chiari, Jannis Kounellis, Daniele Lombardi, Renato Ranaldi, Carlo Rea, Atina, Italy
2015	Le Chat au Journal, Fonds Erasme, featuring, Jean Boghossian, Michaël Borremans, Isabelle de Borchgrave, Hervé Di Rosa, Gérard Garouste, Philippe Geluck, Karl Lagerfeld, Laurence Jenkell, Jean-Luc Moerman, François Schuiten, Pierre Soulages, Jeanne Susplugas, Yan Pei-Ming, Brussels, Belgium,
2012	Vers la lumière (Featuring Jean Boghossian, Yves Charnay, Christiane Delaroux, Bang Hai Ja, Hong Soun, Pae Mi Kyung, Kim Soon Hee, Kim Gil Wong, Youngeun Museum of Contemporary Art, Republic of Korea
