= Maryana Marrash =

Syrian poet, writer

- مريانا بنت فتح الله بن نصر الله مرّاش
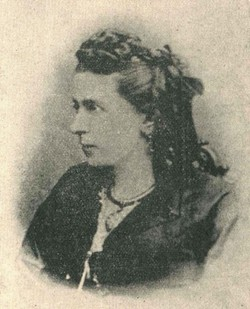
- Born: 1848; Aleppo, Ottoman Syria
- Died: 1919 (aged 70–71); Aleppo, Syria
- Occupations: Poet, writer
- Spouse: Habib Ghadban
- Relatives: Francis Marrash (brother); Abdallah Marrash (brother)

Maryana bint Fathallah bin Nasrallah Marrash (Arabic: مريانا بنت فتح الله بن نصر الله مرّاش, ALA-LC: Maryānā bint Fatḥ Allāh bin Naṣr Allāh Marrāsh; 1848–1919), also known as Maryana al-Marrash or Maryana Marrash al-Halabiyah, was a Syrian writer and poet of the Nahda or the Arab Renaissance. She revived the tradition of literary salons in the Arab world and was the first Syrian woman to publish a collection of poetry. She may have been the first woman to write in the Arabic-language daily newspapers.

== Life ==
=== Background and education ===
Maryana Marrash was born in Aleppo, a city of Ottoman Syria (present-day Syria), to an old Melkite family of merchants known for their literary interests. Having earned wealth and standing in the 18th century, the family was well established in Aleppo, although they had gone through troubles: a relative of Maryana, Butrus Marrash, was killed by the wali's troops in the midst of a Catholic–Orthodox clash in April 1818. Other Melkite Catholics were exiled from Aleppo during the persecutions, among them the priest Jibrail Marrash. (Note: Little is known about the lives of Butrus Marrash and Jibrail Marrash. Butrus was married by the time he was killed, and the name of his father was Nasrallah Marrash; Niqula al-Turk wrote a funeral ode for him.) Maryana's father, Fathallah, tried to defuse the sectarian conflict by writing a treatise in 1849, in which he rejected the Filioque. He had built up a large private library to give his three children Francis, Abdallah and Maryana a thorough education, particularly in the field of Arabic language and literature. As worded by Marilyn Booth, Maryana's mother was from "the famous al-Antaki family", related to Archbishop Demetrius Antachi.

Aleppo was then a major intellectual center of the Ottoman Empire, featuring many thinkers and writers concerned with the future of the Arabs. It was in the French missionary schools that the Marrash family learnt Arabic with French, and other foreign languages (Italian and English). By providing their daughter with an education, at a time when Eastern Mediterranean women received none, Maryana's parents challenged the then widespread belief that a girl should not be educated "so she would not sit in the men's reception room", as quoted by Marilyn Booth. Thus, Fathallah put his five-year-old daughter in a Maronite school. Later on, Maryana was educated by the nuns of St. Joseph in Aleppo. She finally went to an English school in Beirut. In addition to her formal education in these schools, where she was exposed to French and Anglo-Saxon cultures, she was tutored by her father and brothers, especially on the subject of Arabic literature. The first biographies of Maryana mention that she excelled in French, Arabic and mathematics, and that she played the qanun and sang beautifully.

Aleppine historian Muhammad Raghib al-Tabbakh wrote that she was unique in Aleppo, and that "people looked at her with a different eye". Although she had many suitors, she initially wished to remain single. However, she was persuaded to marry after her mother's death, and chose for husband Habib Ghadban, a scion of a local Christian family. They had one son and two daughters.

=== Literary career ===
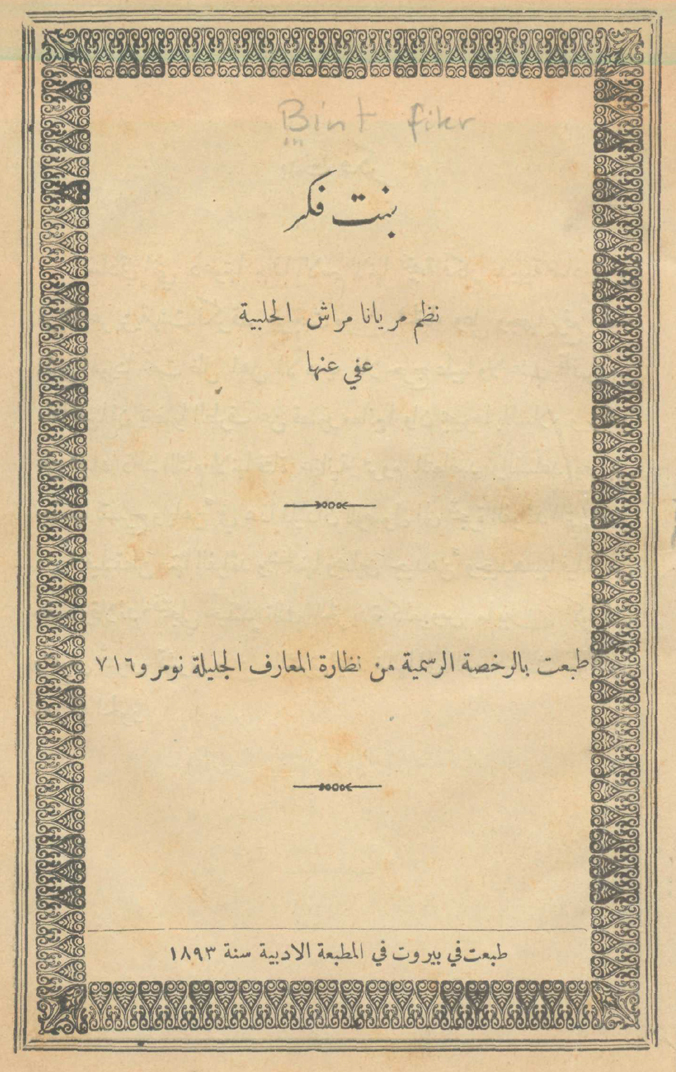
Title page of Bint fikr

As early as 1870, Marrash started contributing articles and poems to journals—especially Al-Jinan and Lisan al-hal, both of Beirut. In her articles, she criticized the condition of Arab women, urging the latter—regardless of their religious affiliations—to seek education and express themselves on matters of concern to them. Her collection of poetry Bint fikr (A Daughter of Thought) was published in Beirut in 1893. Marrash was granted permission by the Ottoman government to print her book after composing a poem exalting Sultan Abdul Hamid II. (Note: She had dedicated the following lines to the mother of Abdul Hamid II upon the latter's accession to the throne: "As she raised him up from childhood fearful of her responsibilities / So must he now guide the nations with the reins of kingship" (translation by Bruce Alan Masters).) In some of the several other panegyrics included in the collection, she also praised Ottoman governors of Aleppo. Her poetry was much more traditional in style than her brother Francis', as exemplified by the elegy she composed to lament his death; yet, she was at home with the poetry of French romantics, especially that of Alphonse de Lamartine and Alfred de Musset. Sami Kayyali said about Marrash:

The emergence of a woman writing in the press and composing poetry in this dark era was a significant event. Our recent history shows that it was rare for even men to read and write; her appearance in these dark nights was thus like a bright star in the center of the heavens.

Her non-fiction works also include a history of late Ottoman Syria, [Tarikh] [Suriya] al-hadith, the first book on the subject.

=== Marrash's salon ===
Marrash was famous for the salon she held in the home she shared with her husband. She had travelled to Europe once, and was impressed by what she saw of life there. As related by Joseph Zeidan:

Upon her return in Aleppo, Maryana Marrash turned her house into a gathering place for a group of celebrated writers who met there on a regular basis to cultivate each other's friendship and discuss literature, music, and political and social issues.

However, according to Joseph Zeidan, there are no proofs supporting whether or not she created her salon after seeing similar ones in Europe; in any case, it did not start from scratch, since "most of the participants were regular visitors to her family's home, where they used to meet with her father and two brothers." The members of Maryana's salon included prominent Aleppine intellectuals of both sexes, (Note: Joseph Zeidan and Antun Sha'arawi have mentioned, among these intellectuals: Jibra'il Dallal, Kamil al-Ghazzi, Rizqallah Hassun, Qustaki al-Himsi, Abd al-Rahman al-Kawakibi, Victor Khayyat, Antun al-Saqqal and his son Mikha'il, and Abd al-Salam al-Tarmanini.) in addition to politicians and members of the foreign diplomatic corps. Marrash was fully engaged in the intellectual discourse and would also entertain her guests by playing the qanun and singing. Antun Sha'arawi has described typical evenings spent at Marrash's salon:

Wearing either all black or all white dresses ordered from Paris, Marrash hosted the mixed evening get-togethers in which literary topics as varied as the Mu'allaqat—a cycle of seven pre-Islamic poems—or the work of Rabelais were discussed. Chess and card games were played, and complicated poetry competitions took place; wine and 'araq flowed freely; participants sang, danced, and listened to records played on a phonograph.

However, Heghnar Zeitlian Watenpaugh has presumed Sha'arawi's description to be partly apocryphal.

== Works ==
- Bint fikr (lit. 'A Daughter of Thought'), 1893.
- [Tārīkh] [Sūriyā] al-ḥadīth (lit. 'The History of Modern Syria').

Writings published in periodicals:

Title	Periodical	Date	Translated title
شامة الجنان	Al-Jinan	July 1870 (15)	The Beauty Spots of the Garden
جنون القلم	Al-Jinan	July 1871 (13)	
مرثية	Al-Jinan	April 30, 1876 (9)	
الربيع	Al-Jinan	July 15, 1876 (14)	

== Sources ==
- Al-Mawsūʻah al-ṣuḥufīyah al-ʻArabīyah الموسوعة الصحفية العربية (in Arabic). Vol. 6. 1997. ISBN 978-9973150455.
- Ashour, Radwa; Ghazoul, Ferial J.; Reda-Mekdashi, Hasna, eds. (2008). Arab Women Writers: a Critical Reference Guide, 1873–1999. American University in Cairo Press. ISBN 978-9774161469.
- Booth, Marilyn (2001). May Her Likes Be Multiplied: Biography and Gender Politics in Egypt. University of California Press. ISBN 978-0520224209.
- Charon, Cyrille (1903). "L'Église grecque melchite catholique (Suite.)". Revue des études byzantines (in French). 6 (39): 113–118. doi:10.3406/rebyz.1903.3453.
- Dabbāgh, ʻĀʼishah (1972). Al-Ḥarakah al-fikrīyah fī Ḥalab fī al-nișf al-thānī min al-qarn al-tāsiʻ ʻashar wa-maṭlaʻ al-qarn al-ʻishrīn الحركة الفكرية في حلب في النصف الثاني من القرن التاسع عشر ومطلع القرن العشرين (in Arabic). Dār al-Fikr. OCLC 23515087.
- Eissa, Ashraf A. (2000). "Majallat al-jinān: Arabic Narrative Discourse in the Making". Quaderni di Studi Arabi. 18: 41–49. JSTOR 25802893.
- Ende, Werner; Steinbach, Udo, eds. (2010). Islam in the World Today: a Handbook of Politics, Religion, Culture, and Society. Cornell University Press. ISBN 978-0801445712.
- Hafez, Sabry (1993). The Genesis of Arabic Narrative Discourse: a Study in the Sociology of Modern Arabic Literature. Saqi Books. ISBN 978-0-86356-149-8.
- Halevi, Sharon; Zachs, Fruma (2015). Gendering Culture in Greater Syria: Intellectuals and Ideology in the Late Ottoman Period. I. B. Tauris. ISBN 978-1-78076-936-3.
- Kuroki, Hidemitsu (1993). "The Orthodox-Catholic Clash in Aleppo in 1818". Orient. 29: 1–18. doi:10.5356/orient1960.29.1.
- "Māryānā Marrāsh" ماريانا مراش. www.almoajam.org (in Arabic). Archived from the original on 29 April 2018.
- Masters, Bruce (2001). Christians and Jews in the Ottoman Arab World: the Roots of Sectarianism. Cambridge University Press. ISBN 0-521-80333-0.
- Somekh, Sasson (1992). "The Neo-classical Arabic poets". In Badawi, Mohammed Mustafa (ed.). Modern Arabic Literature. Cambridge University Press. ISBN 978-0-521-33197-5.
- Ṭarrāzī, Fīlīb dī (1913). Tārīkh al-ṣiḥāfah al-ʻArabīyah تاريخ الصحافة العربية (in Arabic). Vol. 2. Al-Maṭbaʻah al-adabīyah. OCLC 31793402.
- Tomiche, N. (1991). "Marrās̲h̲, Fransīs b. Fatḥ Allāh b. Naṣr". Encyclopaedia of Islam, Second Edition. Vol. 6. Brill. doi:10.1163/1573-3912_islam_SIM_4971. ISBN 978-90-04-08112-3.
- Watenpaugh, Heghnar Zeitlian (2010). "The Harem as Biography: Domestic Architecture, Gender and Nostalgia in Modern Syria". In Booth, Marilyn (ed.). Harem Histories: Envisioning Places and Living Spaces. Duke University Press. ISBN 978-0822348580.
- Watenpaugh, Keith David (2006). Being Modern in the Middle East: Revolution, Nationalism, Colonialism, and the Arab Middle Class. Princeton University Press. ISBN 978-0691121697.
- Wielandt, Rotraud (1992). "Fransis Fathallah Marrashs Zugang zum Gedankengut der Aufklärung und der französischen Revolution". In van Gelder, Geert Jan; de Moor, Ed (eds.). The Middle East and Europe: Encounters and Exchanges (in German). Rodopi Publishers. ISBN 978-90-5183-397-3.
- Zeidan, Joseph T. (1995). Arab Women Novelists: the Formative Years and Beyond. State University of New York Press. ISBN 978-0-7914-2172-7.
