= Francis Marrash =

Syrian writer and poet

- فرنسيس بن فتح الله بن نصر الله مرّاش
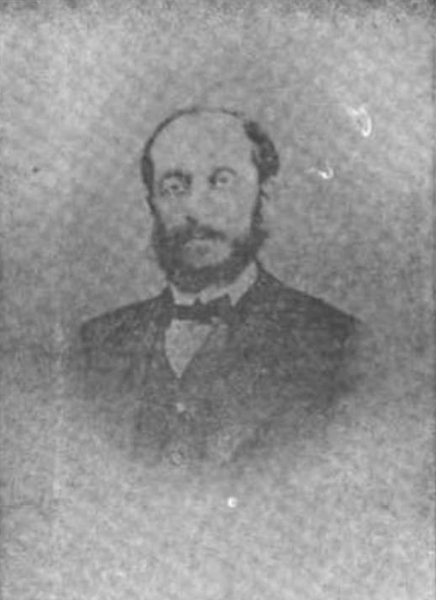
- Born: 1835 or 29 June 1836 (Note: The birth date given in the 1897 obituary published in Al-Hilal is given as "٢٩ يونيو سنة ١٨٣٦" ('29 June 1836'). The birth date (as well as the death date) mentioned in Jurji Zaydan's Tarājim is quoted from this obituary; the one mentioned in Halevi & Zachs 2015, pp. 24 also, but the year is misquoted there as "1837".); Aleppo, Ottoman Syria
- Died: 1874 (Note: The 1897 obituary in Al-Hilal reads "في أواسط سنة ١٨٧٣" ('around 1873'), but the elegy published earlier by Francis's own sister Maryana Marrash mentions that he died in 1874, and writings by Francis were still being published in Al-Jinan in 1874, making 1874 "apparently the year of his death". Qustaki al-Himsi, who was part of the Aleppo circle, also mentions 1874.); Aleppo, Ottoman Syria
- Occupations: Scholar; publicist; writer; poet; physician
- Relatives: Abdallah Marrash (brother); Maryana Marrash (sister)
- Writing career
- Language: Arabic
- Period: Modern (19th century)
- Genres: Poem; prose poetry; opinion journalism
- Movement: Nahda

Francis bin Fathallah bin Nasrallah Marrash (Arabic: فرنسيس بن فتح الله بن نصر الله مرّاش, ALA-LC: Fransīs bin Fatḥ Allāh bin Naṣr Allāh Marrāsh; 1835 or 29 June 1836 – 1874), also known as Francis al-Marrash or Francis Marrash al-Halabi, was a Syrian scholar, publicist, writer and poet of the Nahda or the Arab Renaissance, and a physician. Most of his works revolve around science, history and religion, analysed under an epistemological light. He traveled throughout West Asia and France in his youth, and after some medical training and a year of practice in his native Aleppo, during which he wrote several works, he enrolled in a medical school in Paris; yet, declining health and growing blindness forced him to return to Aleppo, where he produced more literary works until his early death.

Historian Matti Moosa considered Marrash to have been the first truly cosmopolitan Arab intellectual and writer of modern times. Marrash adhered to the principles of the French Revolution and defended them in his own works, implicitly criticizing Ottoman rule in West Asia and North Africa. He was also influential in introducing French romanticism in the Arab world, especially through his use of poetic prose and prose poetry, of which his writings were the first examples in modern Arabic literature, according to Salma Khadra Jayyusi and Shmuel Moreh. His modes of thinking and feeling, and ways of expressing them, have had a lasting influence on contemporary Arab thought and on the Mahjari poets.

== Life ==
=== Background and education ===
Francis Marrash was born in Aleppo, a city of Ottoman Syria (present-day Syria), to an old Melkite family of merchants known for their literary interests. Having earned wealth and standing in the 18th century, the family was well established in Aleppo, although they had gone through troubles: a relative of Francis, Butrus Marrash, was killed by the wali's troops in the midst of a Catholic–Orthodox clash in April 1818. Other Melkite Catholics were exiled from Aleppo during the persecutions, among them the priest Jibrail Marrash. (Note: Little is known about the lives of Butrus Marrash and Jibrail Marrash. Butrus was married by the time he was killed, and the name of his father was Nasrallah Marrash; Niqula al-Turk wrote a funeral ode for him.) Francis' father, Fathallah, tried to defuse the sectarian conflict by writing a treatise in 1849, in which he rejected the Filioque. He had built up a large private library to give his three children Francis, Abdallah and Maryana a thorough education, particularly in the field of Arabic language and literature.

Aleppo was then a major intellectual center of the Ottoman Empire, featuring many thinkers and writers concerned with the future of the Arabs. It was in the French missionary schools that the Marrash family learnt Arabic with French and other foreign languages (Italian and English). But Francis at first studied the Arabic language and its literature privately. At the age of four years, Marrash had contracted measles, and had ever since suffered from eye problems that had kept worsening over time. Hoping to find a treatment, his father had therefore taken him to Paris in 1850; Francis stayed there for about a year, after which he was sent back to Aleppo while his father remained in Paris. (Note: Marrash's father seems to have been chosen by the Greek Orthodox Church "to collect aid from the governments and churches" of "various countries" on behalf of Aleppine Christians after the massacre of Aleppo of 1850.) In 1853, Francis accompanied his father once again, on a business trip of several months to Beirut, where there was a noticeable presence and cultural influence of Europeans. Francis experienced similar cultural contact later on, when he received private tutoring in medicine for four years under a British physician, in Aleppo—he had by then developed a keen interest in science, and in medicine in particular. At the same time, he wrote and published several works. Marrash practiced medicine for about a year; however, deeming it safer for his trade to become a state-licensed physician, he went to Paris in 1866 so as to continue his medical education at a school. But his fragile health and his growing blindness forced him to interrupt his studies within a year after his arrival. He returned to Aleppo completely blind, but still managed to dictate his works.

=== Literary career ===
==== Ghabat al-haqq ====
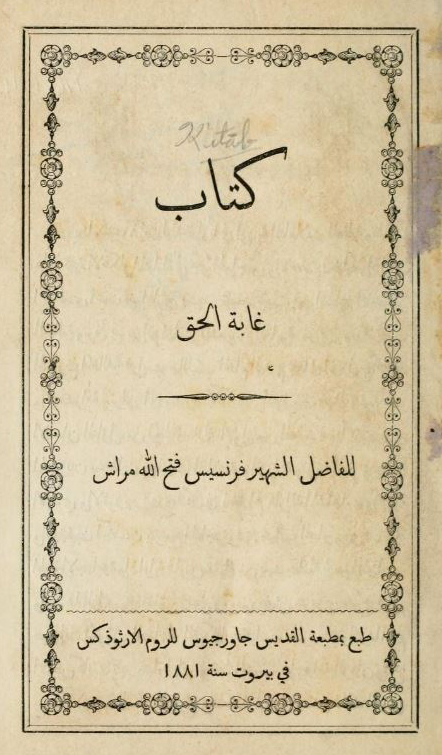
Title page of an 1881 reprint of Ghabat al-haqq

Around 1865, Marrash published Ghabat al-haqq ("The Forest of Truth" or "The Forest of Justice"), an allegory about the conditions required to establish and maintain civilization and freedom. (Note: The first edition of Ghabat al-haqq was printed by the Maronites of Aleppo. After Marrash's death, it was reprinted in Cairo in 1880 or 1881, and in Beirut in 1881. A revised and prefaced edition by Abd al-Masih al-Antaki was printed in Cairo in 1922; the editor removed some grammatical errors and colloquial expressions found in the work.) This allegory relates the apocalyptic vision of a war between a Kingdom of Liberty and a Kingdom of Slavery, resolved by the capture of the latter's king and a subsequent trial before the King of Liberty, the Queen of Wisdom, the Vizier of Peace and Fraternal Love, the Commander of the Army of Civilization, with the Philosopher from the City of Light—who represents the author—as counsel. In this work, Marrash expressed ideas of political and social reforms, (Note: For example, he called for the introduction of representative democracy with equal suffrage, equality before the law, the development of infrastructure, support for trade and commerce, state funds for inventors, and the regular maintenance of buildings and public space.) highlighting the need of the Arabs for two things above all: modern schools and patriotism "free from religious considerations". In 1870, when distinguishing the notion of fatherland from that of nation and applying the latter to the region of Syria, Marrash would point to the role played by language, among other factors, in counterbalancing religious and sectarian differences, and thus, in defining national identity.

Although Marrash's poetical expression lacked the legal meticulousness found in works from Enlightened Europe, orientalist Shmuel Moreh has stated that Marrash became, with Ghabat al-haqq, "the first Arab writer to reflect the optimism and humanistic view of 18th-century Europe. This view stemmed from the hope that education, science and technology would resolve such problems of humanity as slavery, religious discrimination, illiteracy, disease, poverty, war, and other scourges of mankind, and it gave utterance to his hope for brotherhood and equality among peoples." Yet, his views on freedom differed from those of the French revolutionists and of his Middle Eastern contemporaries; indeed, he considered pleading for freedom on the basis of natural analogy to be superficial, for even nature responds to its own set of rules, according to Marrash. As a consequence, nothing in the universe may yearn for liberty without satisfying essential rules and needs that guarantee its existence. Being one of these, the need for progress may therefore justify the abolition of any restriction that does not serve as a regulator for a good system. In light of this reasoning, and in reference to the ongoing American Civil War, he thus in Ghabat al-haqq supported the abolition of slavery.

It is by Love that the whole world is maintained, [by Love all things move,] by Love each creature perpetuates itself separately, and by Love the whole preserves its parts [and so forth]. [...] He who calls Love the goddess of human society is not wrong, because of the strange effects and miraculous impressions produced by her among men. If a statue of her were to [be created] and set upon the altar of the mind, it would take the form of a woman who is all fair, without one blemish.

— Excerpt from Ghabat al-haqq, translated by Khalil Hawi

But the significance of this work also lay in Marrash's attempt to blend European thought with his own reading of the Christian belief in universal love. Indeed, he had tried to reconcile his philosophical understanding of the concept of liberty with his belief in the benevolence of the Catholic Church's authority. As stated by Nazik Saba Yared:

He argued that only the spiritual kingdom [i.e. the kingdom centered on religion] could curb evil [...] and consequently guarantee the freedom of man. Love is one of the pillars of Christianity, and Marrash, like some Sufis and Romantics, considered it to be the basis of civilization, indeed of the entire universe [...]. Since love, for Marrash, was the general law, and freedom meant participation in that law, it followed that freedom would be inseparable from love and religion.

==== Later writings ====
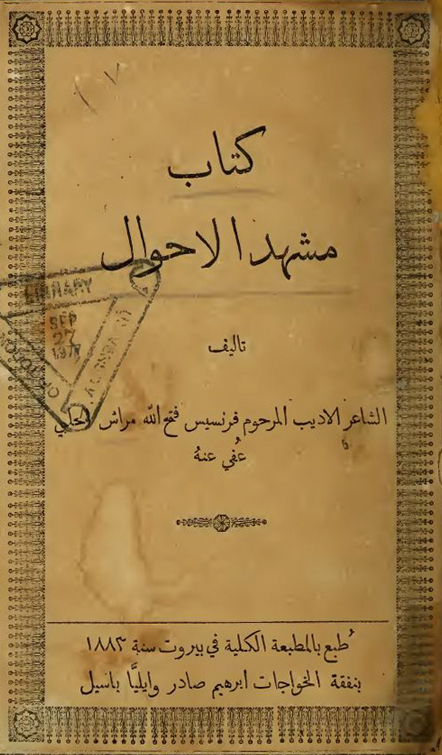
Title page of an 1883 reprint of Mashhad al-ahwal

In 1867, Marrash published Rihlat Baris, an account of his second journey to Paris. The book begins with a description of his progress from Aleppo to İskenderun, Latakia, Tripoli, Beirut, Jaffa, Alexandria, Cairo, and then back to Alexandria from which he had boarded a ship to Marseille, where he arrived in October 1866. The Arab cities had inspired in him revulsion and indifference, except Alexandria and Cairo, where Ismail Pasha had already begun modernization projects. He had then travelled through France, with a stopover in Lyon before ending up in Paris. Marrash was fascinated by France, and by Paris the most; everything he described in his account, from the Paris Exhibition of 1867 to gas lighting in the streets, served to praise the accomplishments of Western civilization. In Mashhad al-ahwal ("The Witnessing of the Stages of Human Life"), published in 1870, Marrash would again compare the East and the West, writing that "while the East sank deeper into darkness, the West embraced light". The optimism he had formerly expressed about the first reform currents under the reign of Sultan Abdülaziz in the Ottoman Empire (Note: In 1861, shortly before Abdülaziz's ascension to the throne, Marrash had already published a poetic eulogy to Mehmed Fuad Pasha (an influential Ottoman statesman in the Tanzimat era) in the 7 February issue of Hadiqat al-Akhbar (the first bi-weekly newspaper in Beirut).) gave way to pessimism in Mashhad al-ahwal, as he realized these reforms were superficial and that those he had hoped for would not soon come into being. Yet, in Durr al-sadaf fi ghara'ib al-sudaf (Pearl Shells in Relating Strange Coincidences), which he published two years later, he depicted the Lebanese social life of his day and criticised the blind imitation of Western customs and the use of the French language in everyday life.

Throughout his life, Marrash composed many essays about science (especially mathematics), and about education, a subject which mattered a lot to him; indeed, he wrote in Ghabat al-haqq that "without the education of the mind, man is a mindless beast". He also wrote many articles in the popular press; in those published in Butrus al-Bustani's journal Al-Jinan, he showed himself favourable to women's education, which he restricted however to reading, writing, and a little bit of arithmetic, geography and grammar. In an 1872 issue of Al-Jinan, he wrote that it is not necessary for a woman "to act like a man, neglect her domestic and family duties, or that she should consider herself superior to the man"; he nonetheless closely followed his sister's studies. Marrash also condemned Arab men's severe treatment of their wives and daughters. In his later works, he tried to demonstrate the existence of God and of the divine law; the Sharia, as he conceived it, was not restricted to the sphere of the Islamic law alone.

== Works ==
=== List ===
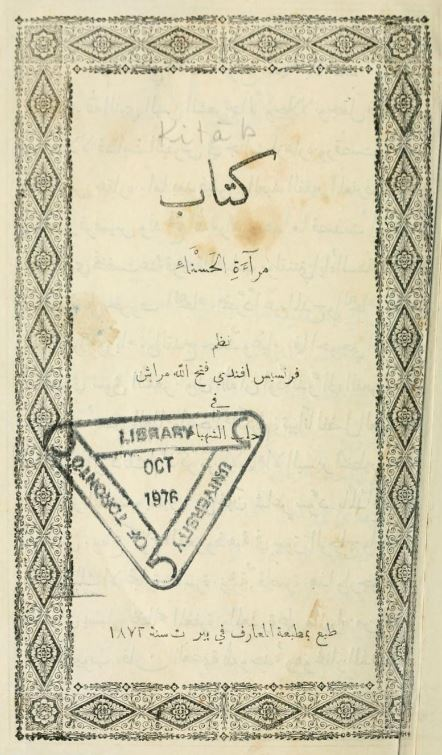
Title page of an 1872 print of Mir'at al-hasna'

- Dalīl al-ḥurrīyah al-insānīyah (Guide to Human Liberty), 1861.
- Al-Mirʼāh al-ṣafīyah fī al-mabādiʼ al-ṭabīʻīyah (The Clear Mirror of Natural Principles), 1861.
- Taʻzīyat al-makrūb wa-rāḥat al-matʻūb (Consolation of the Anxious and Repose of the Weary One), 1864—pessimistic discourse on nations of the past.
- Ghābat al-ḥaqq fī tafṣīl al-akhlāq al-fāḍilah (The Forest of Truth in Detailing Cultured Manners), c. 1865.
- Riḥlat Bārīs (Journey to Paris), 1867.
- Kitāb dalīl al-ṭabīʻah (Guide to Nature), c. 1867. (Note: This work was serialized in one of the Ottoman official journals.)
- Al-Kunūz al-fannīyah fī al-rumūz al-Maymūnīyah (Artistic Treasures Concerning the Symbolic Visions of Maymun), 1870—poem of almost 500 verses.
- Mashhad al-aḥwāl (The Witnessing of the Stages of Human Life), 1870—collection of poems and short works in rhymed prose.
- Durr al-ṣadaf fī gharāʼib al-ṣudaf (Pearl Shells in Relating Strange Coincidences), 1872—a romance with songs for which he supplied the tunes.
- Mirʼāt al-ḥasnāʼ (The Mirror of the Beautiful One), 1872.
- Shahādat al-ṭabīʻah fī wujūd Allāh wa-al-sharīʻah (Nature's Proofs for the Existence of God and the Divine Law), 1892 (posthumous).

Writings published in periodicals:

Title	Periodical	Date	Translated title
الكون العاقل	Al-Jinan	August 1870 (16)	
القرن التاسع عشر	Al-Jinan	September 1870 (18)	
التمدن والمتوحش	Al-Jinan	October 1870 (20)	
النور [١]	Al-Jinan	December 15, 1871 (2)	
النور [٢]	Al-Jinan	February 1, 1871 (3)	
الجرائد	Al-Jinan	March 1, 1871 (5)	
سياحة العقل	Al-Jinan	April 15, 1871 (8)	
رسالة من حلب	Al-Jinan	July 15, 1871 (14)	
السلوك	Al-Jinan	September 15, 1871 (18)	
يوم باريز	Al-Jinan	March 1, 1872 (5)	
موشح	Al-Jinan	March 15, 1872 (6)	
الأمانة	Al-Jinan	April 15, 1872 (8)	
المرأة بين الخشونة والتمدن	Al-Jinan	September 1, 1872 (17)	Woman between Coarseness and Civilization
في تربية النساء	Al-Jinan	November 15, 1872 (22)	On the Education of Women
الأعيان	Al-Jinan	February 15, 1873 (4)	
الانسان	Al-Jinan	January 1, 1874 (1)	
حل لغز عبدالمجيد أفندي ناميه	Al-Jinan	April 15, 1874 (8)	

=== Style ===
Mention no longer the driver on his night journey and the wide striding camels, and give up talk of morning dew and ruins. [...]
I no longer have any taste for love songs on dwellings which already went down in seas of [too many] odes. [...]
So, too, the ghada, whose fire, fanned by the sighs of those enamored of it, cries out to the poets: "Alas for my burning!" (Note: The charcoal of the ghada tree (Haloxylon persicum) was frequently mentioned in classical Arabic poetry as retaining its fire a great length of time.) [...]
If a steamer leaves with my friends on sea or land, why should I direct my complaints to the camels?

— Excerpt from Mashhad al-ahwal, translated by Shmuel Moreh

Marrash often included poems in his works, written in muwashshah and zajal forms according to the occasion. Shmuel Moreh has stated that Marrash tried to introduce "a revolution in diction, themes, metaphor and imagery in modern Arabic poetry", (Note: For example, Marrash tried to derive new poetic images from modern inventions and scientific discoveries. In a poem from his collection Mir'at al-hasna', he thus wrote that "the passing of the day in a life span is speedy like the wheels of a train in the desert"; in another poem, he spoke of the "electricity of the languor in the eyelids" (translations by Shmuel Moreh).) sometimes even mocking conventional poetic themes. In the introduction to his poetry book Mir'at al-hasna' (The Mirror of the Beautiful One), which was first published in 1872, Marrash rejected even the traditional genres of Arabic poetry, particularly panegyrics and lampoons. His use of conventional diction for new ideas marked the rise of a new stage in Arabic poetry which was carried on by the Mahjaris. Shmuel Moreh has also considered some passages from Ghabat al-haqq and Rihlat Baris to be prose poetry, while Salma Khadra Jayyusi has described his prosaic writing as "often Romantic in tone, rising sometimes to poetic heights, declamatory, vivid, colourful and musical", calling it the first example of poetic prose in modern Arabic literature.

== Legacy ==
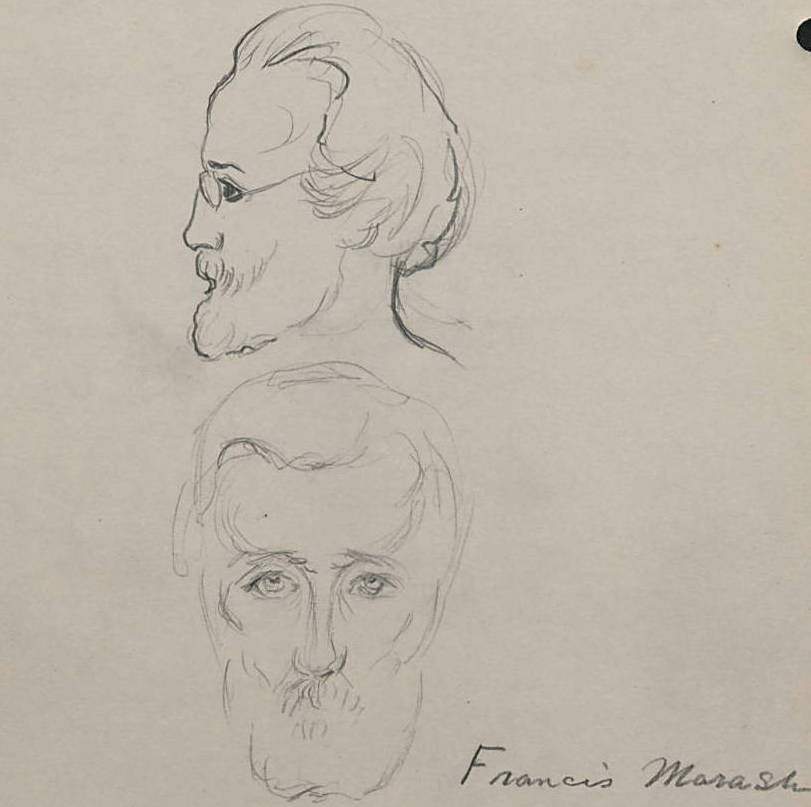
Portrait of Francis Marrash by Kahlil Gibran, c. 1910

Kahlil Gibran was a great admirer of Marrash, whose works he had read at al-Hikma School in Beirut. According to Shmuel Moreh, Gibran's own works echo Marrash's style and "many of [his] ideas on enslavement, education, women's liberation, truth, the natural goodness of man, and the corrupted morals of society". Khalil Hawi has referred to Marrash's aforementioned philosophy of universal love as having left a deep impression on Gibran. Moreover, Khalil Hawi has stated that many of Marrash's recurring expressions became stock images for Arab writers of the 20th century: he has mentioned, for example, "the valleys of mental contemplation", "the wings of thoughts", "solicitudes and dreams", "the veils of history", "the Kingdom of the Spirit", "the nymphs of the forest, the spring and the dawn", "golden diadems", "the jewels of light", "the storms of days and nights", and "the smoke of revenge and the mist of anger".

== Sources ==
- Abu-ʿUksa, Wael (2020). "Fransis al-Marrash on Religion and Cultural Revival". The European Legacy. 25 (7–8): 776–789. doi:10.1080/10848770.2020.1758409. S2CID 219063198.
- Al-Azmeh, Aziz (2009) [First published 1993]. Islams and Modernities (3rd ed.). Verso. ISBN 978-1-84467-385-8.
- Algazy, Joseph (1990). "La vision de la Révolution française chez les pionniers de la renaissance intellectuelle arabe". Annales historiques de la Révolution française (in French). 282 (282): 470–484. doi:10.3406/ahrf.1990.1399.
- Al-Ḥimṣī, Qusṭākī (1925). Udabāʼ Ḥalab dhawū al-athar fī al-qarn al-tāsiʻ ʻashar أدباء حلب ذوو الأثر في القرن التاسع عشر. Al-Maṭbaʻah al-Mārūnīyah. OCLC 745233703.
- Al-Qaʽīd, Yūsuf (2000). "Iktishāf riwāyat Ghābat al-ḥaqq li-l-Marrāsh baʻd akthar min qarn wa-rubʻ ʻalá ṣudūr-hā. Hal tuḥāfiẓ Zaynab haykal ʻalá ʻarsh al-riyādah al-riwāʼīyah al-ʻArabīyah?" اكتشاف رواية "غابة الحق" للمراش بعد أكثر من قرن وربع على صدورها . هل تحافظ "زينب" هيكل على عرش الريادة الروائية العربية ؟. Al-Ḥayāh الحياة (in Arabic). Archived from the original on 4 March 2016.
- Al-Shidyaq, Ahmad Faris (2014). Leg Over Leg. Vol. 4. Translated by Davies, Humphrey. New York University Press. ISBN 9781479897544.
- Bushrui, Suheil B.; Jenkins, Joe (2001) [First published 1998]. Kahlil Gibran, Man and Poet: a New Biography. Oneworld Publications. ISBN 978-1-85168-267-6.
- Charon, Cyrille (1903). "L'Église grecque melchite catholique (Suite.)". Revue des études byzantines (in French). 6 (39): 113–118. doi:10.3406/rebyz.1903.3453.
- Eldem, Edhem; Goffman, Daniel; Masters, Bruce (1999). The Ottoman City between East and West: Aleppo, Izmir, and Istanbul. Cambridge University Press. ISBN 978-0-521-64304-7.
- El-Enany, Rasheed (2006). Arab Representations of the Occident: East-West Encounters in Arabic Fiction. Routledge. ISBN 978-0-415-33217-0.
- Hafez, Sabry (1993). The Genesis of Arabic Narrative Discourse: a Study in the Sociology of Modern Arabic Literature. Saqi Books. ISBN 978-0-86356-149-8.
- Halevi, Sharon; Zachs, Fruma (2015). Gendering Culture in Greater Syria: Intellectuals and Ideology in the Late Ottoman Period. I. B. Tauris. ISBN 978-1-78076-936-3.
- Hanssen, Jens (2005). Fin de Siècle Beirut: the Making of an Ottoman Provincial Capital. Oxford University Press. ISBN 978-0-19-928163-3.
- Hawi, Khalil S. (1982). Kahlil Gibran: his Background, Character, and Works (2nd ed.). Third World Centre for Research and Publishing. ISBN 978-0-86199-011-5.
- Hourani, Albert (1983) [First published 1962]. Arabic Thought in the Liberal Age, 1798–1939 (2nd ed.). Cambridge University Press. ISBN 978-0-521-27423-4.
- Jayyusi, Salma Khadra (1977). Trends and Movements in Modern Arabic Poetry. Vol. 1. Brill. ISBN 978-90-04-04920-8.
- Khūrī, Raʼīf (1983). Modern Arab Thought: Channels of the French Revolution to the Arab East. Kingston Press. ISBN 978-0-940670-16-7.
- Kuroki, Hidemitsu (1993). "The Orthodox-Catholic Clash in Aleppo in 1818". Orient. 29: 1–18. doi:10.5356/orient1960.29.1.
- Marrāsh, Fransīs (2004). Wahb, Qāsim (ed.). Riḥlat Bārīs رحلة باريس (in Arabic). ISBN 978-9953-36-086-7.
- Marrāsh, Maryānā (1893). Bint Fikr بنت فكر (in Arabic).
- Mac Guckin de Slane (1843). Ibn Khallikan's Biographical Dictionary. Vol. 1. Paris. OCLC 603062237.
- Moosa, Matti (1997). The Origins of Modern Arabic Fiction (2nd ed.). Lynne Rienner Publishers. ISBN 978-0-89410-684-2.
- Moreh, Shmuel (1976). Modern Arabic Poetry 1800–1970: the Development of its Forms and Themes under the Influence of Western Literature. Brill. ISBN 978-90-04-04795-2.
- Moreh, Shmuel (1988). Studies in Modern Arabic Prose and Poetry. Brill. ISBN 978-90-04-08359-2.
- Ostle, Robin, ed. (2008). Sensibilities of the Islamic Mediterranean: Self-Expression in a Muslim Culture from Post-Classical Times to the Present Day. I. B. Tauris. ISBN 978-1-84511-650-7.
- Somekh, Sasson (1992). "The Neo-classical Arabic poets". In Badawi, Mohammed Mustafa (ed.). Modern Arabic Literature. Cambridge University Press. ISBN 978-0-521-33197-5.
- Suleiman, Yasir (2003). The Arabic Language and National Identity: a Study in Ideology. Edinburgh University Press. ISBN 978-0-87840-395-0.
- Tomiche, N. (1991). "Marrās̲h̲, Fransīs b. Fatḥ Allāh b. Naṣr". Encyclopaedia of Islam, Second Edition. Vol. 6. Brill. doi:10.1163/1573-3912_islam_SIM_4971. ISBN 978-90-04-08112-3.
- Wielandt, Rotraud (1992). "Fransis Fathallah Marrashs Zugang zum Gedankengut der Aufklärung und der französischen Revolution". In van Gelder, Geert Jan; de Moor, Ed (eds.). The Middle East and Europe: Encounters and Exchanges (in German). Rodopi Publishers. ISBN 978-90-5183-397-3.
- Yared, Nazik Saba (1996). Arab Travellers and Western Civilization. Saqi Books. ISBN 978-0-86356-336-2.
- Zaydān, Jurjī (1922) [First published 1903]. Tarājim mashāhīr al-Sharq fī al-qarn al-tāsiʻ ʻashar تراجم مشاهير الشرق في القرن التاسع عشر (in Arabic). Vol. 2. Maṭbaʻat al-Hilāl. OCLC 32080621.
- Zeidan, Joseph T. (1995). Arab Women Novelists: the Formative Years and Beyond. State University of New York Press. ISBN 978-0-7914-2172-7.
