= Marrash =

Marrash may refer to:

- Francis Marrash (1835 or 29 June 1836 – 1874), Syrian writer
- Maryana Marrash (1848–1919), Syrian writer
- Abdallah Marrash (1839–1900), Syrian writer
