= Abd al-Masih al-Antaki =

Syrian intellectual and journalist (1874–1923)

- عبد المسيح الأنطاكي
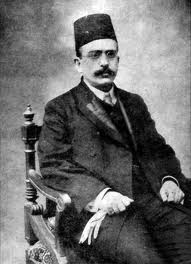
- Antaki in 1907
- Born: 1874; Aleppo, Ottoman Syria
- Died: 1923 (aged 48–49); Kingdom of Egypt
- Occupation: journalist

Abd al-Masih bin Fath Allah al-Antaki (Arabic: عبد المسيح بن فتح الله الأنطاكي ALA-LC: ʻAbd al-Masīḥ bin Fatḥ Allāh al-Anṭākī; 1874–1923), also referred to as Abd al-Masih Antaki Bey al-Halabi (Note: Arabic: عبد المسيح أنطاكي بك الحلبي ALA-LC: ʻAbd al-Masīḥ Anṭākī Bak al-Ḥalabī), was a Syrian intellectual, journalist and political activist of the late Nahda (Arab renaissance). He founded periodicals in Aleppo and in Cairo.

== Life ==
Abd al-Masih al-Antaki was born in Aleppo, Ottoman Syria, to a prominent middle-class Aleppine family. He was Greek Orthodox. He went to university in France then returned to Aleppo.

In 1897, Antaki founded the magazine Ash-Shudhūr (الشذور 'The Fragments') in Aleppo. It appeared twenty years after an earlier Aleppine magazine, Ash-Shahbāʼ (الشهباء 'The Gray [nickname of Aleppo]'). According to Reilly, "like al-Shahba its tone was didactic, but Antaki (unlike al-Shahba) saw modern Europe and particularly France as a model for an idealized concept of modernity – middle class, 'rational,' and largely free of internal contradictions and tensions. Quoting Keith David Watenpaugh, Antaki advocated in his essays "a 'scientific' approach to household management and encouraged the systematic education of women and girls in home economics." According to Watenpaugh, "a recurrent theme in al-Antaki's essays and those he digested from other Arabic publications and European literature is the clear valuation of things Western as inherently superior."

Quoting Philipp, Antaki was "involved in Damascus in the fight for the appointment of an Arabic-speaking Patriarch for the Greek Orthodox community there."

Antaki later relocated to Cairo, where journalists were less at risk of being censored. There, he started the periodical Al-ʻUmrān (العمران) in 1902.

Antaki revised and prefaced an edition of Francis Marrash's Ghabat al-haqq which was printed in Cairo in 1922.

Antaki died in Egypt.

== Writings ==
- Nayl al-Amānī fī d-Dustūr al-ʻUthmānī (نيل الأماني في الدستور العثماني)
- An-Nahḍa sh-Sharqiyya (النهضة الشرقية 'The Eastern Renaissance')
- Dīwān ʻUrf al-Khizām fī Maʼāthir as-Sāda l-Kirām (ديوان عرف الخزام في مآثر السادة الكرام)
- Ad-Durar al-Ḥisān fī Manẓūmāt wa-Madāʼiḥ Mawlānā Muʻizz as-Salṭana Sardār Arfaʻ Sumuww ash-Shaykh (الدرر الحسان في منظومات ومدائح مولانا معز السلطنة سردار ارفع سمو الشيخ)
- (with Khazʻal Khān [amir of Muḥammara]): Manẓūmāt wa-madāʼih ash-Shaykh Khazʻal Khān (Cairo: Maṭbaʻat al-ʻArab, 1326 H. = 1908 M.)
- (with Karīm Khalīl Thābit and ʻAbd ar-Raḥmān al-Kawākibī): Nujūm az-zuhr fī rusūm aʻyān Miṣr (Maṭbaʻat Jarīdat Miṣr, 1905)
- Riḥlat as-Sulṭān fī riyāḍ al-Baḥrayn (Maṭbaʻat at-Tawfīq, 1916)
- Shahīd al-jaljala (Cairo: Idārat Jarīdat al-ʻUmrān, 1904)
- Tārīkh shiʻrī li-ṣadr al-Islām (Cairo: Maṭbaʻat Raʻmasīs, 1338 H. = 1920 M.)

== Sources ==
- Al-Ḥimṣī, Qusṭākī (1925). Udabāʼ Ḥalab dhawū al-athar fī al-qarn al-tāsiʻ ʻashar أدباء حلب ذوو الأثر في القرن التاسع عشر. Al-Maṭbaʻah al-Mārūnīyah. OCLC 745233703.
- Hawi, Khalil S. (1982). Kahlil Gibran: his Background, Character, and Works (2nd ed.). Third World Centre for Research and Publishing. ISBN 978-0-86199-011-5.
- Philipp, Thomas (1985). The Syrians in Egypt, 1725–1975.
- Reilly, James A. (2018). Fragile Nation, Shattered Land: The Modern History of Syria.
- Ṭarrāzī, Fīlīb dī. Tārīkh al-ṣiḥāfah al-ʻArabīyah تاريخ الصحافة العربية (in Arabic). Al-Maṭbaʻah al-adabīyah.
- Watenpaugh, Keith David (2014). Being Modern in the Middle East: Revolution, Nationalism, Colonialism, and the Arab Middle Class.
- Wielandt, Rotraud (1992). "Fransis Fathallah Marrashs Zugang zum Gedankengut der Aufklärung und der französischen Revolution". In van Gelder, Geert Jan; de Moor, Ed (eds.). The Middle East and Europe: Encounters and Exchanges (in German). Rodopi Publishers. ISBN 978-90-5183-397-3.
