= El-Enany =

El-Enany (Arabic: العناني) is a surname. Notable people with the surname include:

- Khaled El-Enany (born 1971), Egyptian Egyptologist and politician
- Nadine El-Enany (fl. 2012), British legal scholar
- Rasheed El-Enany (born 1949), Egyptian literary scholar
