= Abdallah Marrash =

Syrian writer (1839–1900)

- عبد الله بن فتح الله بن نصر الله مرّاش
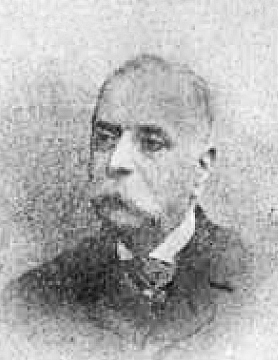
- Born: 14 May 1839; Aleppo, Ottoman Syria
- Died: 17 January 1900 (aged 60); Marseille, France
- Relatives: Francis Marrash (brother); Maryana Marrash (sister)

Abdallah bin Fathallah bin Nasrallah Marrash (Arabic: عبد الله بن فتح الله بن نصر الله مرّاش, ALA-LC: ʻAbd Allāh bin Fatḥ Allāh bin Naṣr Allāh Marrāsh; 14 May 1839 – 17 January 1900) was a Syrian writer involved in various Arabic-language newspaper ventures in London and Paris.

== Life ==
Abdallah Marrash was born in Aleppo, a city of Ottoman Syria, to an old Melkite family of merchants known for their literary interests. Having earned wealth and standing in the 18th century, the family was well established in Aleppo, although they had gone through troubles: a relative of Abdallah, Butrus Marrash, was killed by the wali's troops in the midst of a Catholic–Orthodox clash in April 1818. Other Melkite Catholics were exiled from Aleppo during the persecutions, among them the priest Jibrail Marrash. (Note: Little is known about the lives of Butrus Marrash and Jibrail Marrash. Butrus was married by the time he was killed, and the name of his father was Nasrallah Marrash; Niqula al-Turk wrote a funeral ode for him.) Abdallah's father, Fathallah, tried to defuse the Sectarian conflict by writing a treatise in 1849, in which he rejected the Filioque. He had built up a large private library to give his three children Francis, Abdallah and Maryana a thorough education, particularly in the field of Arabic language and literature.

Aleppo was then a major intellectual center of the Ottoman Empire, featuring many thinkers and writers concerned with the future of the Arabs. It was in the French missionary schools that the Marrash family learnt Arabic with French, and other foreign languages (Italian and English). After studying in Aleppo, Abdallah went to Europe to pursue his studies while devoting himself to trade.

Having established himself in Manchester by 1863, he became a naturalized British subject on 6 May 1868 under Aliens Act 1844, and on 11 July 1872 under Naturalization Act 1870 (33 & 34 Vict. c. 14). He accessed the collections of Arabic manuscripts in London and Paris and copied what he thought was useful to his Middle Eastern compatriots. In 1879, he helped Adib Ishaq found the Parisian journal Misr al-Qahira (Egypt the Victorious). Marrash founded Kawkab al-Mashriq (The Star of the Orient), a monthly Parisian Arabic-French bilingual journal, the first issue of which was published on 23 June 1882; it was ephemeral. In 1882, Marrash settled down in Marseille, where he died on 17 January 1900. He had been a member of the Société Asiatique.

== Sources ==
- Accounts and Papers of the House of Commons. Vol. 55. Ordered to be printed. 1868.
- Accounts and Papers of the House of Commons. Vol. 61. Ordered to be printed. 1875.
- Ayalon, Ami (1987). Language and Change in the Arab Middle East: the Evolution of Modern Arabic Political Discourse. Oxford University Press. ISBN 978-0195041408.
- Ayalon, Ami (1995). The Press in the Arab Middle East: A History. Oxford University Press. ISBN 978-0195087802.
- Charon, Cyrille (1903). "L'Église grecque melchite catholique (Suite.)". Revue des études byzantines (in French). 6 (39): 113–118. doi:10.3406/rebyz.1903.3453.
- Griolet, Gaston; Vergé, Chales-Paul-Laurent, eds. (1905). Jurisprudence générale. Deuxième partie (in French). Dalloz.
- Génériques [in French] (1990). Presse et mémoire : France des étrangers, France des libertés (in French). Éditions de l'Atelier. ISBN 978-2908833003.
- Hafez, Sabry (1993). The Genesis of Arabic Narrative Discourse: a Study in the Sociology of Modern Arabic Literature. Saqi Books. ISBN 978-0-86356-149-8.
- Journal asiatique (in French). Société asiatique. 1875.
- Journal du droit international privé (in French). Vol. 31. 1904.
- Kuroki, Hidemitsu (1993). "The Orthodox-Catholic Clash in Aleppo in 1818". Orient. 29: 1–18. doi:10.5356/orient1960.29.1.
- Strakers' Annual Mercantile, Ship & Insurance Register. S. Straker & Sons. 1862.
- Tomiche, N. (1991). "Marrās̲h̲, Fransīs b. Fatḥ Allāh b. Naṣr". Encyclopaedia of Islam, Second Edition. Vol. 6. Brill. doi:10.1163/1573-3912_islam_SIM_4971. ISBN 978-90-04-08112-3.
- Veccia Vaglieri, Laura (1940). "Notizie bio-bibliografiche su autori arabi moderni". Annali dell'Istituto Universitario Orientale (in Italian). 1 (27).
- Wielandt, Rotraud (1992). "Fransis Fathallah Marrashs Zugang zum Gedankengut der Aufklärung und der französischen Revolution". In van Gelder, Geert Jan; de Moor, Ed (eds.). The Middle East and Europe: Encounters and Exchanges (in German). Rodopi Publishers. ISBN 978-90-5183-397-3.
- Zeidan, Joseph T. (1995). Arab Women Novelists: the Formative Years and Beyond. State University of New York Press. ISBN 978-0-7914-2172-7.
