= Watenpaugh =

Watenpaugh is a surname. Notable people with the surname include:

- Heghnar Zeitlian Watenpaugh (born 1969), American historian
- Keith David Watenpaugh (born 1966), American academic
