= Elia El Hawi =

Lebanese writer and critic

- إليا سليم الحاوي
- Born: 1929 in Matn District
- Died: 2001
- Notable work: "Symbols of Ancient Arabic Poetry and Literary Arts"

Elia Salim el Hawi (1929–2001) (Arabic:إليا سليم الحاوي, ALA-LC:إlyā slym ālḥāwy) is a major Lebanese critic and writer. He was influenced by many authors that affected the world of literature. His opinions and ideas are also influenced by many philosophical critics. El Hawi was known for his books and publications in the field of literary criticism, his novels, and articles, and for his collaborative work with several philosophers and authors.

== Biography ==
=== Early life and education ===
Elia el Hawi was born in 1929 in Choueir, a city located in the Matn District of Lebanon. His brother, Khalil el Hawi, is a famous Lebanese poet of the 20th century. Elia El Hawi obtained his elementary education in his home town, then continued his studies at the National Protestant High School in Beirut. Following his high school education, El Hawi continued studying to obtain a teaching degree from the Elementary Teachers Training School in Beirut in 1949. He later went to the Lebanese University and graduated with a degree in the Bachelors of Arts in the year 1956. After obtaining his teaching degree, El Hawi collaborated with colleagues and writers, in order to publish textbooks used in preparing Lebanese students for their exams.

=== Philosophical Influences ===
Elia El Hawi was influenced by many poets and authors that left a mark in the history of literature. Among those artists are the authors: Ibrahim El Yaziji, Said Akl, Fawzi Al Maalouf, Shafiq Al Maalouf, and Khalil Mitran.

El Hawi's influencers mainly came from the same cultural background and had a similar goal during their career lives. All the authors were conservatives, Catholic Lebanese, who shared the same beliefs and outlooks. Their main focuses were literature, education, and history, as well as wanting to improve the views about the Arab Society, in order to decrease its superficial perspectives.

The French critic Gaëtan Picon’s comparative and critical studies also played a vital role in shaping El Hawi’s opinions and philosophical views. Picon was an author, whose main focus included art, literature critic, and history.

Similar to many of his influencers, El Hawi believed that the value of the author or poet does not lie within the subject of a poem or piece of writing, but within the values embedded in the text and the creativity that forms a direct path that takes the reader on a journey to the old days or even the advanced ones. The poet or the author describes this creation as "an innocent and purified soul free from traditions and residues, through which he/she could find the ability to express objectively and personally the meaning of one's existence through conscious and unconscious symbols and reincarnations".

=== Late life ===
Elia Salim El Hawi passed away in the year 2001.

== Literary career ==
Elia el Hawi mainly wrote poetry that focuses on his Lebanese culture, his personal life, and his interests. In addition to poetry, he also wrote many novels, and he collaborated with several authors.

=== Works and publications ===
==== Poetry ====
1. "Symbols of Ancient Arabic Poetry and Literary Arts".

This series, includes aspects and information in regards to the works and poets that developed the world of Arabic literature.

The series includes discussions of:

- Ibn el Roumi:(1960)

In this section of the series El Hawi discusses his arts and personality through el Roumi's poetries. Through this, he highlights the significance of Ibn el Roumi in Arabic literature.

- In Criticism and Literature (1960, 5 parts)
- Art of Description and its Development in the Arabic Culture
- The Pride and its Development in the Arabic Culture (1964)
- Art of Speech and its Development in the Arabic Culture (1969)
- Art of Poems of Wine and its Development in the Arabic Culture (1969)
- Emroo Al Kais: The Poet of Woman and Nature (1970)
- Al Nabegha Al Thebani (1970)
- Al Hateaa(1970)
- Al Akhtal
- Almotanabi(1990).

In the sections regarding Al Nabegha Althebani, Al Hateaa, Al Akhtal, and Almotanabi, El Hawi discusses each author's political views, and personalities, along with discussions about their arts and work.

2."The Modern Arabic Poems" series.

3." The Largest Sects of Poetry Worldwide" series.

4." The Stage and its Symbols" series.

5." Explaining Arabic Poetry Divans" series.

==== Novels ====
- The Hurricane (1982)
- The Palace (1982)
- Deeds and Doubts on the Shores of the Swamp (1985)
- Nabhan (1986)

==== Collaborations ====
El Hawi also wrote books in collaboration with other authors, including the books:

"The Encyclopedia of Arabic Poems", in collaboration with Motaa Safadi and under the administration of Khalil Hawi

"The Crucial in Arabic Literature", famous Arabic book used in Lebanese schools, written in collaboration with Ahmad Abo Haka, Joseph Al Hashem and Ahmad Abo Asaad.

Moreover, Elia el Hawi has several articles published in the literature pages, cultural supplements and specialized journals.

==== Theaters and Plays ====
Elia el Hawi additionally had work related to the theater. The author dealt with material such as the ancient Greek Theater of Basilisk, Soulful, and Euripides. Furthermore, El Hawi wrote a series of analytical and comprehensive studies, starting from the Greek era and ending with the modern theater, represented by "Beckett" and "UNESCO". In his comprehensive studies, he compared the differences in attitudes between characters of the old and modern theaters in relation to the change and development in human and psychological attitudes.
