= Adib Ishaq =

Arab intellectual

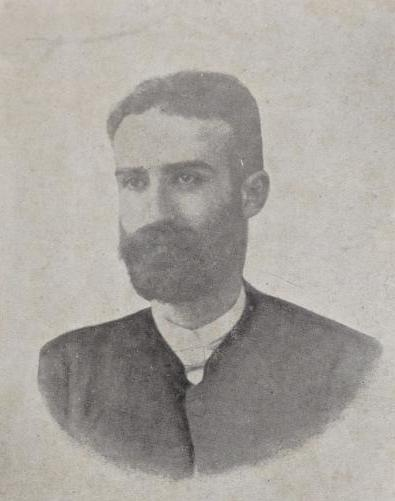
- Born: 21 January 1856; Damascus, Ottoman Syria
- Died: 12 June 1884 (aged 28) al-Hadath
- Occupation: Journalist

Adib Ishaq (Arabic: اديب اسحق, ALA-LC: Adīb Isḥāq; 21 January 1856 – 12 June 1885) a Syrian-Armenian journalist and editor of nineteenth-century.

Born in Damascus (then a city of the Ottoman Empire, and the present-day capital of Syria), he was enrolled at a Lazarists' school, where he studied Arabic and French. He left school before he was even twelve years old to meet his family's needs by working at the customs house. This experience would make him proficient in Turkish as well. At the age of fifteen, Ishaq joined his father in Beirut to work for the postal office. He later found work in the Beirut customs house, but his passion for writing pushed him towards journalism; he contributed to Al-Taqaddum (Progress). He moved to Egypt in 1876. He became a disciple of Jamal al-Din al-Afghani after meeting him in Cairo and subsequently founded a newspaper for him.

In 1879, he founded the Parisian journal Misr al-Qahira (Egypt the Victorious) with the help of Abdallah Marrash. He joined the Urabi Nationalist Movement (1879-1882), and held a senior secretarial position for the government of the movement. He however had to leave Egypt in 1881 when the movement became to disintegrate and prominent figures within it started defecting to the British.

He died at his summer estate in al-Hadath (in present-day Lebanon). A collection of his works in Arabic was published under the title Al-Durar (The Pearls) by Jirjis Mikha'il Nahhas in Alexandria in 1886; another edition of Al-Durar, edited by Adib's brother Awni, was published in Beirut in 1909.

== Sources ==
- Fakkar, Rouchdi; Fakkār, Rushdī (1972). Aux origines des relations culturelles contemporaines entre la France et le monde arabe (in French). ISBN 9782705316815.
- Ayalon, Ami (1995). The Press in the Arab Middle East: A History. Oxford University Press. ISBN 978-0195087802.
- Génériques [in French] (1990). Presse et mémoire : France des étrangers, France des libertés (in French). Éditions de l'Atelier. ISBN 978-2908833003.
- Khayati, Mustapha. "Un disciple libre penseur de Al-Afghani : Adib Ishaq". Revue des mondes musulmans et de la Méditerranée (in French).
