= Sarkis Zeitlian =

Lebanese-Armenian kidnap victim (1930–1985)

- Born: 1930; Musa Dagh, Hatay Province, Turkey
- Disappeared: 28 March 1985 (aged 54–55); Beirut, Lebanon
- Status: Missing for 40 years, 11 months and 1 day; assumed murdered
- Occupation: Journalist
- Spouse: Sona Simonian (m. 1957)
- Children: Heghnar Zeitlian Watenpaugh

Sarkis Zeitlian (Armenian: Սարգիս Զէյթլեան; 1930 – abducted on 28 March 1985) was a Lebanese Armenian journalist and political leader of the Armenian Revolutionary Federation (ARF). He was abducted on 28 March 1985 in West Beirut, Lebanon and presumably murdered under unknown circumstances. At the time of his abduction, Zeitlian was director of the ARF's international media network. Zeitlian was a member of the Political Bureau of the Armenian Revolutionary Federation; the highest ranking subdivision of the Armenian Revolutionary Federation.

== Life ==
Born in 1930, in Khdr Bek on the slopes of Musa Dagh, Zeitlian was part of a family that had participated in the famous defense of Musa Dagh against the Turkish genocidal onslaught during World War I. His grandmother, Varter, had fought beside the Armenian freedom fighters; his father, Tovmas was one of the youth who acted as messengers, and later, joining the Armenian company of the French Foreign Legion, had shared in the victory at the Battle of Arara in 1918.

Sarkis Zeitlian received his education first in Anjar, then in the Armenian monastic compound of Jerusalem, and finally at the Nshan Palanjian Jemaran or Academy in Beirut where he received his degree from the Armenian Studies Department. At the Jemaran, Zeitlian studied under such noted leaders of the First Armenian Republic (1918–1920) as Levon Shant, Nigol Aghpalian, Simon Vratsian, and Garo Sassouni.

In 1954, Zeitlian was sent to Cairo, Egypt, where he taught Armenian studies at Kalousdian Armenian School and joined the editorial staff of the ARF organ Housaper. In 1959, he was appointed editor of Housaper.

In 1957, Sarkis Zeitlian married his colleague at Kalousdian School, author Sona Simonian. In 1963, the Zeitlian family moved to Lebanon, where Sarkis became the Dean of Anjar's Harach School. During his tenure, a high school and boarding facilities were added to the institution and its Alumni Association was formed. Sarkis Zeitlian also held important positions in the ARF․ As chairman of the party's Anjar "Red Mountain" Committee, he supervised important community projects such as the reallocation of land and housing among townspeople.

In 1965, Sarkis Zeitlian moved with his family from Anjar to Beirut and became the editor of the ARF organ Aztag. He taught Armenian studies courses at the Nshan Palanjian Jemaran. From 1968 until his election to the ARF Bureau (the party's highest decision-making body) in 1972, Sarkis Zeitlian was first a member and then chairman of the ARF Central Committee of Lebanon. Sarkis Zeitlian became the editor of the ARF Bureau organ Aztag Shapatoriag-Troshag in 1969.

=== Lebanese civil war, disappearance and aftermath ===
During the Lebanese Civil War, Sarkis Zeitlian played a decisive role. He helped develop and implement the "positive neutrality" policy of the ARF, and created and maintained a united Armenian front by forging an alliance of Lebanese Armenian political parties.

In the dire circumstances of Lebanon, despite sustaining material losses and fully aware of the many dangers he faces as an ARF political and community leader and the editor of the ARF Bureau organ, Sarkis Zeitlian remained on the political forefront in Lebanon. In 1978, during one of the most dangerous and chaotic stages of the civil war, when secret service organizations of foreign countries were operating freely, and especially when journalists were being killed or abducted for exercising free speech, Sarkis Zeitlian became Editor-in-Chief of Aztag Shapatoriag-Troshag, the ARF Bureau organ, set the policy and ideological guidelines of the ARF media worldwide, and took on other party responsibilities. His input was decisive during the work to revise the ARF Program at the party's 21st and 22nd World Congresses. He stressed the importance of the fundamentally national-Armenian basis of the ARF ideology, despite the presence of a loud socialist internationalist faction within the party.

Sarkis Zeitlian was abducted in Beirut on 28 March 1985. It appears that he was killed by his abductors. However, the details remain mired in controversy.

Zeitlian's daughter, Heghnar Zeitlian Watenpaugh, later became a historian specializing in Middle Eastern visual culture. There have been tributes made to him. as well.

== See also ==
- List of kidnappings
- List of people who disappeared mysteriously: 1910–1990
