= Warda al Turk =

Lebanese poet (1797–1873)

- Born: 1797; Deir el Qamar, Chouf District, Mount Lebanon
- Died: 1873 (aged 75–76)
- Known for: Arab Women Empowerment, Reviving Traditional Arabic Poetry
- Father: Nicolas Al-Turk

Warda Nicolas Yusuf Al-Turk (1797 – 1873) was a Lebanese poet who was born and raised in the Chouf District located in Mount Lebanon, during the reign of the Ottoman Empire. She was considered as a "revivalist" in her time, along with other remarkable women from the region, because she was able to revive old classical poetry. Through the influence of her poet father Nicolas Al-Turk who was a court poet for the historic Amir Bashir al-Shihabi II, Warda al-Turk developed a passion for writing and thus devoted most of her work to empowering women.

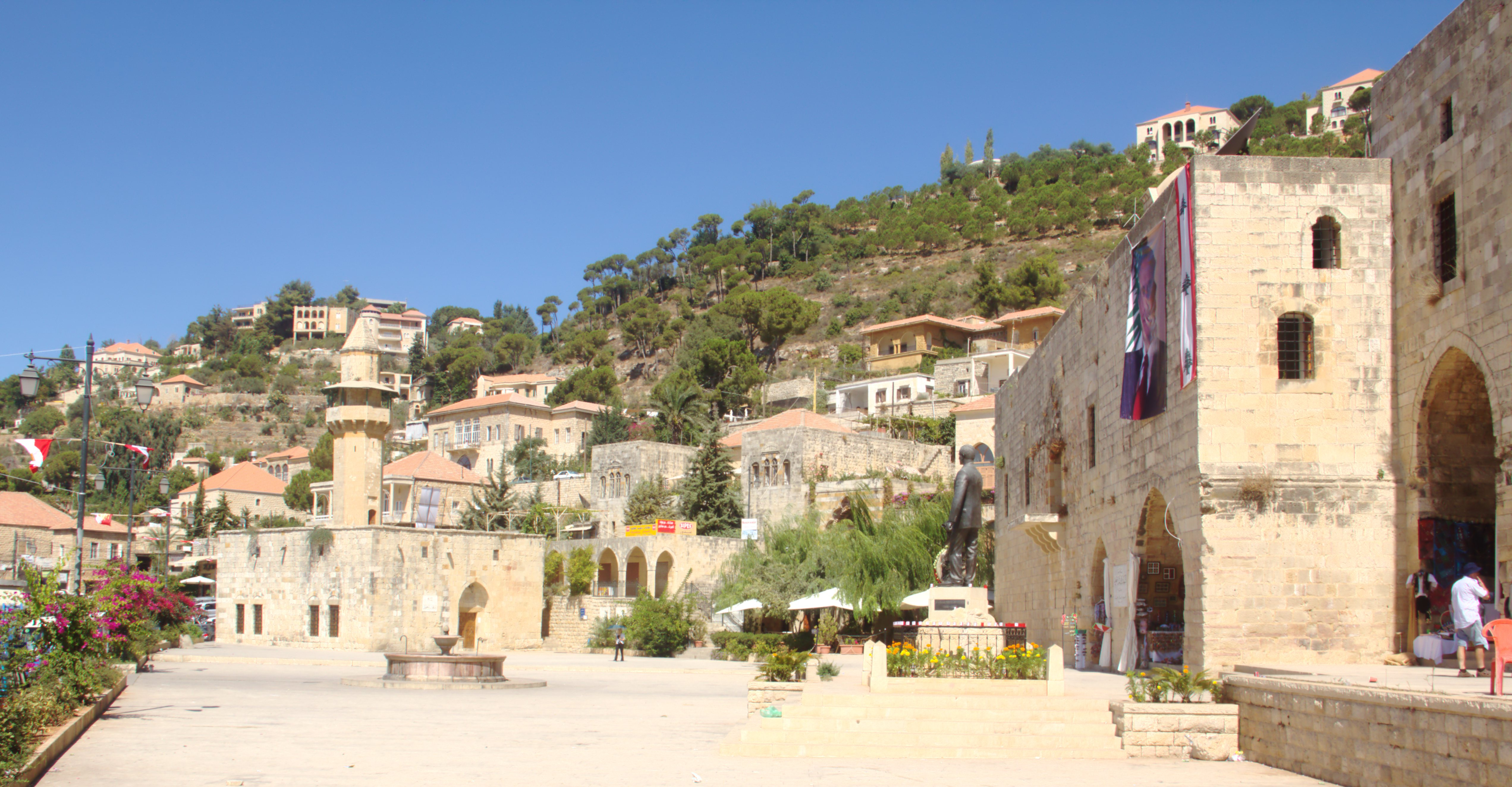
Deir El Qamar, birth town of Warda Al Turk

Her work in colloquial and classical Arabic was one of the very scarce, as a woman poet of her time, to survive to this day. She wrote a lot of poems most of which were panegyrics, in other words, poems of mourning and sadness.

== Biography ==
=== Early life ===
Warda Al-Turk was born in the southeast village of Deir al-Qamar in Lebanon during the Ottoman rule. She was the daughter of the eminent Lebanese writer and poet, of Greek descent, Nicolas al-Turk who worked as a personal writer for Amir Bashir Shihab II, as well as a trusted historian documenting the series of events witnessed in Lebanon during the 18th century. Turk drew influence from her father and pursued similar work, namely poetry and writing.

=== Career and impact ===
Al-Turk is considered a prominent part of the female literary community which contributed to the rise of the women's awakening in the 19th century. Not only she was able to revive the classical Arabic language and literature, but also she was able to empower women in Mount Lebanon, the Eastern Mediterranean, Europe, and the United States through her powerful writings. Al-Turk, along with her fellow poets in the neighboring region, were able to inspire the next generation of women poets and writers to address women's issues and raise awareness of their status in the society.

=== Marriage and children ===
Warda al-Turk was married, but the identity of her husband remains unknown. In addition, Warda gave birth to two children who later died under unknown circumstances.

=== Death and afterward ===
Warda Al-Turk died around 1873 in her hometown of Deir al-Qamar. She went into isolation and mourning, having stopped writing any poems after the passing of her beloved father in 1828.

== Philosophical and/or political views ==
During the 19th century, the Arab world experienced a "movement of awakening", known as al Nahda, which originated in Lebanon, Syria, and in Egypt. This movement enabled women to be relatively liberated; female poets, singers, writers, and rulers began to emerge. There were at least 5 noteworthy Arab women who contributed to this movement, notably the pioneer Warda Al-Turk who took part by writing traditional poetry and empowering women through her writings.

== Published works ==
Unfortunately, most of Warda Al-Turk's work was lost. She wrote “Mouwashahat” الموشحات and “Zajal” الزجل - two types of traditional themes, as well as “Ghazal” (love poetry) غزل, “Ritha’” (lament and mourning) الرثاء, and “Mahed and Tahmi’ah”. Her admiration for the Prince Bashir Shihab II of Mount Lebanon, as well as the Bey of Tunisia, was evident in many of her works, as she consistently praised them. She is also known for including her love for social work and good deeds in her poems.

Only a few of her works remained preserved to this day due to the efforts of the Lebanese historian Gerges Bin Safa who is from her hometown Deir al-Qamar. One of the remains is an excerpt of a long "Muwashah", followed by a Zajal poem:

كم له بي من شرود صدقت	قاتلي من أسمر في قده
نقطة من كبدي قد سرقت	هل ترى الخال الذي‌ في خده
حيث عيني مالي رمقت	ليت شعري هل له في رده

ما نال ما نلته بين البرايا أحد	يا يوسف الحسن بالله الفريد الأحد
ها رمش عينيك من بيض الهنادي أحد
في سواد فؤادي حال	جمالك الحال
في الماضي ولا في الحال	والقلب ما حال
يا من عقد صدري حال	صل وأرحم الحال
إن لم يكن جمعة قالسب أم في الأحد

== Recognition ==
Although most of Warda Al-Turk's work was lost, her significant role and impact in the revival of classical Arabic poetry and female empowerment in the 19th century are still recognized due to the efforts of Warda Al-Yazigi. Indeed, al-Yazigi dedicated an epistolary poem in 1867, named after her, "Warda al-Turk", to honor the kinship between them and to honor her work and impact. The poem goes as follows:

فبيننا قد وجدنا أَقرَبَ النَّسَبِ	يا وردة التركِ إني وردةُ العَرَبِ
الطافهُ بين أهل العلم والأَدَبِ	أعطاكِ والدكِ الفنِّ الذي اشتهرت
أعلى المنازل ف يالأقدار والرُّتَبِ	فكنتِ بين نساءِ العصر راقيةً
عن لطف خُلقٍ أتى في الناس بالعجبِ	يا من جلت دُرَّ لفظٍ جآءَ يخبرنا
على السماع فكانت عنهُ لم تَغِبِ	أنتِ التي شَغَفَت قلب المحبّ بها
لكن توارت عن الأبصار في الحُجُبِ	كريمةٌ شَنَّفَت أخبارها أُذُني
بحسن لطفٍ ورأيٍ غير مضطربِ	قد شرَّفَت قدر هذا الفنّ بارزةً
فينجلي مثل عقد اللؤلؤِ الرَّطِبِ	تزيّنُ الطرس في خطٍّ تنمقهُ

In her poem, Al-Yazigi emphasizes the kinship between them. Sharing the same name, al-Yazigi calls out to el Turk at the beginning of her poem “Oh Rose of the Turks, I am Rose of the Arabs". Throughout her poem, al-Yazigi recognizes Warda el Turk's talent and her exquisite use of language. The poem was published, along with a collection of other Arabic feminist writings, in "Opening the Gates: A Century of Arab Feminist Writing" by Margot Badran and Miriam Cooke.

Also, the Lebanese Women's Union expressed their recognition during their 1928 Conference towards the empowering women poets of the 19th century, namely Al-Yazigi's works, and especially her poem dedicated to Al-Turk.

== See also ==
- 19th century poets
- The Arab Awakening
