= Nadine El-Enany =

English legal scholar

Nadine El-Enany is a writer and legal scholar. She is Professor of Law at Kent Law School, University of Kent. She specializes in migration and refugee law, European Union law, protest and criminal law.

== Life ==
Nadine El-Enany is the daughter of the Egyptian literary scholar Rasheed El-Enany. She gained her PhD, on refugee law in the United Kingdom and the European Union, in 2012 from the European University Institute in Italy.

After Grenfell (2019) was a co-edited collection of responses to the Grenfell Tower fire, emphasising the legacy of colonialism and UK immigration policy in explaining the racialized neglect of Grenfell residents. Bordering Britain (2020) argues that contemporary UK immigration law and policy need to be seen as "ongoing expressions of empire [...] an attempt to control access to the spoils of empire which are located in Britain".

El-Enany has also written for non-academic media outlets, including the London Review of Books and The Guardian.

Her collection of poetry Pelican Daughter won the James Berry Poetry Prize 2024.

== Works ==
- (ed. with Dan Bulley and Jenny Edkins) After Grenfell : violence, resistance and response, 2019
- Bordering Britain: law, race and empire. Manchester: Manchester University Press, 2020.
- Pelican Daughter. Hexham: Bloodaxe Books, 2026.
