= Heghnar Zeitlian Watenpaugh =

American historian (born 1969)

- Born: October 1969 (age 56–57); Beirut, Lebanon
- Occupation: Historian
- Spouse: Keith David Watenpaugh
- Parent: Sarkis Zeitlian (father)

Academic background
- Education: University of California, Los Angeles

Academic work
- Discipline: Architectural and urban history
- Sub-discipline: Middle Eastern visual culture
- Institutions: UC Davis College of Letters and Science; Massachusetts Institute of Technology; Rice University

Heghnar Zeitlian Watenpaugh is an American historian. A native of Lebanon, she specializes in Middle Eastern visual culture and wrote the books The Image of an Ottoman City (2004) and The Missing Pages (2019). Watenpaugh is a Professor of Art History at the University of California, Davis.

== Biography ==
Watenpaugh, an ethnic Armenian, was born in Beirut, the capital and largest city of Lebanon. Her ancestors moved to that country and to Egypt after the Armenian genocide, which she described as "part of [her] history". Her father, Sarkis Zeitlian, was an Armenian Revolutionary Federation leader. She studied at the Lebanese American University (where she obtained her AA in 1988) and at the University of California, Los Angeles (where she obtained her BA in 1990, her MA, and eventually her PhD in 1999). In 1998, she became an assistant professor at Rice University, where she remained until 2001, when she became the Aga Khan Career Development Professor at the Massachusetts Institute of Technology (MIT).

As an academic, she specializes in Middle Eastern visual culture, particularly the region's architectural and urban history. While working at MIT, she was made a 2003–2004 J. Paul Getty Trust Postdoctoral Fellow for her project "Ruins into Monuments: Preservation, Nationalism, and the Construction of Heritage in the Modern Middle East". In 2004, she wrote the 33rd volume of The Ottoman Empire and its Heritage multi-volume series, The Image of an Ottoman City, in which she discusses the architectural and urban history of the Syrian city of Aleppo. She won the Society of Architectural Historians' 2006 Spiro Kostof Book Award for that book. In 2006, she moved to the UC Davis College of Letters and Science, where she became Associate Professor of Art History. Her scholarly article, "Deviant Dervishes: Space, Gender and the Construction of Antinomian Piety in Ottoman Aleppo", won the 2007 Syrian Studies Association Article Prize for "its meticulous reconstruction and careful analysis of the life and works of a prominent Sufi figure of the late sixteenth century, and for demonstrating the complex ways in which the memory and legacy of this figure were appropriated by the religious and political authorities in the years after his death". On April 24, 2015, Watenpaugh delivered a bilingual Armenian-Turkish speech at an event at Taksim Square commemorating the 100th anniversary of the Armenian genocide.

In 2019, she wrote The Missing Pages, a historical study of the separated canon tables of the Zeytun Gospels and how they eventually reached the J. Paul Getty Museum after the Armenian genocide. She had come up with the idea for the book after writing a Los Angeles Times op-ed in response to the Armenian Apostolic Church's lawsuit over the Zeytun Gospels. She won several awards for that book – the Society for Armenian Studies' 2019 Der Mugrdechian Outstanding Book Award, one of two 2020 Independent Publisher Book Awards Gold Medals in World History, and the 2020 Ottoman and Turkish Studies Association Book Prize. – and the book was one of fifteen shortlisted entries for the 2019 William Saroyan International Prize for Writing in Non-Fiction.

She was appointed as a Guggenheim Fellow in 2020. In that same year, she was made a National Endowment for the Humanities Public Scholar for her project "City of 1001 Churches: Architecture, Destruction, and Preservation at a World Heritage Site".

Her husband, Keith David Watenpaugh, is a historian and also a professor at the University of California, Davis.

== Publications ==
- The Image of an Ottoman City (2004)
- The Missing Pages (2019)
