= Rasheed El-Enany =

Egyptian literary scholar (born 1949)

- Born: July 17, 1949 (age 76)
- Citizenship: Egypt
- Occupations: Literary critic; Writer

Rasheed El-Enany (Arabic: رشيد العناني; born 1949) is an Egyptian literary scholar, who specializes in modern Arabic literature. He is Professor of Arabic and Comparative Literature, and Dean of Social Sciences and Humanities at the Doha Institute for Graduate Studies. He is also Professor Emeritus at the University of Exeter.

An expert on the novels of Naguib Mahfouz, he delivered the Mahfouz Memorial Lecture at the American University in Cairo in 2009.

His daughter is the legal scholar Nadine El-Enany.

== Works ==
- Naguib Mahfouz: the pursuit of meaning. London, New York: Routledge, 1993.
- Arab representations of the Occident: east-west encounters in Arab fiction. London, New York: Routledge, 2005
- Naguib Mahfouz: his life and thought. 2007.
- (tr.) Tales of encounter: three Egyptian novellas by Yusuf Idris. Cairo, Egypt: The American University in Cairo Press, 2012.
