= Khalil Hawi =

Lebanese poet (1919–1982)

Khalil Hawi (Arabic: خليل حاوي; Transliterated Khalīl Ḥāwī; 1919–1982) was a Lebanese poet and writer who was one of Lebanon's most prominent poets in the 20th century. In 1982, during the 1982 Lebanon War, that occurred in the midst of the Lebanese Civil War, Hawi committed suicide by a self-inflicted gunshot wound from a rifle in his apartment in Beirut, driven by his profound despondency over his country's inability and failure to defend itself from the onslaught of the Israeli invasion, when the latter invaded Lebanon on 6 June 1982.

He also vehemently resented the silence and inaction of other Arab countries' governments about the 1982 Israeli invasion of Lebanon, which contributed to his suicide as well.

Throughout his career and lifetime, he wrote five anthologies of poetry and regularly contributed to literary magazines such as Majallat Shiʿr ("Poetry Magazine").

== List of works ==
Khalil Hawi wrote five anthologies of poetry.

- River of Ash (1957)
- Flute and Wind (1961)
- Threshing Floor's of Hunger (1965)
- Wounded Thunder (1979)
- From Hell's Comedy (1979)
