= Catholic–Orthodox clash in Aleppo (1818) =

Religious conflict

The Catholic–Orthodox clash in Aleppo occurred in 1818, when Aleppo was part of the Ottoman Empire, between Catholic and Orthodox Christians. In the midst of the violence, the wali's troops killed nine Catholic Melkites, one Syriac Catholic, and one Maronite. According to Hidemitsu Kuroki, a researcher at Tokyo University, the clash was "a symbolic moment in the last phase" of "the process of the separation and establishment of the millet of Catholic Melchites", which "is considered to have been the catalyst for the emergence of the modern millet system in the Ottoman Empire."

== Sources ==
- Charon, Cyrille (1903). "L'Église grecque melchite catholique (Suite.)". Revue des études byzantines (in French). 6 (39): 113–118.
- Kuroki, Hidemitsu (1993). "The Orthodox-Catholic Clash in Aleppo in 1818". Orient. 29: 1–18. doi:10.5356/orient1960.29.1.
