= Keith David Watenpaugh =

American academic (born 1966)

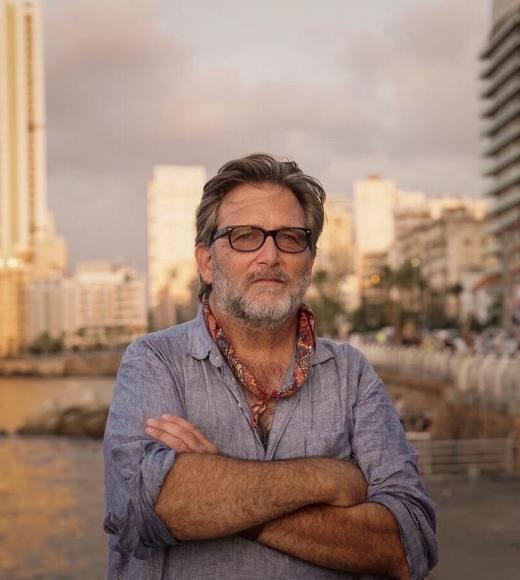
- Keith David Watenpaugh in 2018
- Born: 8 October 1966 (age 59); United States
- Spouse: Heghnar Zeitlian Watenpaugh
- Awards: Institute of International Education Centennial Medal, Richard von Weizsäcker Distinguished Visitor and Lecturer fellowship
- Scientific career
- Fields: Human Rights, Religious Studies, Genocide
- Workplaces: University of California, Davis

Keith David Watenpaugh (born October 8, 1966) is an American academic. He is Professor of Human Rights Studies at the University of California, Davis. A leading American historian of the contemporary Middle East, human rights, and modern humanitarianism, he is an expert on the Armenian genocide and its denial, and the role of the refugee in world history.

Watenpaugh is the founding director of the UC Davis Human Rights Studies Program, the first academic program of its kind in the University of California system. He has been a leader of international efforts to address the needs of displaced and refugee university students and professionals, primarily those affected by the wars and civil conflicts in Syria, Iraq, and Turkey.

He serves on the academic advisory board of the National Center for Free Speech and Civic Engagement; and is a founding steering committee member of the University Alliance for Refugees and At-Risk Migrants

== Works ==
In addition to publishing in The American Historical Review, the International Journal of Middle East Studies, Journal of Human Rights, Humanity, Social History, The Huffington Post and the Chronicle of Higher Education, Watenpaugh is author of Being Modern in the Middle East: Revolution, Nationalism, and Colonialism and the Arab Middle Class (Princeton: Princeton University Press 2006) and Bread from Stones: The Middle East and the Making of Modern Humanitarianism (Oakland: University of California Press, 2015).

He is co-editor of Karnig Panian's Goodbye, Antoura: A Memoir of the Armenian Genocide (Palo Alto: Stanford University Press, 2015). Panian was an Armenian Genocide child survivor who was held in the Ottoman orphanage at Antoura, Lebanon, where he was subjected to violent attempts at Turkification.

== Refugee university students and scholars ==
Following the 2003 American-led invasion and occupation of Iraq, he led the first investigation of conditions facing universities and research centers in Baghdad. His team's findings appear in "Opening Doors: Academic Conditions and Intellectual Life in Post-War Baghdad," which was highly critical of early American cultural and education policies in post-invasion Iraq, especially those adopted by the Coalition Provisional Authority.

Since 2013, Watenpaugh has directed a joint University of California, Davis Global Affairs and Human Rights Studies project to assist refugee university students and scholars from the war in Syria. The project has documented how refugee higher education is neglected by traditional governmental and intergovernmental refugee agencies, and has proposed new methods and techniques for their assistance, including ways to increase their mobility.

With the support of the Ford Foundation and the Open Society Foundations (2017–2019), he directed the development and implementation of the Article 26 Backpack, a digital tool that improves refugee academic document security and empowers better access to higher education opportunities.

== Awards and honors ==
Watenpaugh is a recipient (2019) of the Institute of International Education Centennial Medal in recognition of his research, advocacy, and the Article 26 Backpack.

He has been a Fellow of the American Council of Learned Societies (2013), a Senior Fellow in International Peace at the United States Institute of Peace (2008–2009) and has served on the editorial board of the International Journal of Middle East Studies.

In 2018 he held the Richard von Weizsäcker Distinguished Visitor and Lecturer fellowship at the American Academy in Berlin; distinguished research fellow (2018) of the Issam Fares Institute for Public Policy and International Affairs at American University of Beirut; distinguished visiting professor (2016) at The Strassler Family Center for Holocaust and Genocide Studies, Clark University; and the George S. and Dolores Doré Eccles Distinguished Visiting Fellow at the Tanner Humanities Center, University of Utah (2005–2006).

He has also had the Fulbright, Fulbright-Hays, Social Science Research Council, Will Rogers and the American Academic Research Institute in Iraq fellowships; he was the Andrew W. Mellon Foundation Post-Doctoral Fellow in Middle East Studies at Williams College from 1998 to 2000.

His scholarship has won multiple awards from professional organizations. His most recent book, Bread from Stones, is an Ahmanson Foundation Book in the Humanities; and won honorable mention (2016) in the Pacific Coast Branch of the American Historical Association Norris & Carol Hundley Award competition.

Watenpaugh is an Eagle Scout.

== Personal life ==
His wife, Heghnar Zeitlian Watenpaugh, is also a historian and a professor at UC Davis.

== Selected publications and interviews ==
Bread From Stones: The Middle East and the Making of Modern Humanitarianism (Oakland: University of California Press, 2015)

Being Modern in the Middle East: Revolution, Colonialism, Nationalism and the Arab Middle Class, (Princeton: Princeton University Press, 2006.)

"The League of Nations' Rescue of Armenian Genocide Survivors and the Making of Modern Humanitarianism, 1920-1927," American Historical Review, 115:5, (December 2010).

"Syria's Lost Generation" Chronicle of Higher Education, (June, 2013).

"The Article 26 Backpack Digital Platform Empowers Refugee Students," IIE Networker (Spring 2018)

"A Matter of Rights Professor shares his efforts to help refugees access higher education" University of California News

"We Will Stop Here and Go No Further: Syrian University Students and Scholars in Turkey" (2014)

Ottoman History Podcast, Syrian University Students and the Impacts of War (2014)

Ottoman History Podcast Interview with Chris Gratien The Middle East in the Making of Modern Humanitarianism (2015)

"Why Trump's Executive Order Is Wrongheaded and Reckless," Chronicle of Higher Education, (January, 2017)

"A Fragile Glasnost on the Tigris" Middle East Report 228: Fall 2003.

"Middle East Brain Drain," National Public Radio's Talk of the Nation - 11/22/2006
