= Niqula al-Turk =

Niqula bin Yusuf al-Turk (1763–1828) was a scholar, historian, and poet at the court of Amir Bashir Shihab II. He was born in Dayr al-Qamar (in modern-day Lebanon). Of Greek descent, he accompanied Napoleon's expedition in Egypt and wrote an account of it, which was translated in French by Desgranges as Histoire de l'expédition des Français en Égypte (published in 1839). Gaston Wiet has published his memoirs as Chronique d'Égypte, 1798–1804. Al-Turk died, blind, in Dayr al-Qamar.

His daughter, Warda al Turk (1797–1873), was also a poet.

== Sources ==
- Goldschmidt, Arthur (2000). Biographical Dictionary of Modern Egypt. Rienner. ISBN 978-1555872298.
- Jayyusi, Salma Khadra (1977). Trends and Movements in Modern Arabic Poetry. Brill. ISBN 978-9004049208.
