= Al-Jinan (magazine) =

Political and literary magazine in Beirut (1870–1886)

- Categories: Political magazine; Literary magazine
- Frequency: Bi-weekly
- Founder: Butrus al-Bustani
- First issue: January 1870
- Final issue: 1886
- Country: Ottoman Empire
- Based in: Beirut
- Language: Arabic

Al-Jinan (Arabic: الجنان, romanized: al-Jinān, lit. 'The Gardens') was an Arabic-language political and literary biweekly magazine established in Beirut by Butrus al-Bustani and active between 1870 and 1886. Its first issue appeared in January 1870. Written largely by Butrus' son Salim, who became its editor-in-chief in 1871, the magazine finally ceased to appear because of the growing difficulties of writing freely in the Ottoman Empire under the rule of Sultan Abdülhamid.

== Profile ==
Al-Jinan had a pan-Arab political stance. It was the first significant example of the kind of literary and scientific periodicals which began to appear in the 1870s in Arabic alongside the independent political newspapers. The magazine was also one of the earliest Arabic magazines which covered narrative fiction such as novels, novellas and short stories. One of the novels serialized in the magazine was Salim Butrus' historical novel Passion during the Conquests of Syria (Arabic: الهيام في فتوح الشام, romanized: Al-Ḥayām fī Futūḥ al-Shām, 1884), which is about the 634–8 Muslim conquest of the Levant.

Al-Jinan was issued by subscription only, and was not sold in bookstores. In the initial phase the readers sent their subscriptions by post to Beirut. Following its success local agents were employed to collect subscriptions in the cities, including Baghdad, Basra, Cairo, Alexandria, Aleppo, Assiut, Casablanca, Tangier, London, Paris and Berlin. Three years after its start Al-Jinan had nearly 1500 subscribers. The magazine's readers included the leading Muslim merchant families in Beirut. It also had readers in Palestine.

The issues of Al-Jinan are archived at Al-Aqsa Library in Jerusalem.
