= Geert Jan van Gelder =

Dutch academic

Gerard Jan Henk van Gelder FBA (born 10 June 1947) is a Dutch academic who was the Laudian Professor of Arabic at the University of Oxford from 1998 to 2012.

== Life ==
After completing his secondary education at the Vossius Gymnasium Amsterdam, Van Gelder studied at the University of Amsterdam, then worked as Librarian at the Institute for the Modern Near East at the university from 1973 to 1975. He was lecturer in Arabic at the University of Groningen from 1975 to 1998, gaining a doctorate from the University of Leiden in 1982.

During the 1980s and beginning of the 1990s, van Gelder was one of the so-called 'Cambridge Symposiasts', who gathered in odd-numbered years to discuss Classical Arabic poetry, particularly of the pre-Islamic and early Islamic periods; other participants included John Mattock, Renate Jacobi, James Montgomery, Thomas Bauer, and Arie Schippers. Van Gelder was appointed as a member of the Royal Netherlands Academy of Arts and Sciences in 1994. He moved to the University of Oxford in 1998 to take up the position of Laudian Professor of Arabic, becoming a Fellow of St John's College, Oxford. He became a Fellow of the British Academy in 2005. His publications include Beyond the Line: classical Arabic literary critics on the coherence and unity of the poem (1982) and Close Relationships: incest and inbreeding in classical Arabic literature (2005).
