= Immigration to Mexico =

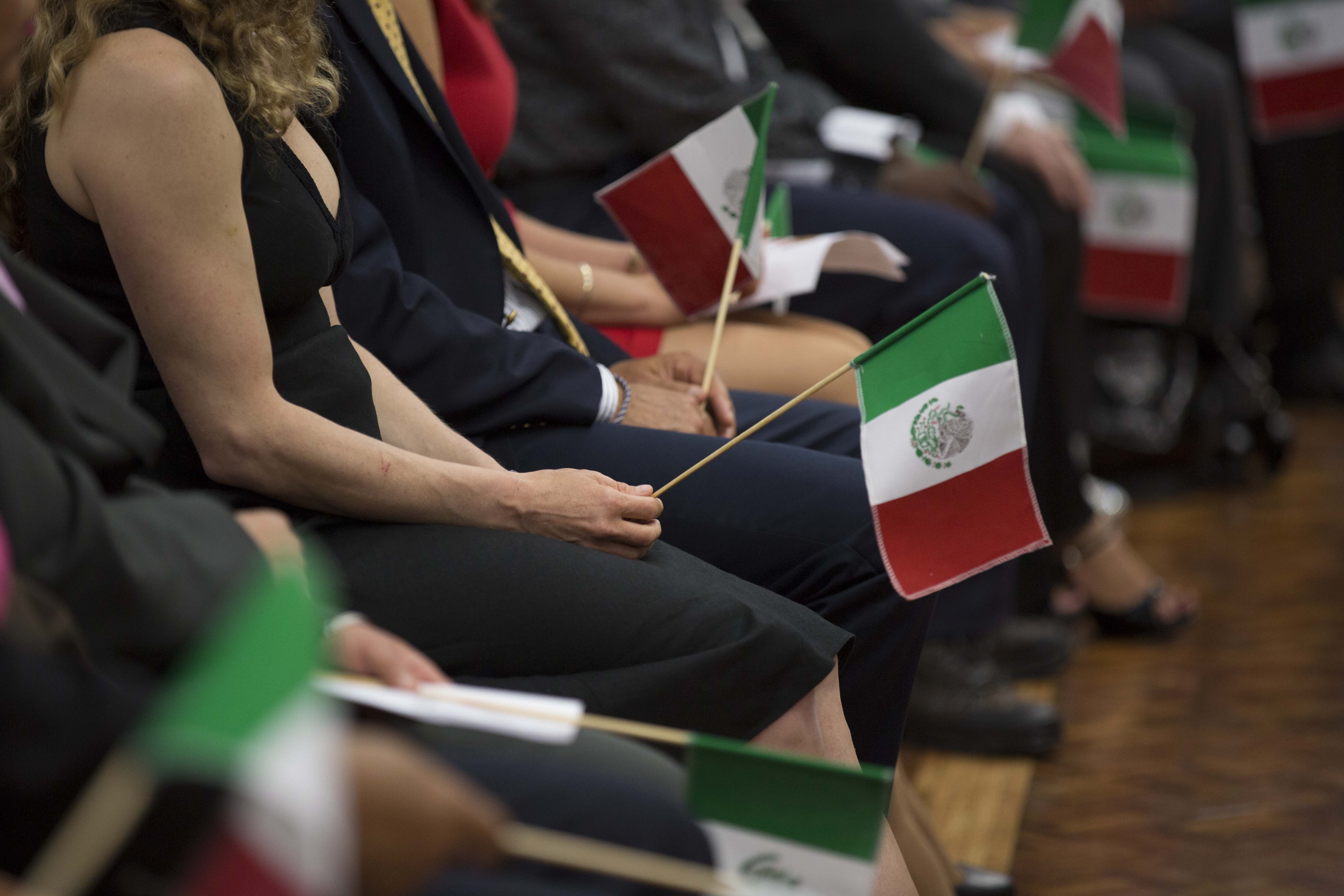
Immigrants at a naturalization ceremony in Los Pinos

Immigration to Mexico has been important in shaping the country's demographics. Since the arrival of the Spanish in the early 16th century, Mexico has received immigrants from Europe, Africa, Asia, and other parts of the Americas. Foreigners have stayed throughout Mexican territory for various reasons, including its geographical position, social, economic, climatological, cultural, and transit reasons. Today, millions of these immigrants and their descendants still live in Mexico and can be found throughout the country, working in different professions and industries.

According to the 2020 National Census, there are 1,212,252 foreign-born people registered living in Mexico. Around 65% of this population come from the United States, with notable amounts from Guatemala and Venezuela, as well as Colombian, Honduran, Cuban, Spanish, Salvadorian, and Argentinian communities. Remaining immigrant populations come from non-Hispanic nations.

Article 11 of the Mexican Constitution states:

Every man has the right to enter the Republic, leave it, travel through its territory and change residence, without the need for a security letter, passport, safe-conduct or other similar requirements. The exercise of this right will be subordinate to the powers of the judicial authority, in cases of criminal or civil liability, and those of the administrative authority, as regards the limitations imposed by the laws on emigration, immigration, and general health of the Republic, or on pernicious foreigners residing in the country.

Both Articles 9 and 33 of the Constitution limit foreigners' meddling in the country's political affairs, by reserving political power to citizens, and reserving the executive’s right to deport foreign individuals whose presence it deems inconvenient without the need of a trial respectively.

The Constitution grants foreigners the same guarantees as nationals and are therefore protected by the provisions of Article 4 ensuring the equality of men and women, and Article 1 prohibiting any discrimination based on ethnic or national origin, gender, age, disabilities, social status, health conditions, religion, opinions, preferences, civil status, or any other status that violates human dignity and aims to nullify or impair the rights and freedoms of people.

Article 133 of the Constitution dictate that international treaties signed by the president and ratified by the Senate will be the supreme law of the entire union. Mexico is part of various international treaties that ensure and protect various migrant rights, such as the American Convention on Human Rights and United Nations Convention on Migrant Workers, which broadly stipulates their rights and the corpus juris for the protection of the rights of women and girls.

In the 20th century, Mexico served as a country of refuge, in particular accepting individuals fleeing World War II in Europe and the Middle East, the Arab-Israeli Conflict, Spanish Civil War, Guatemalan Civil War, and Nicaraguan Revolution. Contemporary immigration in Mexico has not had an overwhelming impact on the total population, but there has been a considerable increase in the foreign population since Mexico’s consolidation as an independent nation.

Historically, Mexico has not sought mass immigration, but rather focused on more selective immigration, such as political asylum for religious or ideological persecution; many intellectuals, scientists, and artists who reside in Mexico come from other nations and contribute in various scientific and artistic fields.

== History ==
=== Colonial era, 1521–1821 ===
Mesoamerica and Ardioamerica, the regions encompassing all of modern-day Mexico, already had a large indigenous population prior to European contact in the early sixteenth century. The Spanish Conquest of Latin America shaped migration patterns to the colony of New Spain. The Spanish crown restricted immigration to its overseas possessions to Catholics with "pure" ancestry (limpieza de sangre), that is, without the taint of Jewish or Muslim ancestors. Prospective immigrants had to obtain a license from the House of Trade in Seville, Spain, attesting to their religious status and ancestry. So-called New Christians, that is Jewish converts to Catholicism, were forbidden from immigrating for fear they had falsely claimed conversion and were in fact crypto-Jews passing as Christians. During the period when Spain and Portugal had the same monarch (1580–1640), many Portuguese merchants immigrated to Mexico. Religious authorities suspected they were crypto-Jews. The Mexican Inquisition was established in 1571 and arrested, tried, and then turned those convicted over to civil authorities for corporal, sometimes capital, punishment in autos de fe.

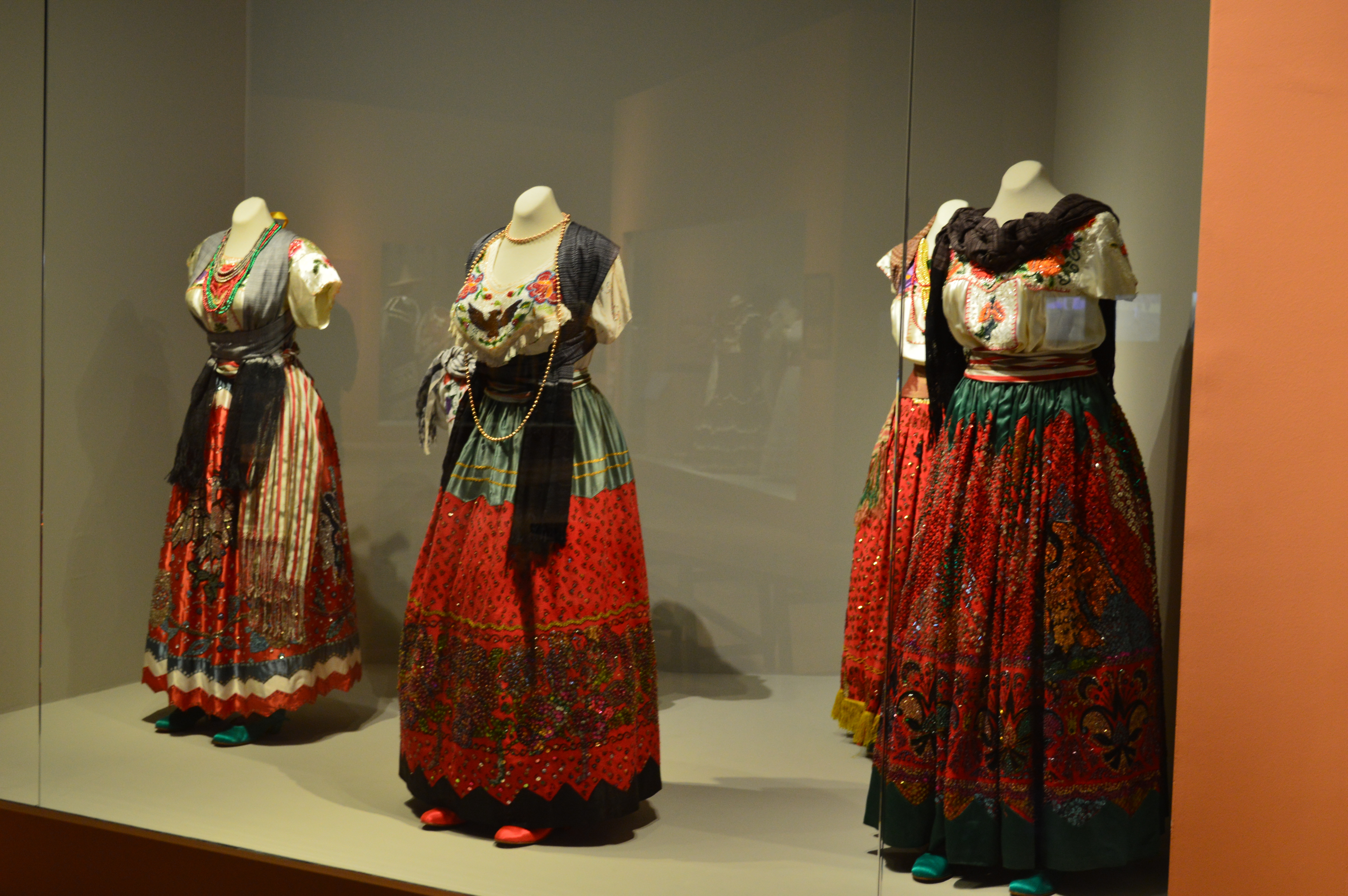
Traditional china poblana attire for women, attributed to Mirra (Catarina de San Juan), a slave brought to Mexico from Kochi, India in the 17th century

Early Spanish immigrants to Mexico included men who became crown or ecclesiastical officials, those with connections to the privileged group of conquerors who had access to indigenous labor and tribute via the encomienda, but also Spaniards who saw economic opportunity in Mexico. Not all Spaniards were of noble heritage (hidalgos); many were merchants and miners, as well as artisans of various types. Very few Spanish women immigrated from the conquest era onward, most usually because they joined family members who had already immigrated. Their presence helped consolidate the Spanish colony. Spaniards founded cities, sometimes on the sites of indigenous cities, the most prominent being Mexico City founded on the ruins of Aztec Tenochtitlan. Spaniards preferred living in cities and with immigrant artisans present from an early period, Spanish material culture was replicated in Mexico by tailors, leatherworkers, bakers, makers of weapons, construction workers, booksellers, and medical specialists (barber-surgeons). In 1550, of the 8,000 Spanish immigrants in Mexico City, around ten percent were artisans. Some large-scale overseas traders based in Spain also had family members in charge of a business in Mexico itself. A few particular towns in Spain sent immigrants to particular towns in Mexico, a notable example being Brihuega, Spain and Puebla, New Spain's second-largest town, both of which were textile-producing towns.

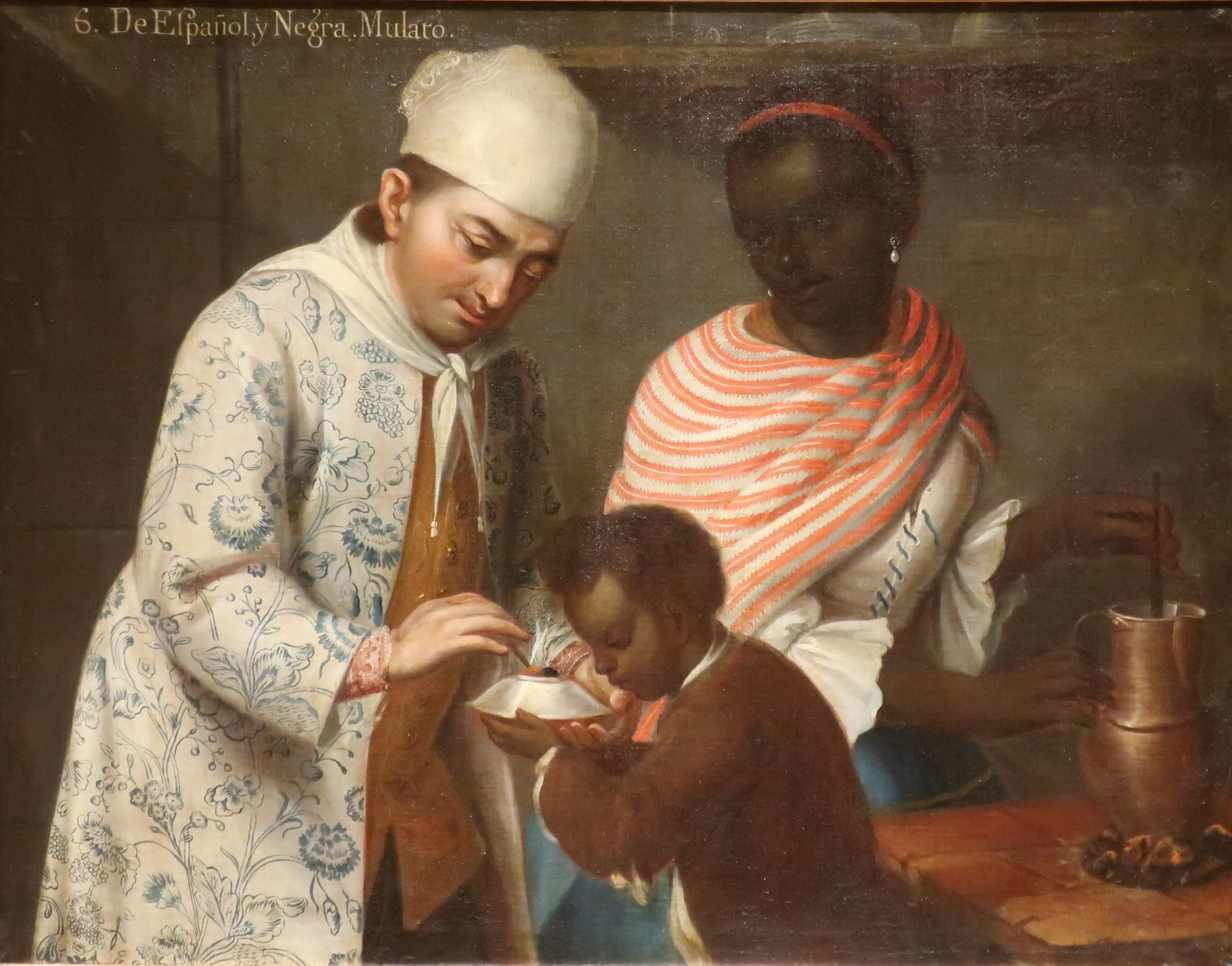
18th century Casta painting, depicting a West African-Spanish family in colonial Mexico

African slaves were brought as auxiliaries to Spanish conquerors and settlers from the Spanish conquest onward, but as enslaved persons, they were different from European voluntary immigration. Because Mexico had such a dense indigenous population, Spaniards imported fewer African slaves than they did to the Caribbean, where sugar cultivation necessitated a large labor force and indigenous laborers were absent.

Although most European immigrants were from various regions of Spain, there were Europeans with other origins including Italians, Flemish (most prominently Pedro de Gante), Greeks, French, and a few Irish (including William Lamport). Except for the Portuguese, many of these other Europeans assimilated into the larger Hispanic society. Seventeenth-century English Dominican friar Thomas Gage spent a few years in central Mexico and Guatemala and wrote a colorful memoir of his time there, but returned to England and renounced Catholicism. Asians arrived in Mexico via the Manila Galleon and the Pacific coast port of Acapulco. Filipinos, Chinese, and Japanese were part of this first wave, many of them enslaved. The most famous of them was Catarina de San Juan, "la china poblana" (an Asian woman of Puebla), a slave woman who might have been of Mughal origin.

=== Post-independence, 1821–1920 ===
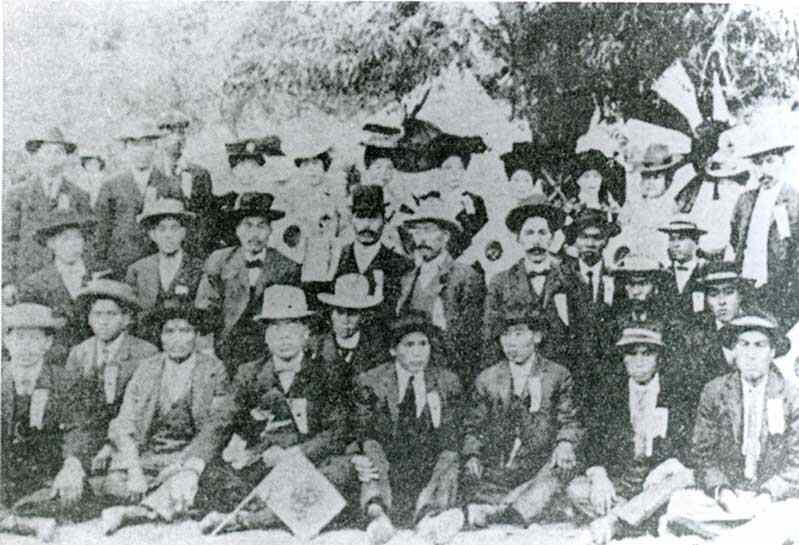
Japanese immigrant workers at the mine of Cananea, Sonora in the 1910s. The Japanese, unlike other Asian immigrants, came from a politically strong nation and were seen as industrious, so they were exempt from the discriminatory immigration policies.

Even after Mexico achieved independence from Spain in 1821, it continued to exclude non-Catholics from immigrating until the liberal Reform. After the fall of the monarchy of Agustín de Iturbide in 1823, the newly established federal republic promulgated a new law regarding immigration, the General Colonization Law. The Spanish Crown's controls over foreigners doing business in Mexico were no longer in place, and some British businessmen took an interest in silver mining in northern Mexico. The Mexican government sought to populate areas of the north as a buffer against indigenous attacks. The Mexican government gave a license to Stephen F. Austin to colonize areas in Texas, with the proviso that they be or become Catholics and learn Spanish, largely honored in the breach as more and more settlers arrived. Most settlers were from the slave-holding areas of the southern U.S. and brought their slaves with them to cultivate the rich soil of east Texas. The experiment in colonization in Texas went disastrously wrong for Mexico, with Anglo-Texans and some Mexican Texians rebelling against Mexico's central government and gaining de facto independence in 1836. However, Mexicans of various ideological stripes called for attracting immigrants to Mexico in the nineteenth century.

In the immediate aftermath of the American Civil War (1861–1865), a number of Southerners from the failed Confederate States of America moved to Mexico. Another group migrating to Mexico were Mormons, who sought religious freedom to practice polygamy, and founded colonies in northern Mexico. Many Mormons left Mexico at the outbreak of the Mexican Revolution.

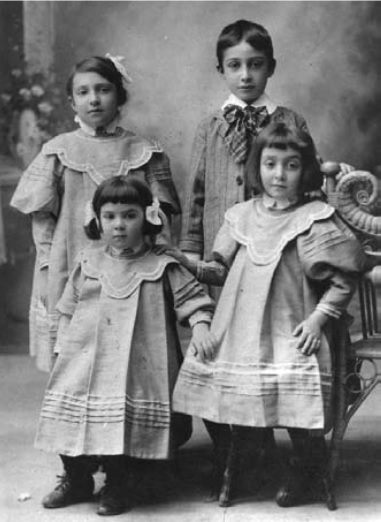
Second generation Armenian Mexican children in 1911

During the late nineteenth century when Mexican President Porfirio Díaz (r. 1876–1880, 1884–1911) pursued a policy of modernization and development, many from the U.S. settled in Mexico, pursuing roles as financiers, industrialists, investors, and agri-business investors, and farmers. Some did assimilate culturally, learning Spanish and sometimes marrying into elite Mexican families, but many others kept a separate identity and U.S. citizenship. British, French, and German immigrants also became distinct immigrant groups during the Porfiriato.

Mass Chinese immigration to Mexico began in the 1876, following mass single-male migrations to Cuba and to Peru, where they worked as field laborers coolies. Chinese men immigrated mainly to northern Mexico, and the flow of migration increased following the passage of the 1882 Chinese Exclusion Act in the U.S. Some then entered the U.S. illegally, but many more stayed in the borderlands area on the Mexican side, where they entered commerce as entrepreneurs of small-scale businesses, creating dry-goods stores and laundries in mining and agricultural towns, as well as small-scale manufacturing and truck farming. They came to monopolize the small-business sector. Chinese merchant houses were established in Pacific coast ports, such as Guaymas, hiring their country-men. There was significant anti-Chinese feeling in northern Mexico, which intensified during the Mexican Revolution. They were expelled from Sonora in the 1930s and their businesses nationalized.

== Immigration policy ==
With the Mexican government's intent to control migration flows and attract foreigners who can contribute to economic development, the new migration law simplifies foreigners' entrance and residency requirements. It replaces the two large immigration categories of immigrant and nonimmigrant with the categories of "visitor" and "temporary resident", while keeping the status of "permanent resident". In the General Law of Population, the two categories incorporate over 30 different types of foreigners, i.e., distinguished visitor, religious minister, etc., each with its own stipulations and requirements to qualify for entry and remain in the country. Under the new law the requirements are simplified, basically differentiating those foreigners who are allowed to work and those who are not. The law also expedites the permanent resident application process for retirees and other foreigners. For granting permanent residency, the law proposes using a point system based on factors such as level of education, employment experience, and scientific and technological knowledge.

According to Article 81 of the Law and Article 70 of the regulations to the law, published on 28 September 2012, immigration officials are the only ones that can conduct immigration procedures, although the Federal Police may assist, but only under the request and guidance of the Institute of Migration. Verification procedures cannot be conducted in migrant shelters run by civil society organizations or by individuals that engage in providing humanitarian assistance to immigrants.

Undocumented immigration has been a problem for Mexico, especially since the 1970s. Although the number of deportations is declining with 61,034 registered cases in 2011, the Mexican government documented over 200,000 unauthorized border crossings in 2004 and 2005. In 2011, 93% of undocumented immigrants in Mexico came from three countries in Central America-Guatemala, Honduras and El Salvador- however, there is an increasing number of immigrants from Asia and Africa.

In 2024, Mexican authorities recorded more than 1.2 million cases of unauthorized migration. According to data from the first five months of the year, the largest groups came from Venezuela, Guatemala, Honduras, Ecuador, Haiti, Colombia, El Salvador, Nicaragua, Peru, and Cuba. The government tightened migration controls, restricting access to transit documents, moving migrants from northern to southern Mexico and deploying 10,000 additional National Guard troops to the country's borders in February 2025. The number of undocumented migrants registered by Mexican authorities fell by 87% in 2025 compared with 2024, while many migrants, including Venezuelans, remained stranded in southern Mexico.

=== History of immigration policy ===
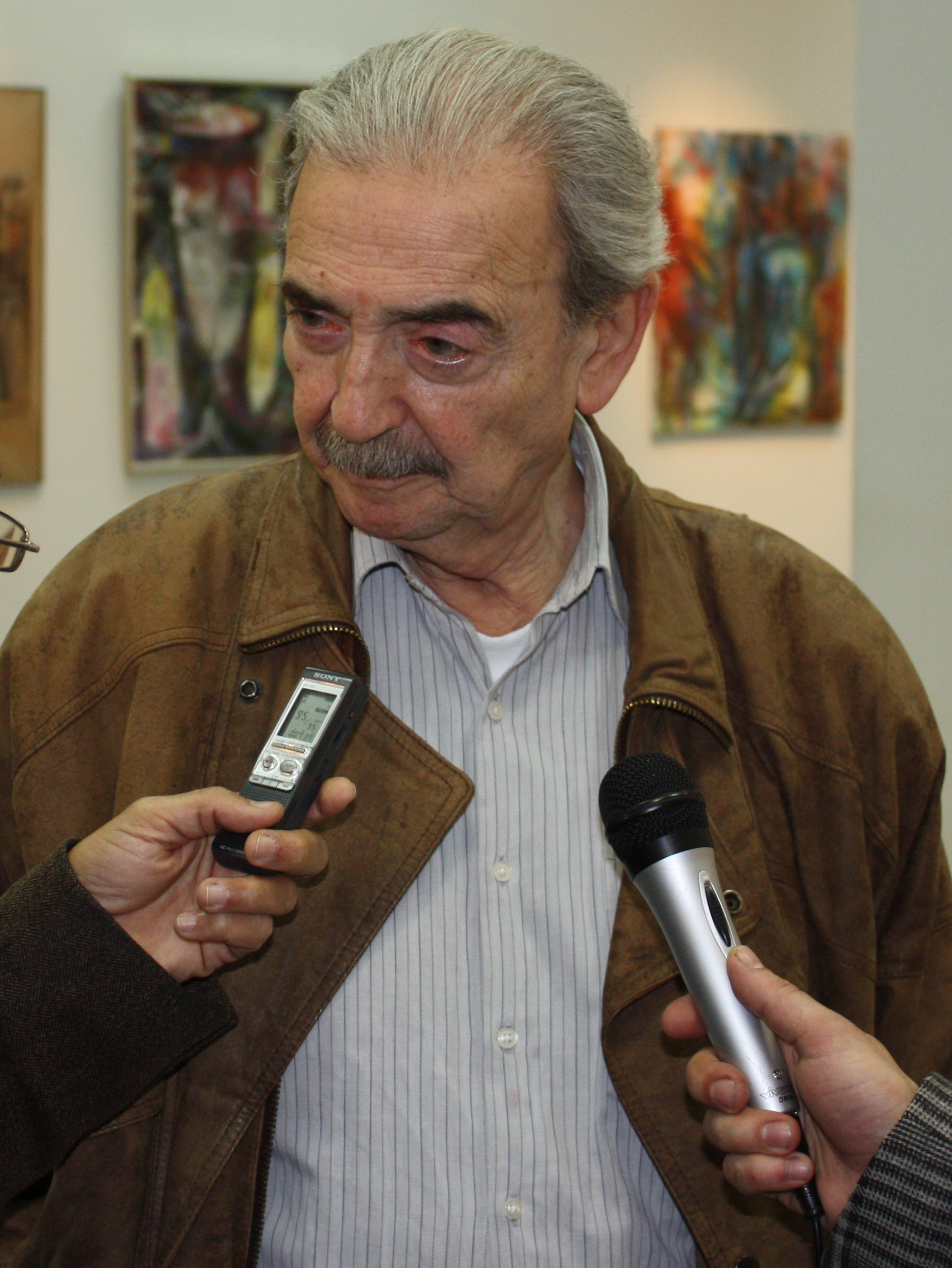
Juan Gelman Argentine poet and political activist who sought refuge in Mexico during Argentina's Dirty War

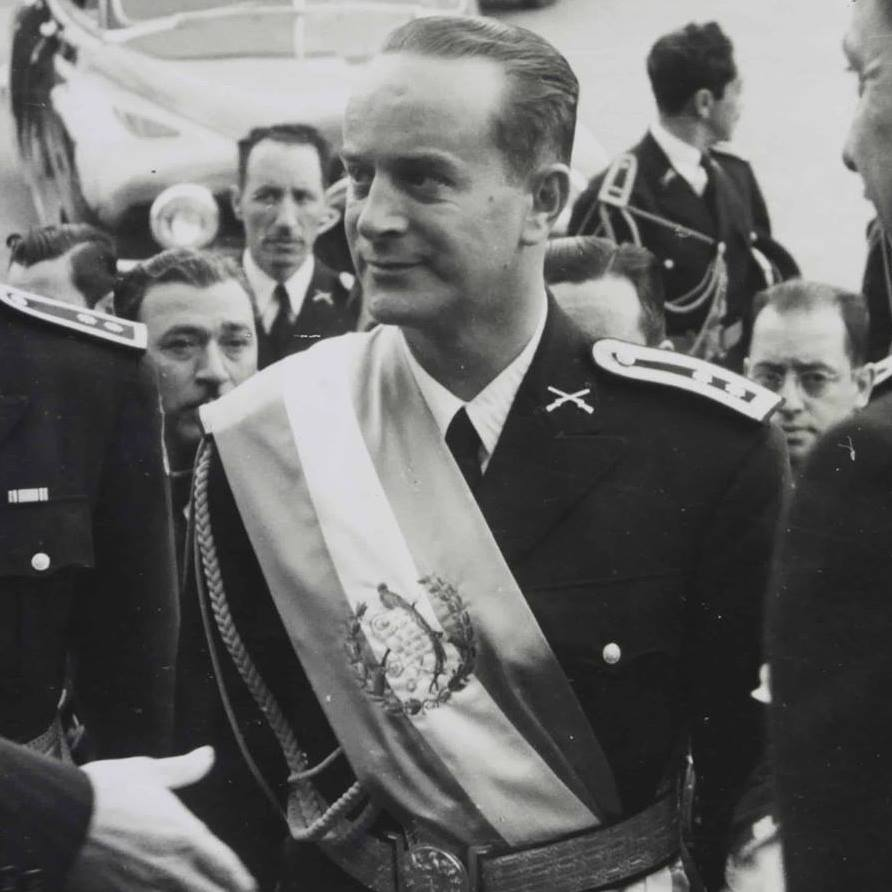
Jacobo Árbenz, 25th President of Guatemala, was exiled following the CIA-backed 1954 coup d'état and died in Mexico City in 1971.

Overview of Mexican immigration policy in regards to ethnicity or nationality:

- 1823 – Permanent settlement and naturalization is restricted to Catholics (see also General Colonization Law)
- 1860 – Catholic favoritism ends with the establishment of freedom of religion
- 1909 – First comprehensive immigration law rejects racial discrimination (enacted under the Porfirian regime, but ignored by the governments that followed the Mexican Revolution)
- 1917 – Shorter naturalization times for Latin Americans
- 1921 – Confidential circular, followed by an accord between China and Mexico, restricts Chinese immigration
- 1923 – Confidential circular excludes South Asian Indians (these confidential circulars were kept secretive in order to avoid diplomatic problems, such as with the British Empire or the United States)
- 1924 – Confidential circular excludes blacks (in practice, it excluded working class Afro-Latin Americans, but not elites)
- 1926 – Confidential circular excludes gypsies
- 1926 – Exclusion of those who "constitute a danger of physical degeneration for our race" (see also Blanqueamiento and national policy)
- 1927 – Exclusion of Palestinians, Arabs, Syrians, Lebanese, Armenians and Turks
- 1929 – Confidential circular excludes Poles and Russians
- 1931 – Confidential circular excludes Hungarians
- 1933 – Exclusion or restrictions of blacks, Malays, Indians, the 'yellow race' (East Asians, except Japanese), Soviets, gypsies, Poles, Lithuanians, Czechs, Slovacks, Syrians, Lebanese, Palestinians, Armenians, Arabs and Turks.
- 1934 – Exclusion or restrictions extended to Aboriginals, Latvians, Bulgarians, Romanians, Persians, Yugoslavs, Greeks, Albanians, Afghans, Ethiopians, Algerians, Egyptians, Moroccans and Jews.
- 1937 – Quotas establishes unlimited immigration from the Americas and Spain; 5,000 annual slots for each of thirteen Western European nationalities and the Japanese; and 100 slots for nationals of each other country of the world.
- 1939 – Shorter naturalization times for Spaniards
- 1947 – Law rejects racial discrimination, but promotes a preference for "assimilable" foreigners
- 1974 – Law eliminates assimilability as a gauge for admission
- 1993 – Shorter naturalization times for Portuguese (granted to Latin Americans and Iberians due to historical and cultural connections; requires two years of residence instead of five)

=== Temporary Migrant Regularization Program ===
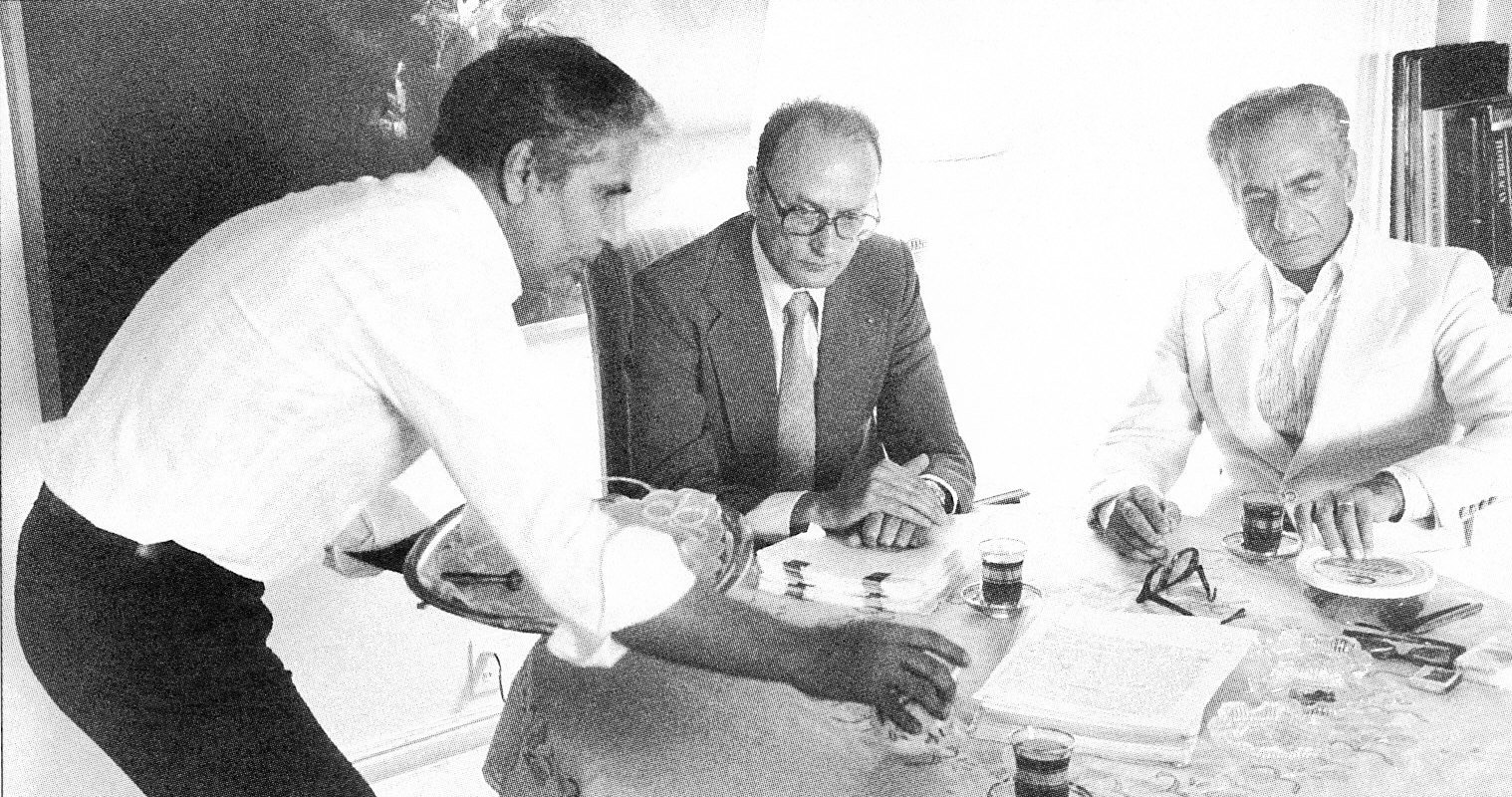
Mohammad Reza Pahlavi, last Shah of Iran, took refuge in Cuernavaca, Mexico after the Islamic Revolution of 1979.

The Programa Temporal de Regularización Migratoria (PTRM) published on 12 January 2015 in the Diario Oficial de la Federación, is directed at those foreigners who have made their permanent residence in Mexico but due to 'diverse circumstances' did not regularize their stay in the country and find themselves turning to 'third parties' to perform various procedures, including finding employment.

The program is aimed at foreign nationals who entered the country before 9 November 2012. Approved foreigners received through the PTRM the status of 'temporary resident', document valid for four years, and are eligible afterwards for permanent residency. The temporary program ran from 13 January to 18 December 2015.

In accordance with the provisions of Articles: 1, 2, 10, 18, 77, 126 and 133 of the Ley de Migración; 1 and 143 of the Reglamento de la Ley de Migración, any foreign national wishing to regularize their immigration status within Mexican territory, under the PTRM will complete the payment of fees for the following:

I. Proof of payment for receiving and examining the application of the procedure... ... MXN 1124.00 (USD 77.14 as of 12 January 2015)

II. For the issuance of the certificate giving them the status of temporary stay for four years ...... MXN 7914.00 (US$514.17)

Through Article 16 of the Ley Federal de Derechos, foreign national are exempt them from payment if it can be proven that they earn a wage at or below minimum wage. During the period that the PTRM is in effect, no fine is applied (as is the practice otherwise).

The PTRM was reenacted on 11 October 2016; eligibility was extended to undocumented migrants that entered the country before 9 January 2015. Migrants are assured that they will not be detained nor deported when inquiring for information or submitting their application at an INM office. Identification and proof of residency/entry date (such as bus or airplane tickets, utility bills, school records or expired visas) should be presented. If these proofs can not be provided, the legal testimony of two Mexicans/resident foreigners may also be accepted. The program runs until 19 December 2017.

== Public opinion ==
The 2019 survey found that 58% of Mexican respondents oppose immigration from Central America.

== Demographics ==
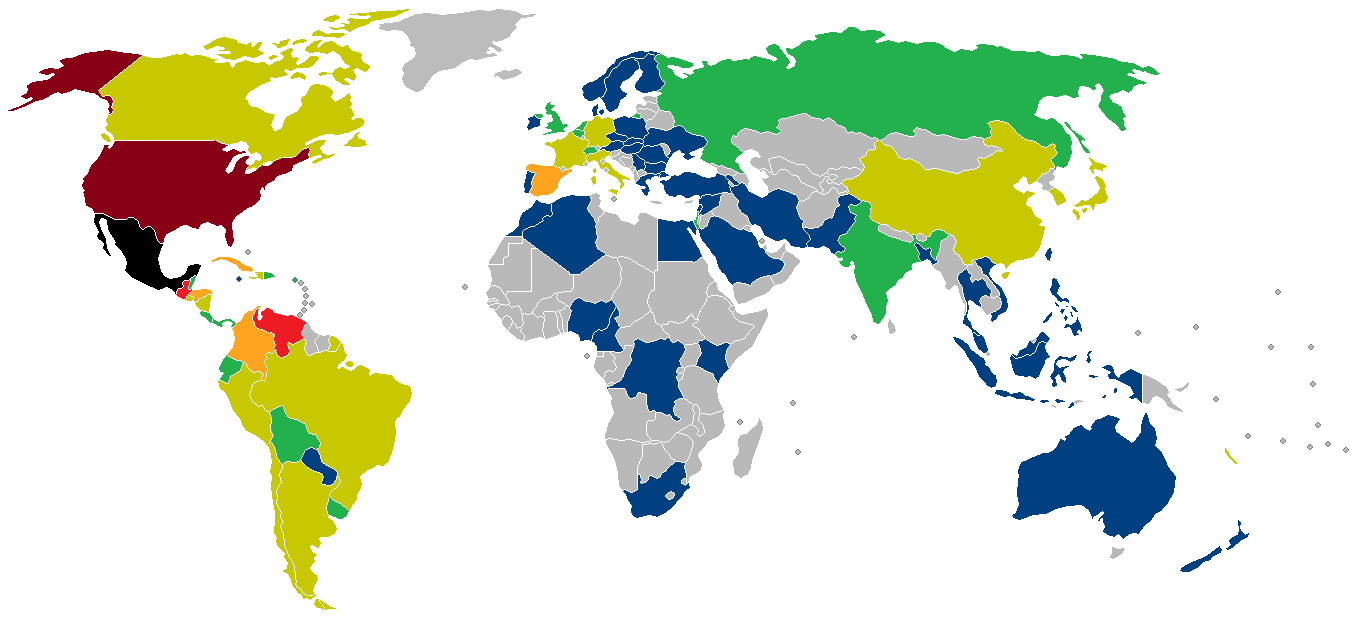
Foreign-born population of Mexico in 2020, by country of birth: >500,000 50,000–100,000 20,000–50,000 5,000–20,000 / 1,000–5,000 100–1,000

Most foreigners in Mexico counted in the Census come from the United States or other Hispanophone countries, with smaller numbers from Europe, East Asia, and the non-Hispanophone Americas. Their numbers have been rising as the country's economy develops, and now make up about 1% of the population.

=== Country of birth ===
Place	Country	2020	2010	Change %
1	United States	797,226	738,103	▲8.02%
2	Guatemala	56,810	35,322	▲60.83%
3	Venezuela	52,948	10,063	▲426.17%
4	Colombia	36,234	13,922	▲160.26%
5	Honduras	35,361	10,991	▲221.73%
6	Cuba	25,976	12,108	▲114.54%
7	Spain	20,763	18,873	▲10.01%
8	El Salvador	19,736	8,088	▲144.02%
9	Argentina	18,693	13,696	▲36.49%
10	Canada	12,439	7,943	▲56.60%
11	China	10,547	6,655	▲58.48%
12	France	9,080	7,163	▲26.76%
13	Brazil	8,689	4,532	▲91.73%
14	Peru	8,670	5,886	▲47.30%
15	Germany	6,860	6,214	▲10.40%
16	Italy	6,619	4,964	▲33.34%
17	Chile	6,532	5,267	▲24.02%
18	Haiti	5,895		
19	Nicaragua	5,731	3,572	▲60.44%
20	Japan	5,539	3,004	▲84.39%
21	South Korea	5,339	3,960	▲34.82%
22	United Kingdom	4,030		
23	Ecuador	3,995		
24	Costa Rica	3,803		
25	Dominican Republic	2,849		
26	Belize	2,813		
27	Uruguay	2,706		
28	India	2,656		
29	Bolivia	2,505		
30	Russia	2,321		
31	Panama	1,916		
32	Switzerland	1,439		
	Other countries	25,492		
TOTAL		1,212,252	961,121	▲26.13%
Source: INEGI (2020)

=== By region ===
Region	1990	2000	2010	2020
Africa	745	986	1,549	3,265
Americas	285,275	430,954	887,531	1,114,597
Asia	8,229	11,489	19,660	30,743
Europe	45,797	48,110	51,411	60,931
Oceania	200	821	556	699
Not Specified	578	257	414	2,017
Total	340,824	492,617	961,121	1,212,252

Source: INEGI Census

=== Documentation and condition of stay in Mexico ===
==== Temporary resident and permanent resident ====
Article 52 from the Mexican Immigration Laws establishes that foreigners may remain on national territory under the conditions of stay of visitor, temporary resident and permanent resident, provided that they comply with the requirements established with the law. With the Temporary Resident Card (TRT), in terms of Article 52, Section VII establishes the following:

Authorizes the foreigner to remain in the country for a period not exceeding four years, with the possibility of obtaining a permit to work in exchange for remuneration in the country, subject to an offer of employment with the right to enter and leave the national territory as many times as desired.

On the other hand, the Permanent Resident Card (TRP), in terms of Article 52, Section IX establishes:

Authorizes the foreigner to remain in the national territory indefinitely, with permission to work in exchange for remuneration in the country.

The following table shows foreign people documented with the Temporary Resident Card (TRT) and Permanent Resident Card (TRP) in the period 2021–2023 (January - July).

Country of origin	2023			2022			2021		
Country of origin	Temporary Resident	Permanent Resident	Total	Temporary Resident	Permanent Resident	Total	Temporary Resident	Permanent Resident	Total
North America	7,992	6,026	14,018	15,012	10,740	25,752	10,781	8,788	19,569
Canada	1,598	1,511	3,109	3,244	2,888	6,132	1,695	1,852	3,547
United States	6,394	4,515	10,909	11,768	7,852	19,620	9,086	6,936	16,022
Central America	2,047	16,023	18,070	3,891	26,448	30,339	3,243	21,989	25,232
Costa Rica	291	197	488	473	263	736	467	307	774
El Salvador	398	2,765	3,163	814	4,750	5,564	664	4,009	4,673
Guatemala	490	4,811	5,301	913	6,360	7,273	723	4,277	5,000
Honduras	460	7,773	8,233	932	14,033	14,965	804	12,368	13,172
Other Countries	408	477	885	759	1,042	1,801	585	1,028	1,613
Caribbean	3,705	3,591	7,296	6,501	8,574	15,075	2,979	7,969	10,948
Cuba	2,794	2,218	5,012	5,085	4,708	9,793	2,026	5,085	7,111
Dominican Republic	205	298	503	457	590	1,047	329	407	736
Haiti	672	1,047	1,719	897	3,229	4,126	563	2,453	3,016
Other Countries	34	28	62	62	47	109	61	24	85
South America	9,859	9,890	19,749	16,876	19,761	36,637	15,765	20,552	36,317
Argentina	1,366	932	2,298	2,598	1,576	4,174	2,661	1,472	4,133
Brazil	1,055	580	1,635	1,912	1,211	3,123	1,693	1,157	2,850
Colombia	3,910	3,210	7,120	6,188	5,261	11,449	5,867	5,225	11,092
Peru	819	406	1,225	1,318	675	1,993	995	691	1,686
Venezuela	1,149	3,962	5,111	1,955	9,693	11,648	2,378	10,635	13,013
Other Countries	1,560	800	2,360	2,905	1,345	4,250	2,171	1,372	3,543
Europe	4,428	3,067	7,495	8,733	5,278	14,011	6,662	4,641	11,303
France	565	325	890	1,391	597	1,988	1,201	569	1,770
Germany	573	307	880	1,540	609	2,149	957	422	1,379
Italy	371	299	670	775	576	1,351	738	651	1,389
Russia	814	633	1,447	851	796	1,647	298	439	737
Spain	902	667	1,569	1,844	1,294	3,138	1,653	1,345	2,998
United Kingdom	317	192	509	657	342	999	518	269	787
Other Countries	886	644	1,530	1,675	1,064	2,739	1,297	946	2,243
Asia	6,615	2,563	9,178	8,473	4,140	12,613	6,898	3,958	10,856
China	2,673	1,118	3,791	2,517	1,914	4,431	2,062	1,543	3,605
India	1,178	285	1,463	1,782	418	2,200	1,248	552	1,800
Japan	985	330	1,315	1,496	590	2,086	1,416	594	2,010
South Korea	889	342	1,231	1,365	564	1,929	1,284	724	2,008
Other Countries	890	488	1,378	1,313	654	1,967	888	545	1,433
Oceania	152	71	223	284	178	462	148	112	260
Australia	105	56	161	227	142	369	105	83	188
Other Countries	47	15	62	57	36	93	43	29	72
Africa	344	284	628	447	485	932	359	486	845
Ghana	39	39	78	40	37	77	14	35	49
Morocco	58	25	83	63	41	104	52	47	99
Nigeria	48	81	129	85	197	282	55	121	176
Other Countries	199	139	338	259	210	469	238	283	521
Total	35,142	41,515	76,657	60,217	75,604	135,821	46,835	68,495	115,330

== Immigrant groups in Mexico ==
Immigrants arrive in Mexico for many reasons, most of the documented immigrants have arrived for economic and/or work-related reasons. Many, such as executives, professionals, scientists, artists, or athletes working for either Mexican or foreign companies, arrive with secure jobs. Retirement is the main motivation for immigrants who tend to be more permanent. Aside from dual national descendants of Mexicans, naturalized Mexicans, or the undocumented, 262,672 foreign residents live on its soil. The majority of its foreign residents are from the Guatemala, followed by Africa, Spain and Haiti.

=== North American ===
==== American ====
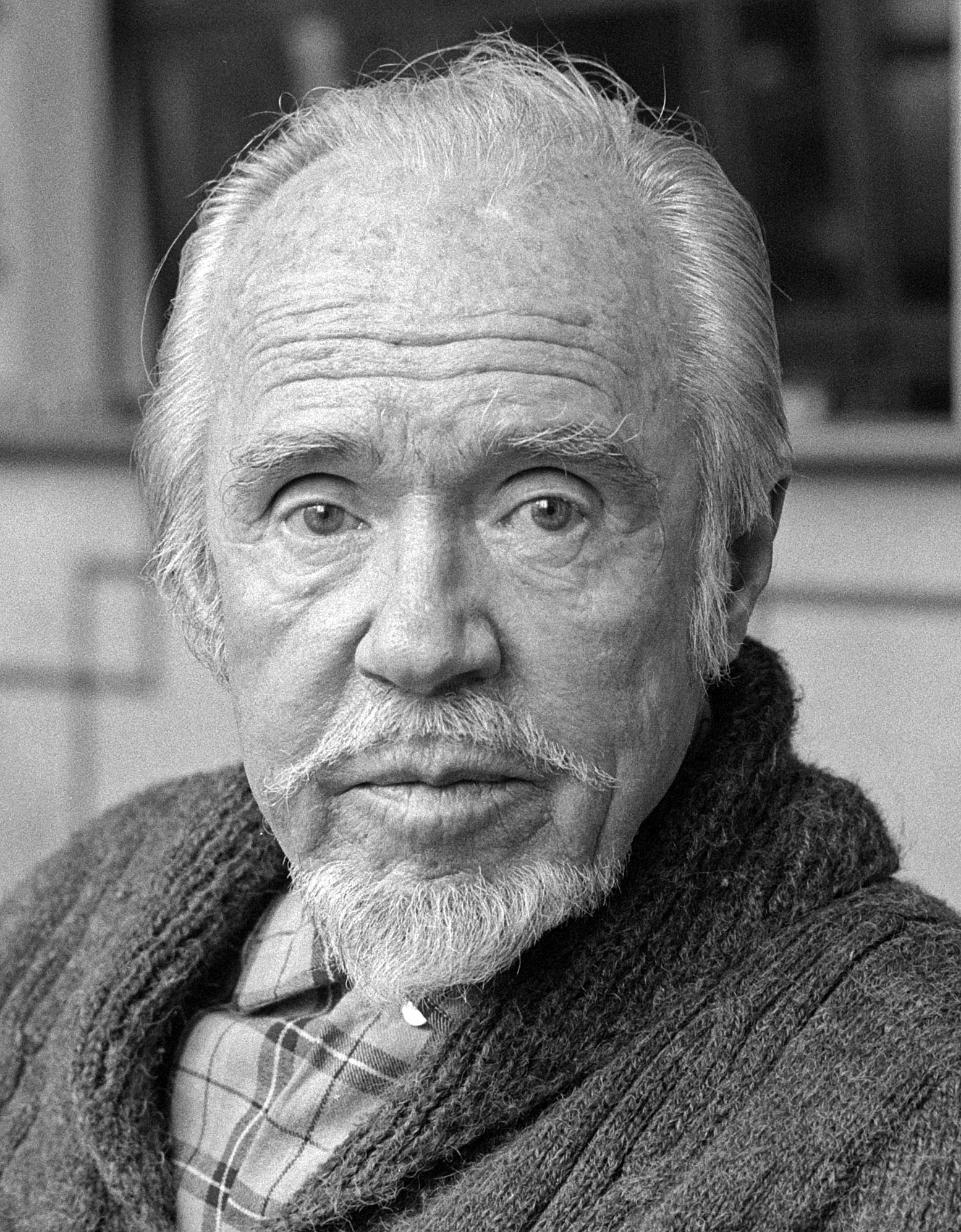
American turned-Mexican composer Conlon Nancarrow, who escaped political persecution during McCarthyism and made most of his career in Mexico City

Mexico hosts the largest community of Americans outside the United States. As of 2022, there's an estimate of 1.6 million American immigrants in Mexico. In 2020 people from the United States made the single largest immigrant group, at 65%, followed by 4% of Guatemalans and 4% of Venezuelans.

Before the COVID-19 pandemic, people from the USA were by and large retirees, students, religious workers (missionaries of the Church of Jesus Christ of Latter-day Saints, Protestant missionaries, etc.), Mexican-Americans, and spouses of Mexican citizens. A few are professors who come employed by Mexican companies to teach English, university professors and corporate employees and executives. With the advent of remote work after the COVID-19 pandemic and the soaring cost of living in the United States, many "digital nomads" have migrated to Mexico, roughly doubling the number of immigrants since 2010.

While significant numbers live in Mexico year round, some residents do not stay the whole year. Retirees may live half a year in the U.S. to keep retiree benefits. Those called "snowbirds" arrive in autumn and leave in spring. The American community in Mexico is found throughout the country, but most concentrate in the US-Mexico border cities or nearby (Tijuana, Mexicali, Matamoros, Reynosa, Nogales, Ciudad Juárez, Nuevo Laredo), the big metropolises of inland Mexico (Mexico City, Guadalajara, Monterrey, Puebla, Toluca, Morelia, Querétaro), beach resorts (Los Cabos, Rosarito, San Carlos, Puerto Peñasco, Mazatlán, Tulúm, Puerto Morelos, Mérida, Puerto Escondido, Puerto Vallarta, Ixtapan, Manzanillo), or small towns popular among retirees (Tequila, Valle de Bravo, Tepotzotlán, Malinalco, Pátzcuaro, San Miguel de Allende, Ajijic, Chapala).

Impacts on the Local Economy

For years, citizens from the United States have used Mexico as a prime location for expats. The reasons range from cheaper cost of living, acquiring seasonal housing, or a primary residence in which to work from home. For those who relocated for cheaper cost of living, it is a response to the global inflation crisis that was caused from the COVID-19 pandemic. While in the United States, the economy is slowly healing, the US Dollar can still go farther, longer. They can buy substantial homes for less than a fifth of what it would be in the United States. As a result, there has been a gradual, but significant influx of people who have permanently moved to Mexico. As of 2021, there were 1.6 million United States expats who lived across Mexico. Due to this substantial increase in foreign residents, whether part time of full time, landlords have responded by driving up the prices around 17-20% to take advantage of those who will come in and buy or rent their properties because they are still cheaper than the options within the US housing market. Semi-permanent ventures like tourism as well have generated immense revenue for the government, with US$11.5 Billion over the first five months of 2022. The local residents are on the short end of the stick however because the increase in local housing costs drives up the value of the residences as a result. For some families, who have had local businesses for over half a century, have been forcefully evicted because they cannot keep up with the increasing value of the property around them.

==== Central American ====
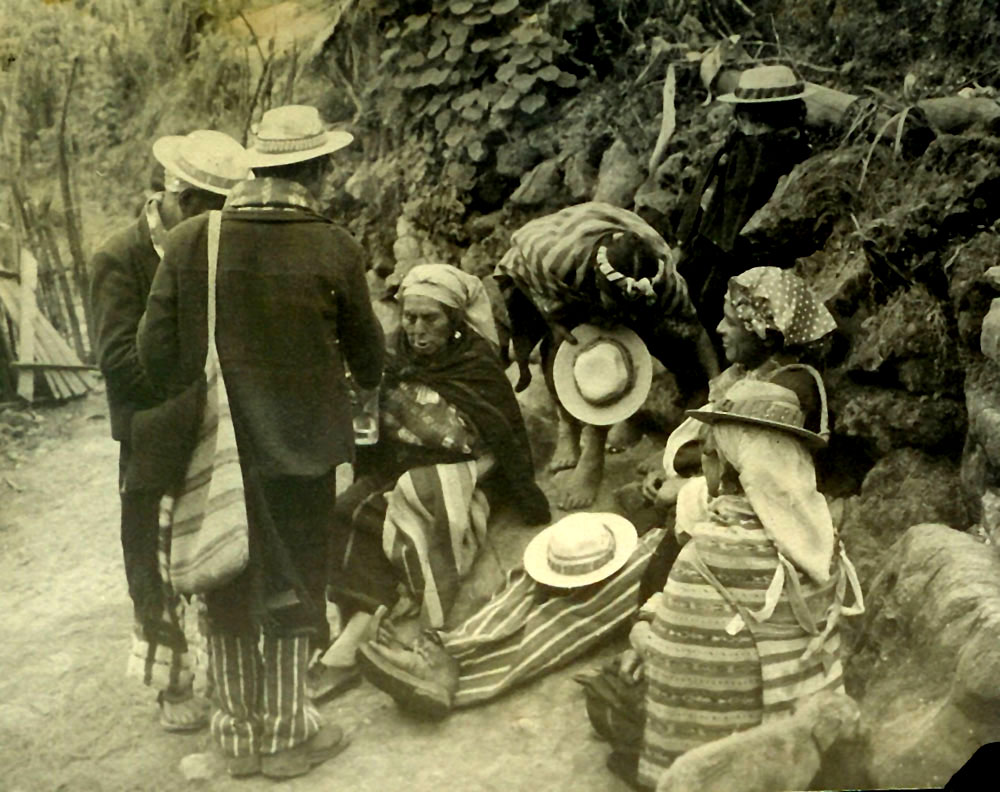
Thousands of Guatemalan indigenous people and farmers fled to the camps of Chiapas, Tabasco and Campeche during the Guatemalan Civil War.

The largest recent immigrant flows to Mexico are from Central America, with a total of 66,868 immigrants from Guatemala, Honduras, Belize, El Salvador, Costa Rica, Panama and Nicaragua living in Mexico in 2010. As a result of the Guatemalan Civil War and Salvadoran Civil War, Mexico received a significant population of refugees from those countries.

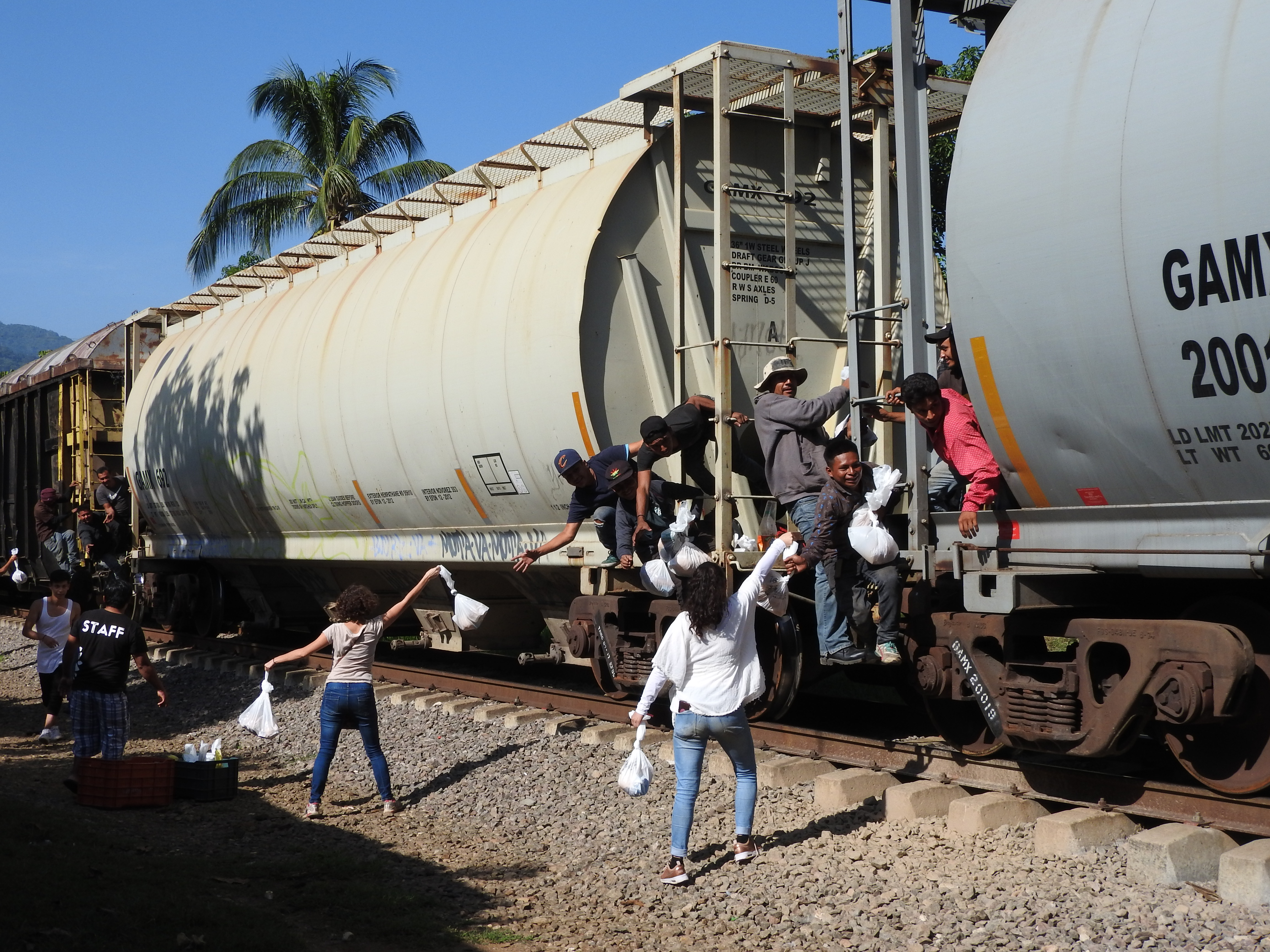
Transient migrants from Central America making their way to the U.S.-Mexico border. These migrants use a rail network known as La Bestia to traverse Mexican territory.

Recently, Mexico has also become a transit route for Central Americans and others (from the Caribbean, Africa, Asia and Eastern Europe) into the United States. 2014 was the first year since records began when more non-Mexicans than Mexicans were apprehended trying to enter the United States illegally through the U.S.-Mexico border. Non-Mexicans (vast majority of whom are Central American) were up from about 68,000 in 2007 to 257,000 in 2014; Mexicans dropped from 809,000 to 229,000 during the same period.

In 2014, Mexico began to crack down more heavily on these transient migrants. According to Mexican officials, the Plan Frontera Sur (Southern Border Plan) is designed to retake control of the historically porous southern border and protect migrants from transnational crime groups. However, the measures have been widely attributed to pressure from the United States, who does not want a repeat of 2014, when a surge of tens of thousands of women and children clogged up American immigration courts and resulted in a severe lack of space in detention centers at the US-Mexico border. More than 45,000 migrants from Central America were deported from Mexico between January and April 2019. In January 2020, Mexico detained 800 migrants who entered it illegally from Guatemala to reach the United States as part of the strict measures taken by the Mexican authorities to reduce migration to the United States through Mexico.

==== Cuban ====
Many of the popular musical genres (bolero, cha cha cha, mambo) of Mexico and the rest of Hispanic America emerged in the Caribbean.

Cuban immigration to Mexico has been on the rise in recent years. A large number of them use Mexico as a route to the U.S., and Mexico has been deporting a large number of Cubans who attempt to. About 63,000 Cubans live in Mexico The number of registered Cuban residents increased 560% between 2010 and 2016, from 4,033 to 22,604 individuals. During the same period, there was a 710% increase in the Cuban presence in Quintana Roo; a fourth of the population (5,569 individuals) live in that state.

==== Haiti ====
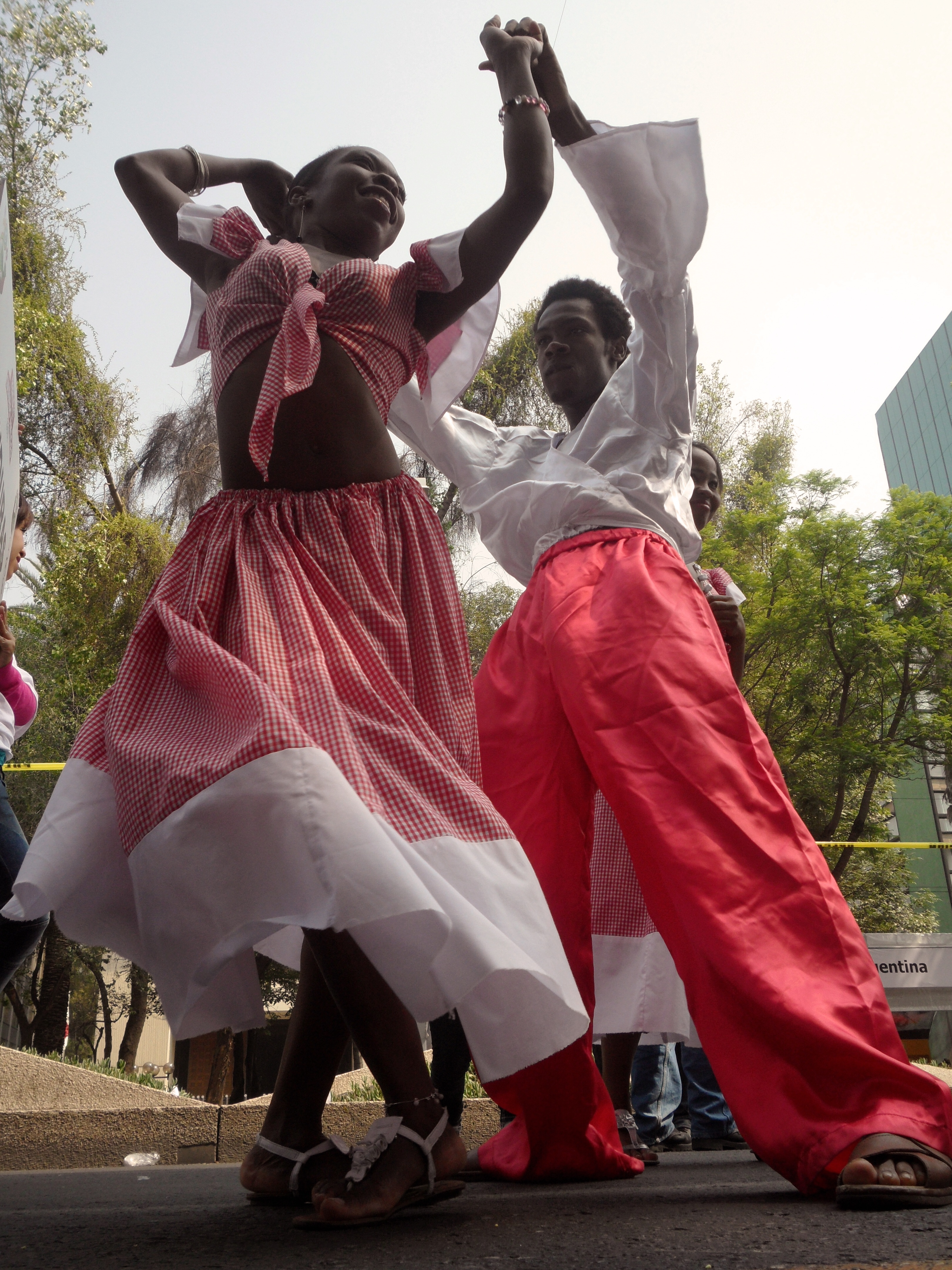
Haitian dancers at the 2011 Friend Cultures Fair in Mexico City

There is a significant Haitian diaspora in Mexico. According to a 2021 report, there are approximately 71,000 Haitian-born people living in Mexico. Haitians arrived to the country during the Duvalier regime in the 1970s, with a second wave after the 2010 earthquake. In more recent years, many have settled or stay temporarily in Mexico after being denied entrance to the United States.

=== South American ===
==== Venezuela ====
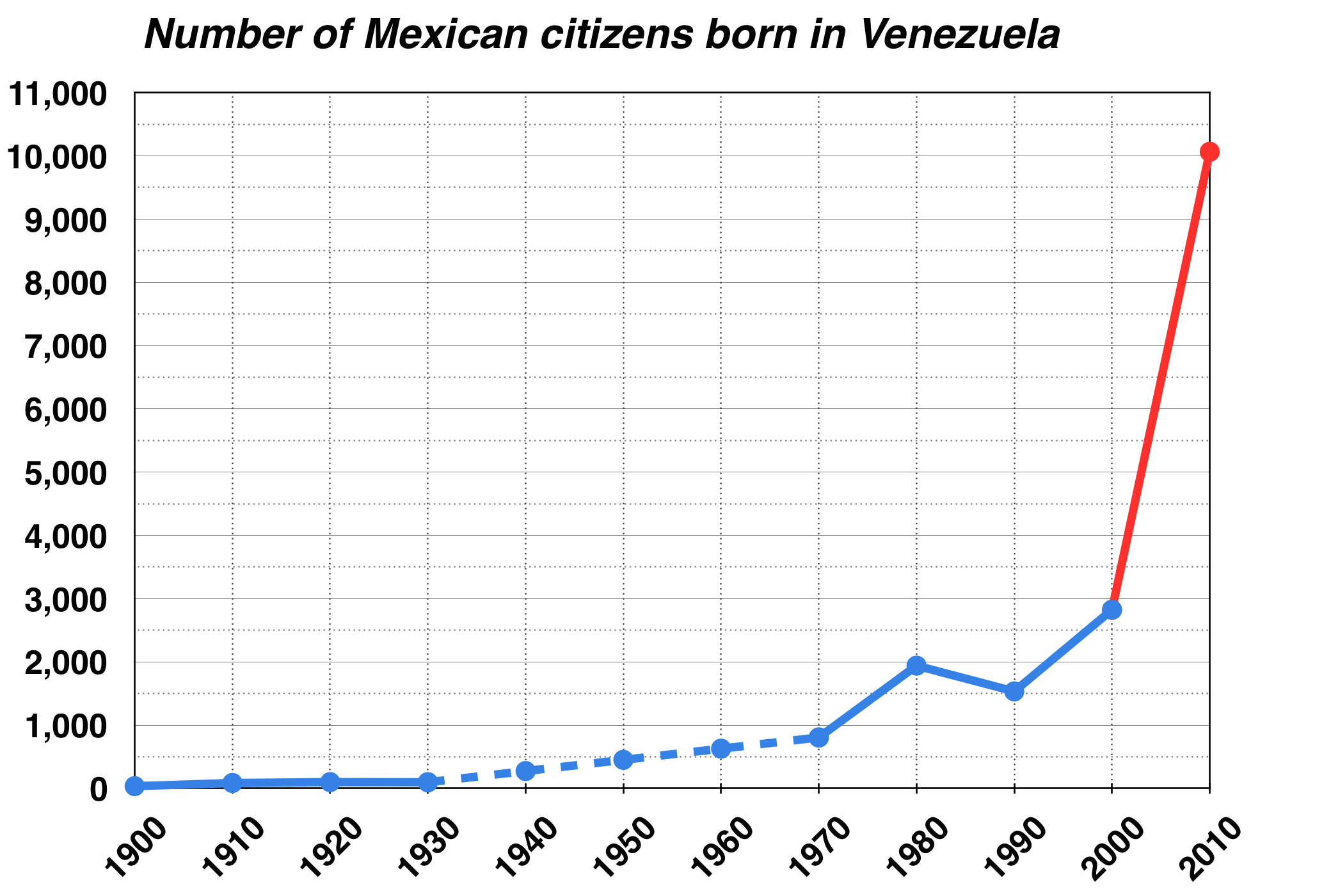
Broken line represents simulated data (Source: INEGI).

The most recent influx of immigrants has resulted from the Venezuelan diaspora, occurring due to the adverse effects of the Hugo Chávez and his Bolivarian Revolution in Venezuela. Compared to the 2000 Census, there has been an increase from the 2,823 Venezuelan Mexicans in 2000 to 10,063 in 2010, a 357% increase of Venezuelan-born individuals living in Mexico. As of 2020, there was an estimated 52,948 Venezuela-born residents in Mexico, making this the third largest immigrant community in the country and the largest immigrant community from South America in Mexico.

Mexico granted 975 Venezuelans permanent identification cards in the first 5 months of 2014 alone, a number that doubled that of Venezuelans granted ID cards altogether in 2013 and a number that would have represented 35% of all Venezuelan Mexicans in Mexico in the year 2000.

During June 2016, Venezuelans surpassed Americans (historically, first) for number of new work visas granted. The 1,183 visas granted in June were a 20% increase from the 981 granted in May. The main destinations are Mexico City, Nuevo León and Tabasco (due to the state's petroleum industry).

==== Colombian ====
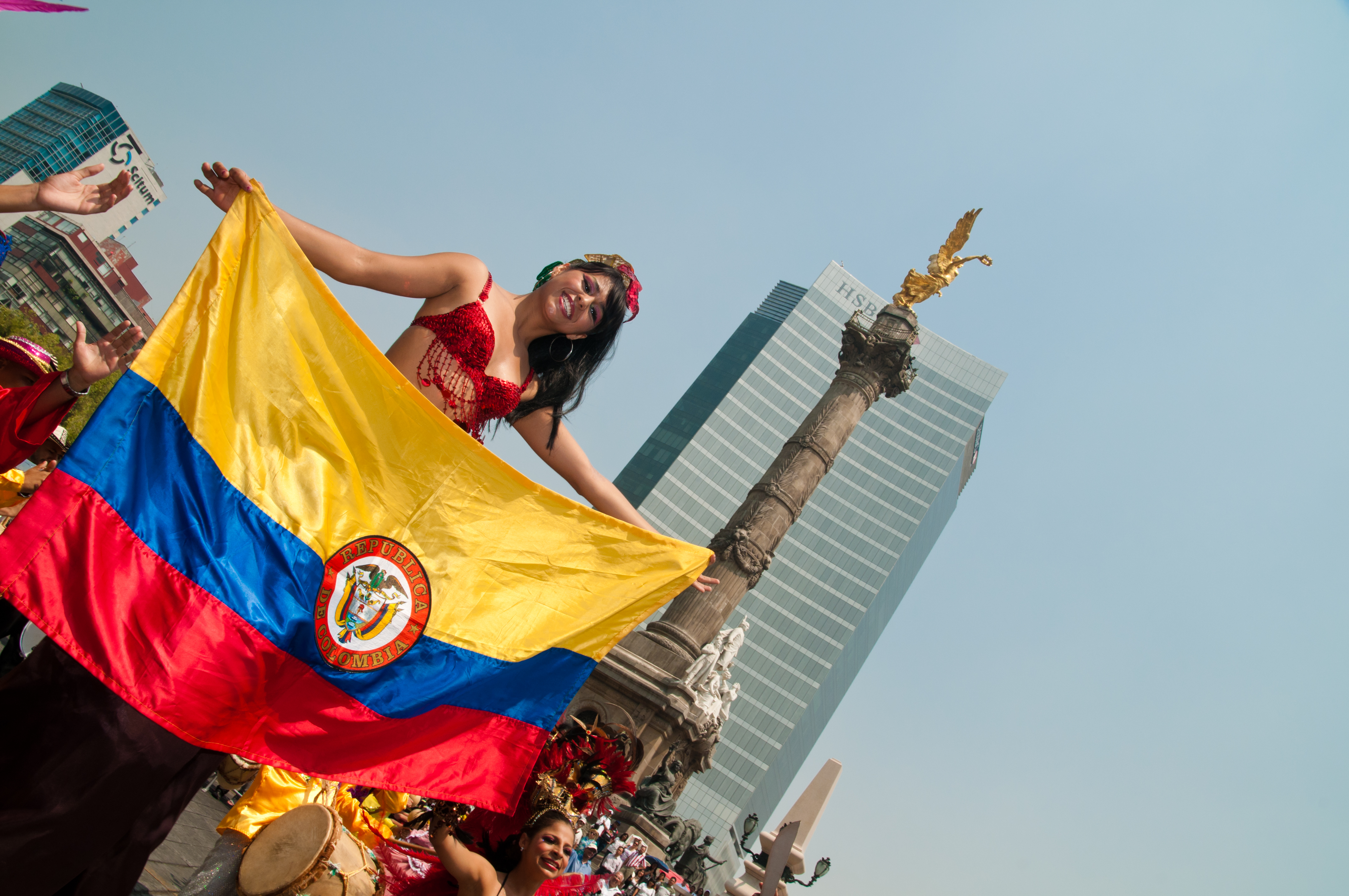
Display of the Colombian flag at the Friend Cultures Fair of Mexico City

Currently, there are 36,294 registered residents from Colombia in Mexico, making it the 4th largest immigrant community in the country and the second-largest from South America. However, it has been estimated that the total number of Colombians residing in Mexico, including unregisted migrants, could be as high as 73,000. It was not until the 1970s when the presence of Colombians increased under the protection of political asylum as refugees by the Mexican government because of the Colombian guerrilla problems fleeing from their country during the 80s and many of them were protected and kept anonymous to avoid persecution.

==== Argentines ====
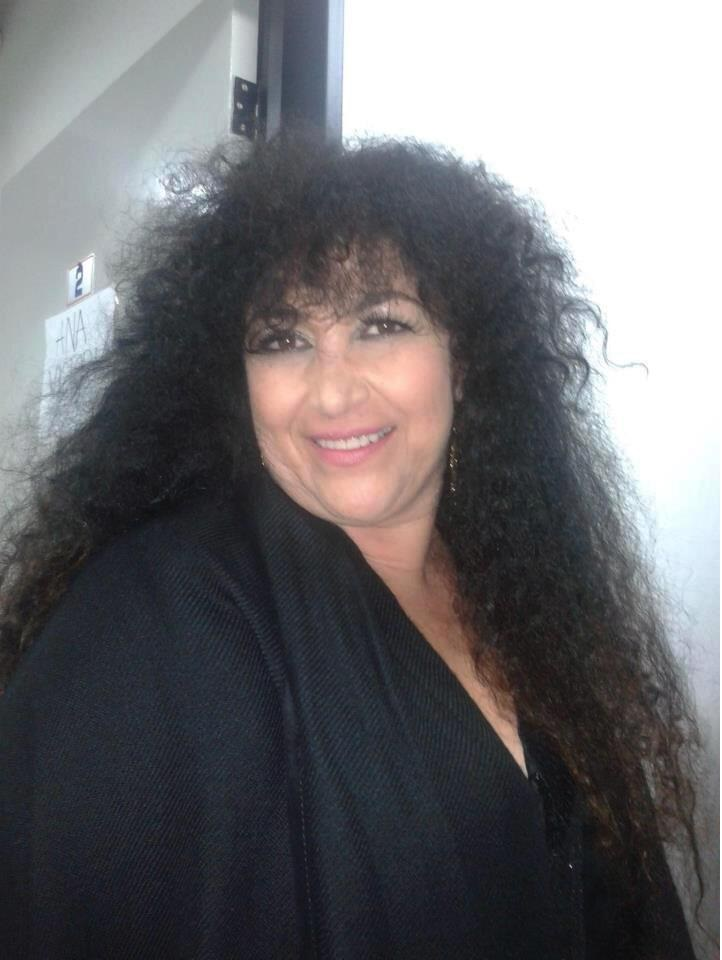
Amanda Miguel was married to Diego Verdaguer, another Argentine-Mexican singer, until his death January 28, 2022.

Argentine immigration to Mexico took place in two waves; during the 1970s Military Dictatorship in Argentina a significant number of dissidents, journalists and political exiles immigrated to Mexico, with a second wave migrating during the 2001 economic crisis. Currently, the Argentine community is the 9th largest in Mexico, with about 18,693 documented residents living in Mexico as of 2020.

The largest Argentine communities are in Mexico City (with a sizeable congregation in the Condesa neighborhood) and in Quintana Roo, where the number of Argentines doubled between 2011 and 2015, and now make a total of 10,000, making up the largest number of foreigners in the state. There are smaller communities in Leon, Guadalajara, Puebla, Cancun, Playa del Carmen, Tulum, Mérida, Monterrey, and Tampico. Most Argentines established in Mexico come from the city of Buenos Aires and the provinces of Buenos Aires, Santa Fe, Cordoba, Mendoza and Tucuman. The Argentine community has participated in the opening of establishments such as restaurants, bars, boutiques, modeling consultants, foreign exchange interbank markets, among other lines of business.

=== Asian ===
Mexico has seen immigration from different parts of Asia throughout its history. The first known Asians arrived during the Colonial era as slaves, labourers and adventurers from the Philippines, southern China and India. Smaller numbers of immigrants came from Korea, Ceylon (now Sri Lanka), Indonesia, Cambodia, Japan and the Malay peninsula. This group of immigrants were collectively described as "Chino" meaning Chinese despite coming from many diverse origins. During the early 20th century, a significant number of Asians, primarily Chinese and Korean, were imported as labourers. These immigrants were known as Henequen and Chinetescos and were heavily concentrated in agricultural plantations in the Pacific states (e.g. Sinaloa) and the Yucatán Peninsula.

Overall, Asian immigration to Mexico, as with many other Latin American countries, has mainly come from countries in East Asia (such as China and Japan) and Western Asia (namely Lebanon and Syria).

==== Korean ====
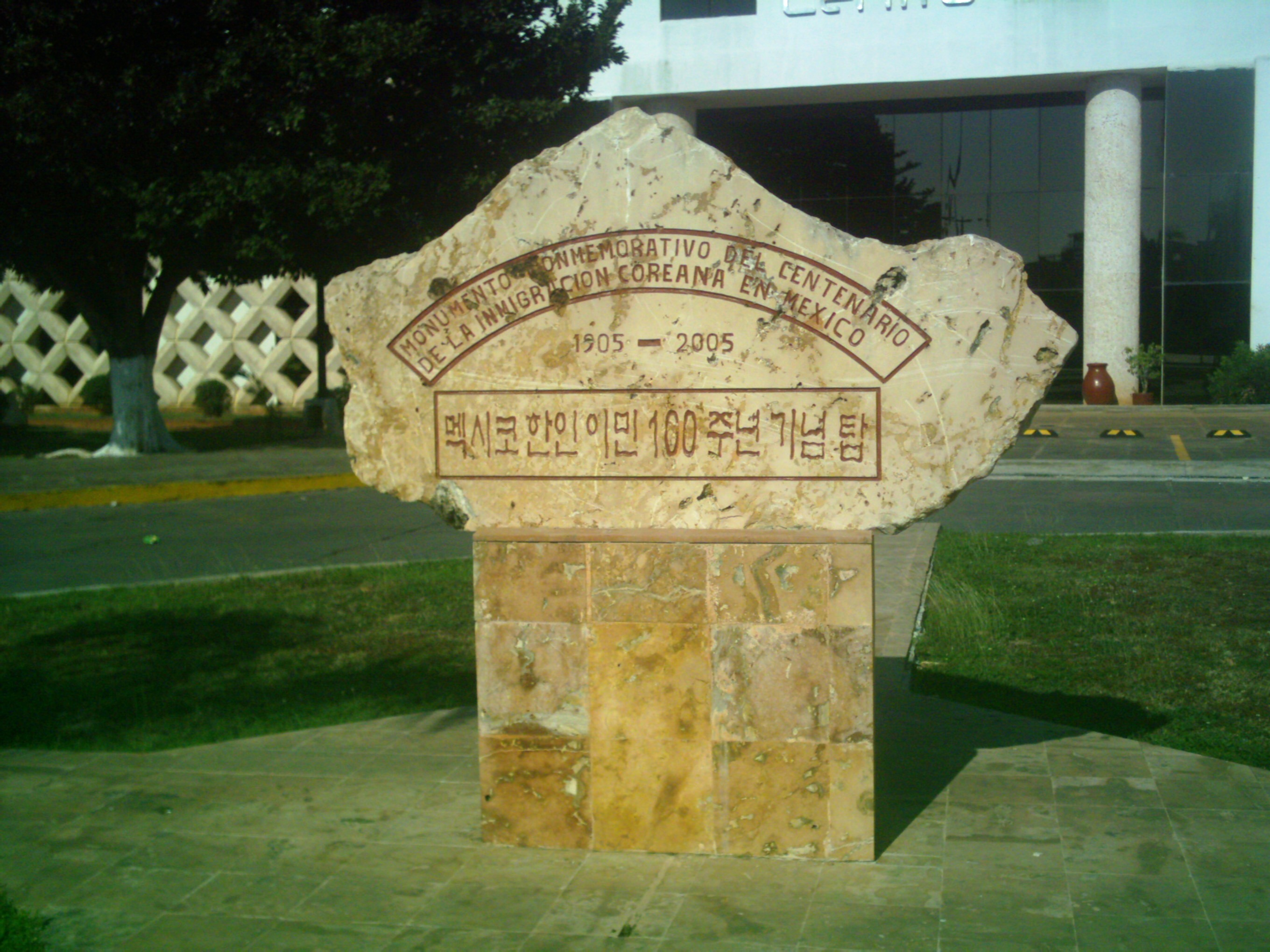
Monument in Merida, Yucatan commemorating 100 years of Korean immigration

A more recent wave (late 20th and early 21st century) of Korean immigrants have arrived as merchants and skilled labourers. Modern immigrants can be found in large cities (Mexico City, Monterrey, Querétaro), while Korean descendants are most numerous in the coastal regions like Baja California, Sonora, Guerrero, Veracruz, Campeche, Yucatán and Quintana Roo. According to INM, in 2009 there were 5,518 South Koreans and 481 North Koreans living in Mexico. There are an estimated 40,000 descendants of Korean henequen workers.

==== Chinese ====
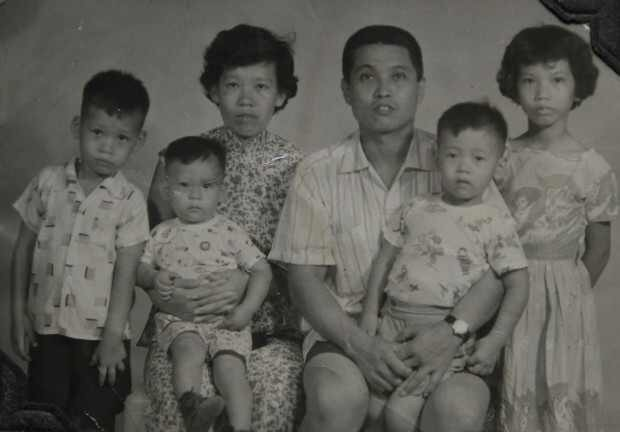
Chinese-Mexican family expelled from Mexico to Macau during WWII. Anti-Chinese sentiment in Mexico started in the 1920s and lasted until the 1960s.

The story of Chinese immigration to Mexico extends from the late 19th century to the 1930s. By the 1920s, there was a significant population of Chinese nationals, with Mexican wives and Chinese-Mexican children. Most of these were deported in the 1930s to the United States and China with a number being repatriated in the late 1930s and in 1960. Smaller groups returned from the 1930s to the 1980s. The two main Chinese-Mexican communities are in Mexicali and Mexico City but few are of pure Chinese blood.

The city of Mexicali in Baja California has the largest Chinese population in Mexico and the largest Chinatown called La Chinesca. The culture and language from the mainly Cantonese and Mandarin-speaking peoples are evident in the food, architecture, and everyday life in Mexico City. The Chinese entered the nation in the 19th century to build railroads, and many xenophobic acts were taken against them because Mexico preferred European immigrants. According to the 2010 Census there are 6,655 Chinese immigrants living in Mexico.

==== Filipino ====
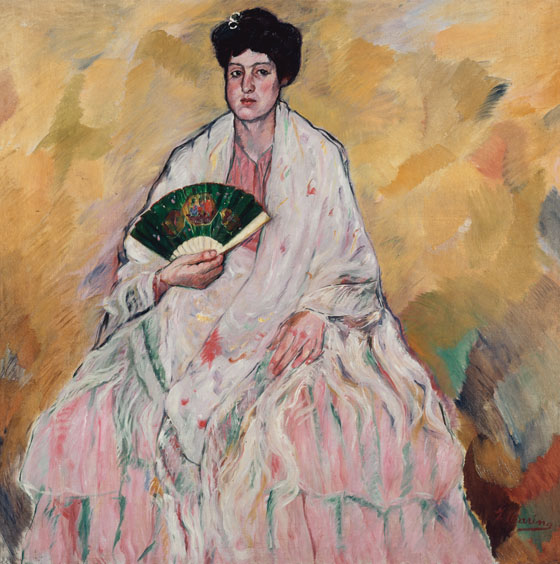
The mantón de Manila were originally inspired by the Filipino pañuelo, both also influenced the later designs of the rebozo

Filipinos arrived from the Philippines via the Manila galleons when the country was under Spanish colonial rule (1540s-1898) and was directly administrated from New Spain until around 1815. They also arrived during the U.S. American territorial rule (1899–1946). Christianized Filipinos comprised the majority of free Asian immigrants (chino libre) during the Spanish colonial era and could own property and have rights that even Native Americans did not have, including the right to carry a sword and dagger for personal protection. Filipinos introduced many cultural practices to Mexico; such as the method of making coconut palm wine called "tubâ", and possibly the guayabera (which is still called "filipina" in Yucatán) from the barong tagalog. Filipino words also entered Mexican vernacular, such as the word for palapa (originally meaning "coconut palm leaf petiole" in Tagalog), which became applied to a type of thatching using coconut leaves that resembles the Filipino nipa hut in Mexican Spanish.

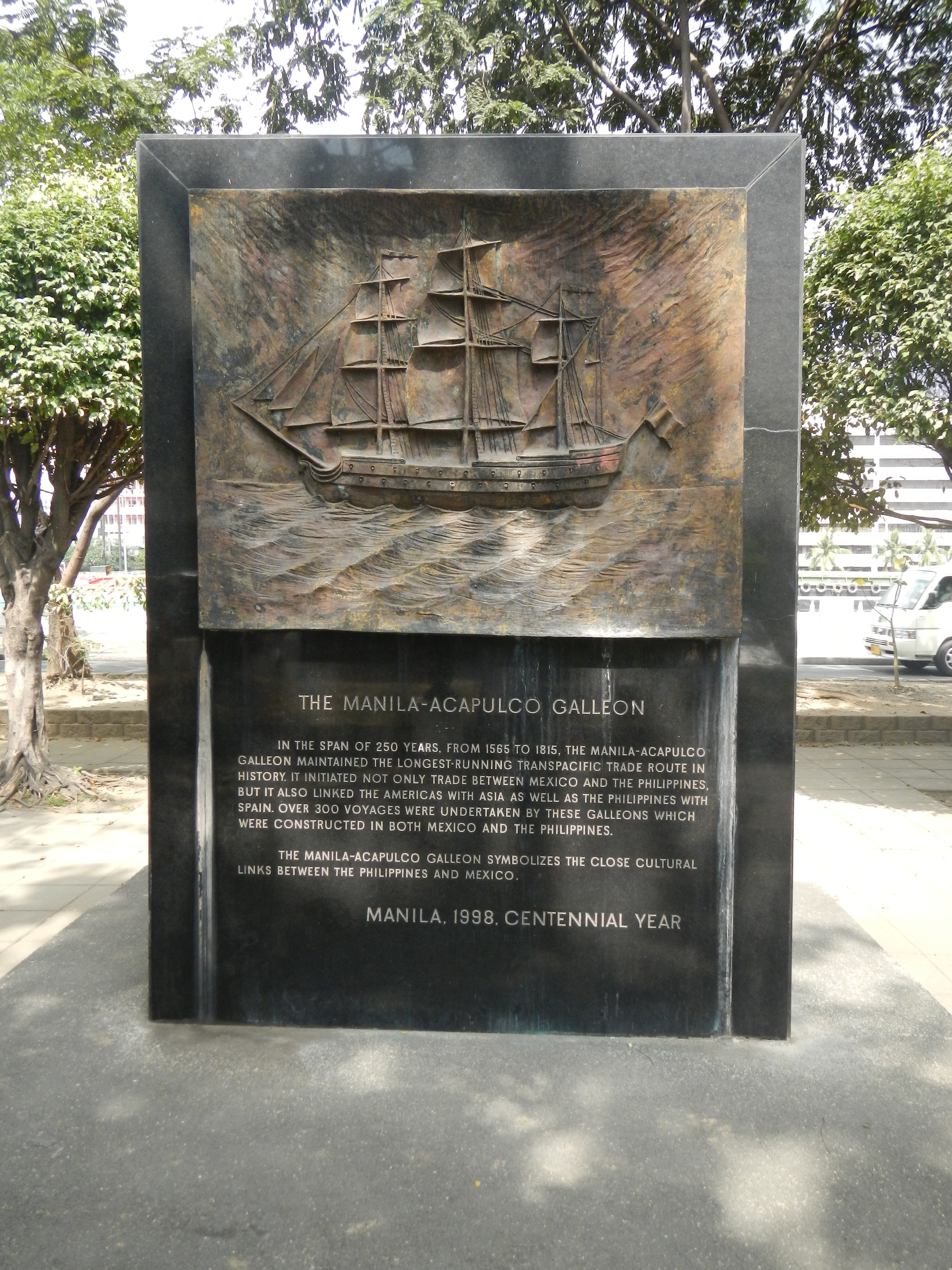
The Manila-Acapulco Galleon Memorial at Plaza Mexico in Intramuros, Manila

During the early period of the Spanish colonization of the Philippines, Spaniards took advantage of the indigenous alipin (bonded serf) system in the Philippines to circumvent the Leyes de las Indias and acquire Filipino slaves for the voyage back to New Spain. Though the numbers are unknown, it was so prevalent that slaves brought on ships were restricted to one per person (except persons of rank) in the "Laws Regarding Navigation and Commerce" (1611–1635) to avoid exhausting ship provisions. They were also taxed heavily upon arrival in Acapulco in an effort to reduce slave traffic. Traffic in Filipina women as slaves, servants, and mistresses of government officials, crew, and passengers, also caused scandals in the 17th century. Women comprised around 20% of the migrants from the Philippines.

Filipinos were also pressed into service as sailors, due to the native maritime culture of the Philippine Islands. By 1619, the crew of the Manila galleons were composed almost entirely of native Filipino sailors. Many of whom died during the voyages due to harsh treatment and dangerous conditions. Many of the galleons were also old, overloaded, and poorly repaired. A law passed in 1608 restricted the gear of Filipino sailors to "ropa necesaria" which consisted of a single pair of breeches, further causing a great number of deaths of Filipino sailors through exposure. These conditions prompted King Philip III to sign a law in 1620 forcing merchants to issue proper clothing to native crews. During this period, many Filipino sailors deserted as soon as they reached Acapulco. Sebastian de Piñeda, the captain of the galleon Espiritu Santo complained to the king in 1619 that of the 75 Filipino crewmen aboard the ship, only 5 remained for the return voyage. The rest had deserted. These sailors settled in Mexico and married locals (even though some may have been previously married in the Philippines), particularly since they were also in high demand by wine-merchants in Colima for their skills in the production of tubâ (palm wine).

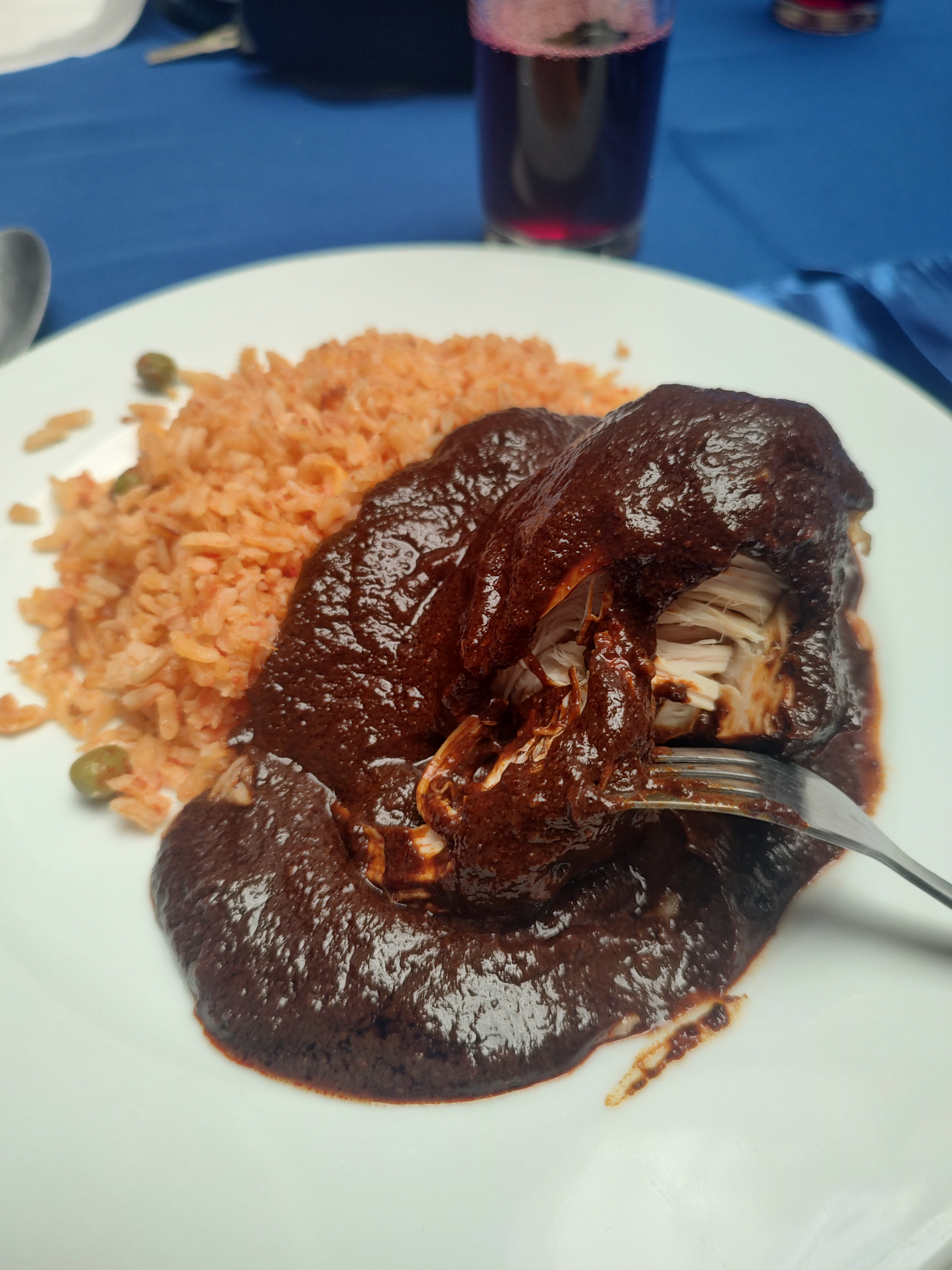
Rice was introduced very early into Mexican cuisine due to contact with East Asia from the Manilla Galleon.

Filipinos mostly settled in the regions near the terminal ports of the Manila galleons. These include Acapulco, Barra de Navidad, and San Blas, Nayarit, as well as numerous smaller intermediate settlements along the way. They also settled the regions of Colima and Jalisco before the 17th century, which were seriously depopulated of Native American settlements during that period due to the Cocoliztli epidemics and Spanish forced labor. They also settled in signiciant numbers in the barrio San Juan of Mexico City, although in modern times, the area has become more associated with later Chinese migrants.

In modern times, historical Filipino migrants to Mexico have lost their cultural identity and are often confused with the more recent Chinese immigrants due to the fact that Filipinos and other Asian migrants (mostly from Spanish and Portuguese territories in Southeast Asia and South Asia) were all known as chinos or indios chinos during the colonial era, despite only a very small minority of them being actually from China. Filipinos also adopted Spanish names and surnames with the implementation of the Catálogo alfabético de apellidos during the mid-19th century. This makes it very difficult to trace and recognize Filipino immigrants in colonial records.

There are approximately 200,000 (0.2%) Mexican people who can partly claim Filipino ancestry stemming from colonial times. According to INM, in 2009 there were 823 immigrants from the Philippines residing in Mexico. A genetic study in 2018 found that around a third of the population of Guerrero have 10% Filipino ancestry.

==== Japanese ====
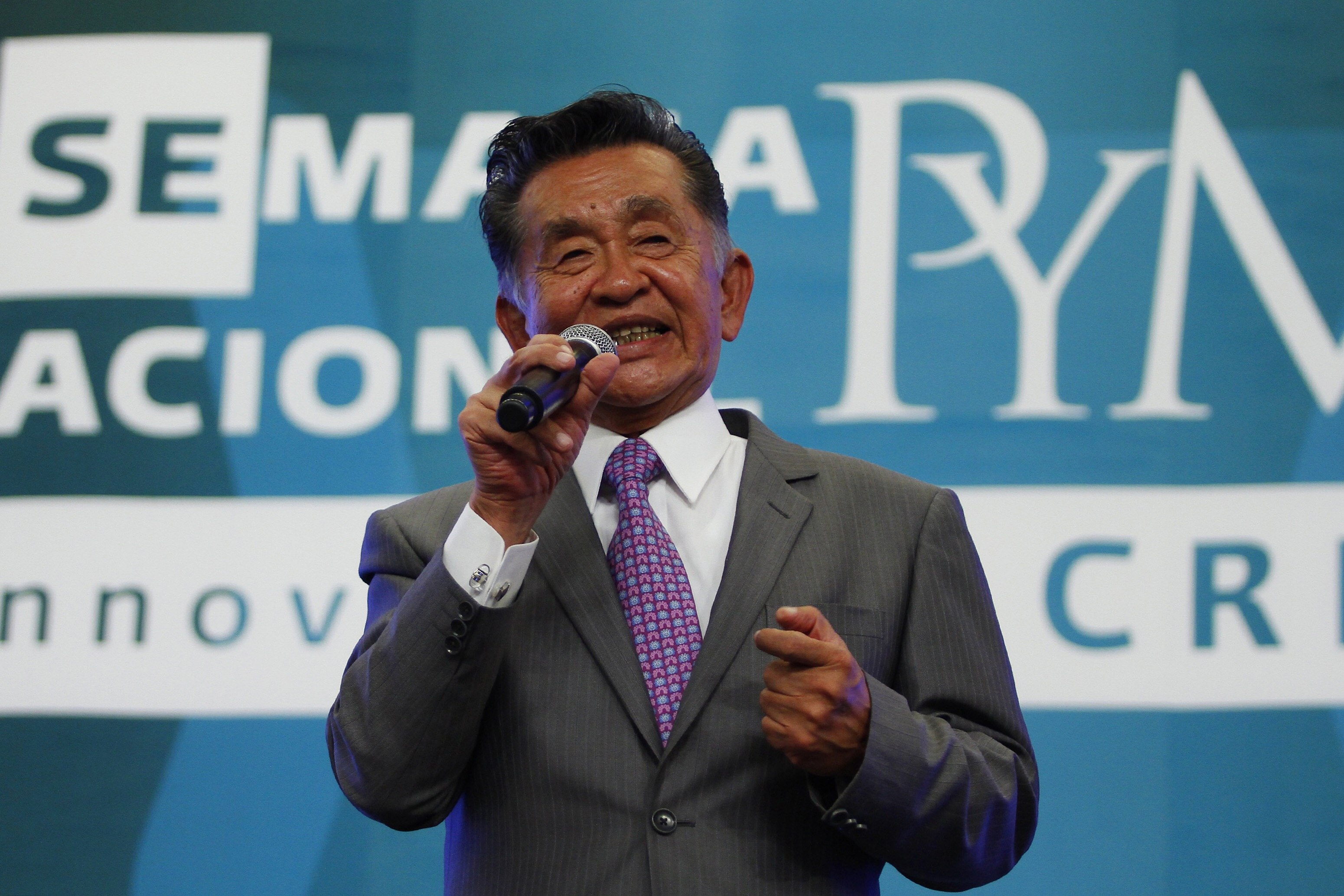
Carlos Kasuga prominent businessman and president of Yakult Mexico.

The Japanese community is also important in Mexico, and they reside mainly in Mexico City, Morelia, San Luis Potosí, Puebla, Monterrey, Querétaro, León, Toluca, Tijuana, Guadalajara, and Aguascalientes, and the immigrant colony in the state of Chiapas known as Colonia Enomoto. The Japanese language is important in their cultural life in Mexico and many institutions for nikkei exist and those wishing to learn the language and their ways of life can attend these lyceums. According to INM, in 2009 there were 4,485 Japanese immigrants residing in Mexico.

==== Arab world ====
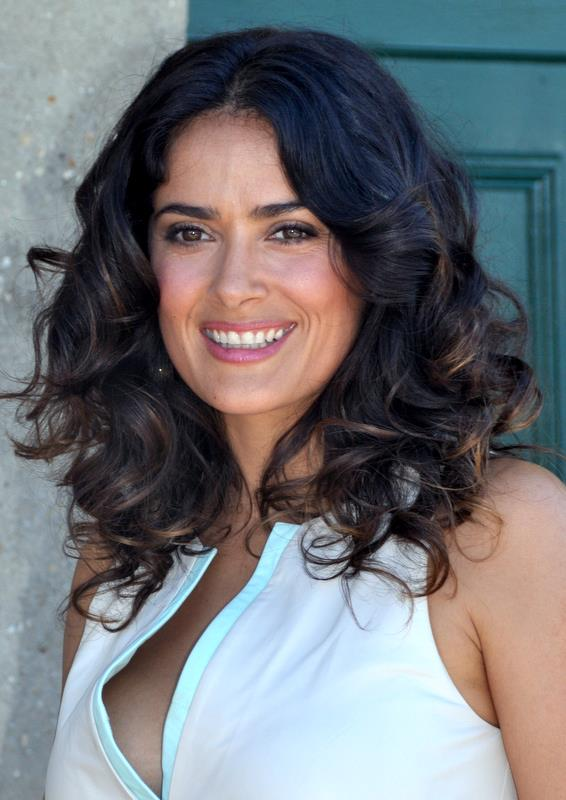
Salma Hayek, Mexican actress of Lebanese descent

Ethnologue reports that 400,000 Mexicans speak Arabic.

The Arab Mexican population consists of Lebanese, Syrians and Palestinians, whose families arrived in Mexico after the fall of the Ottoman Empire in World War I. The majority of them are Christian but some are Muslims.

Carlos Slim is a Mexican business magnate, investor, and philanthropist of Lebanese descent. He was ranked as the richest person in the world by Forbes business magazine, from 2010 to 2013.

==== Jewish ====
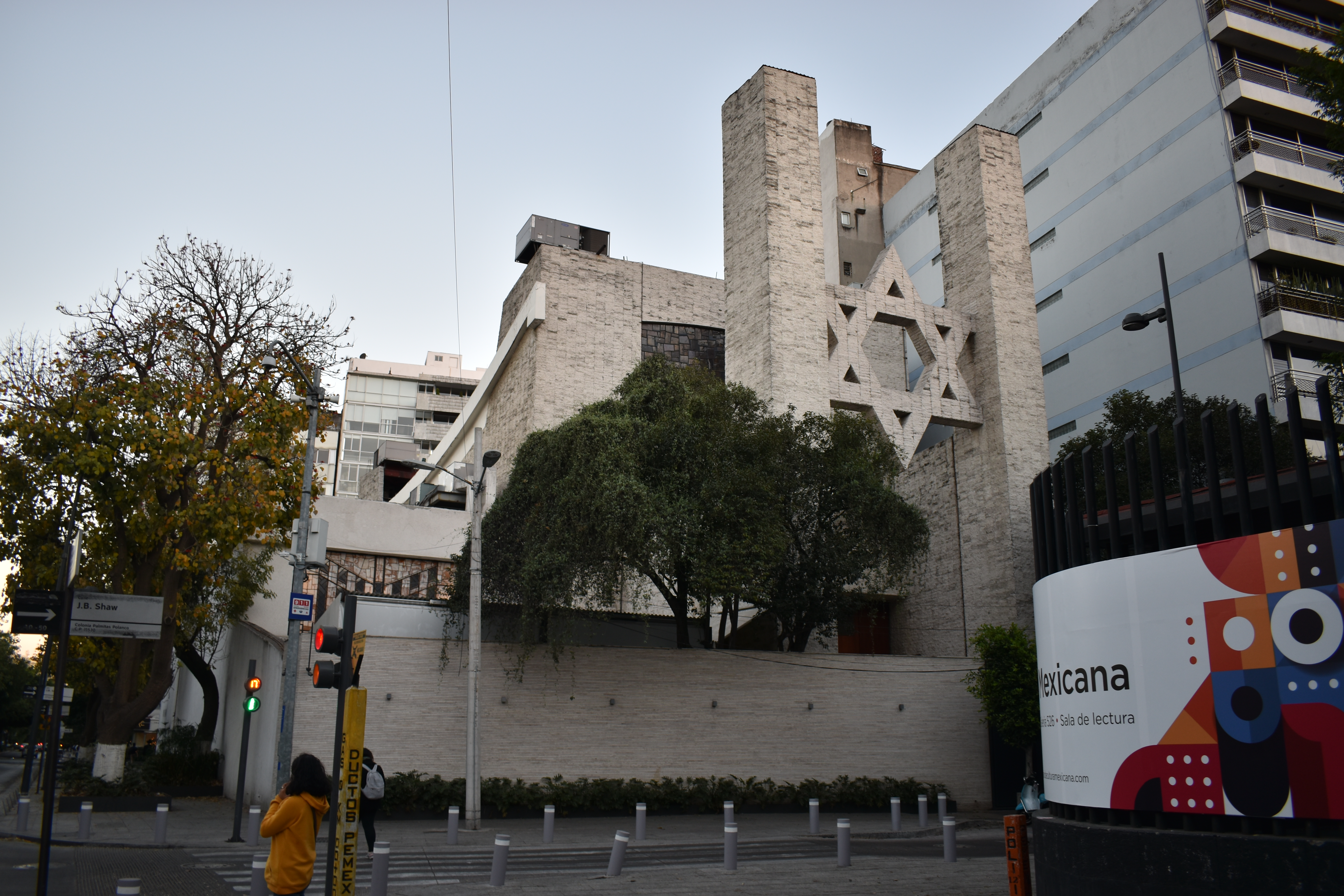
Synagogue of Mexico City

The history of the Jews in Mexico began in 1519 with the arrival of Conversos, often called Marranos or "Crypto-Jews", referring to those Jews forcibly converted to Catholicism and that then became subject to the Spanish Inquisition.

When the monopoly of the Roman Catholic Church in Mexico was replaced with religious toleration during the nineteenth-century Liberal reform, Jews could openly immigrate to Mexico. They came from Europe and later from the crumbling Ottoman Empire, including Syria, until the first half of the 20th century. Others arrived as refugees during World War II, escaping from the Jewish Holocaust. Today, most Jews in Mexico are descendants of this immigration and still divided by diasporic origin, principally Yiddish-speaking Ashkenazi and Judaeo-Spanish-speaking Sephardim. They are concentrated in big cities: Mexico City, Guadalajara, Monterrey.

==== Armenians ====
The Armenian diaspora population in Mexico is small in comparison with other immigrant groups. The majority of the population arrived in Mexico between 1910 and 1928, most of them because of the Armenian genocide.

=== European ===
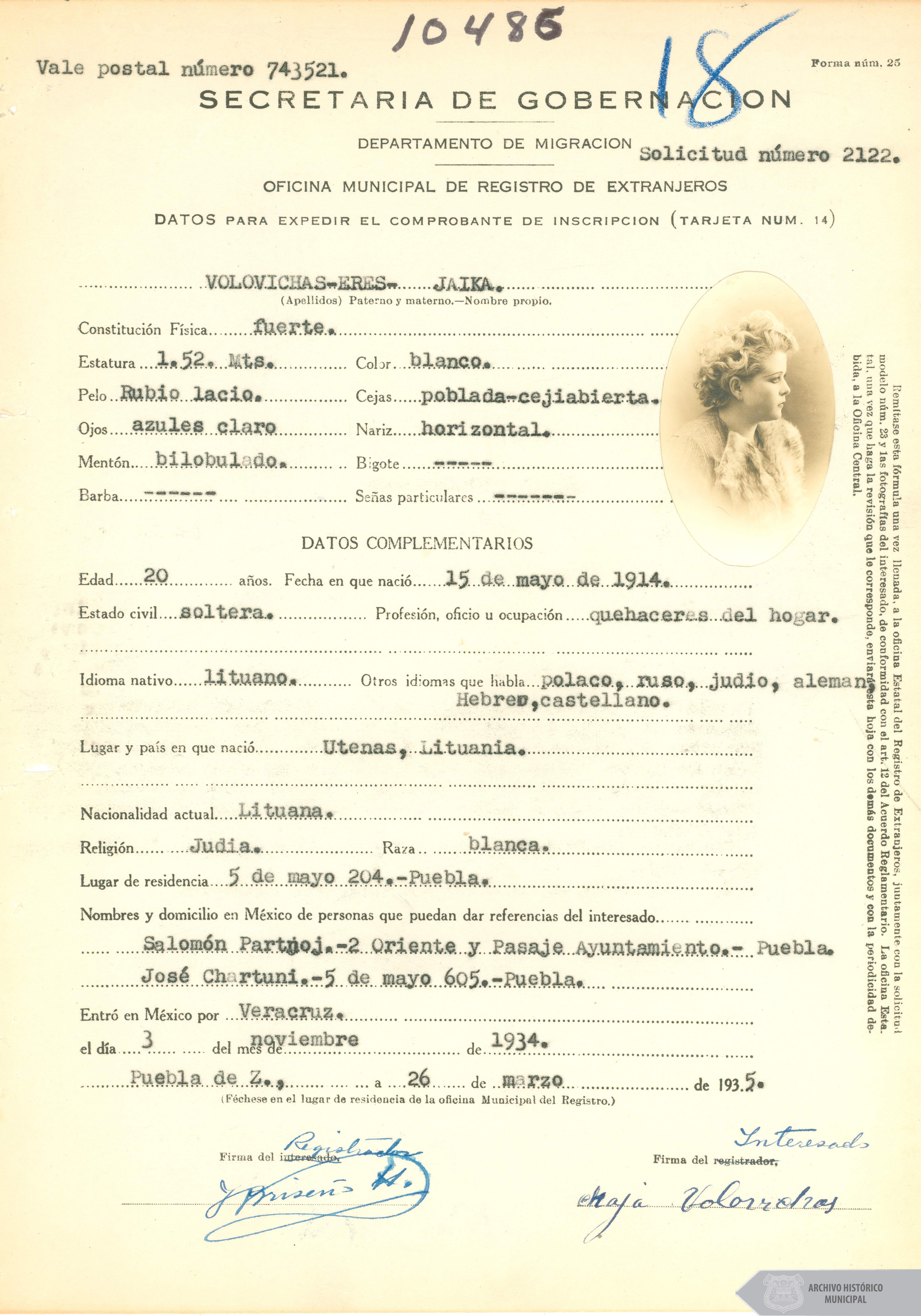
Immigrant registration form of a Jewish Lithuanian woman that emigrated to Mexico in 1934. The restrictions applied to Eastern Europeans did not eliminate migration of affected groups.

Although Mexico never received massive European immigration after its independence, about one million Europeans immigrated to Spanish America during the colonial period. They were in their majority from Spain.

Towards the end of the Porfiriato, there were an estimated 100,000 to 200,000 foreigners in the country. The three largest groups were the Spanish, the American and the Chinese.

From 1911 to 1931, 226,000 immigrants arrived in Mexico, the majority of which were from Europe.

==== British ====
There are Mexicans of English, Welsh and Scottish descent. According to Mexico's Migration Institute, in 2009 there were 3,761 British expatriates living in Mexico.

Cornish culture still survives in local architecture and food in the state of Hidalgo. The Scottish and Welsh have also made their mark in Mexico, especially in the states of Hidalgo, Jalisco, Aguascalientes, and Veracruz. British immigrants formed the first football teams in Mexico in the late 19th century. Northern Spaniards of Celtic ancestry like the Asturians, Galicians, and Cantabrians, have also left an imprint in Mexican culture and their languages formed many distinct accents in various regions in Mexico, especially in the central and northern states.

==== French ====
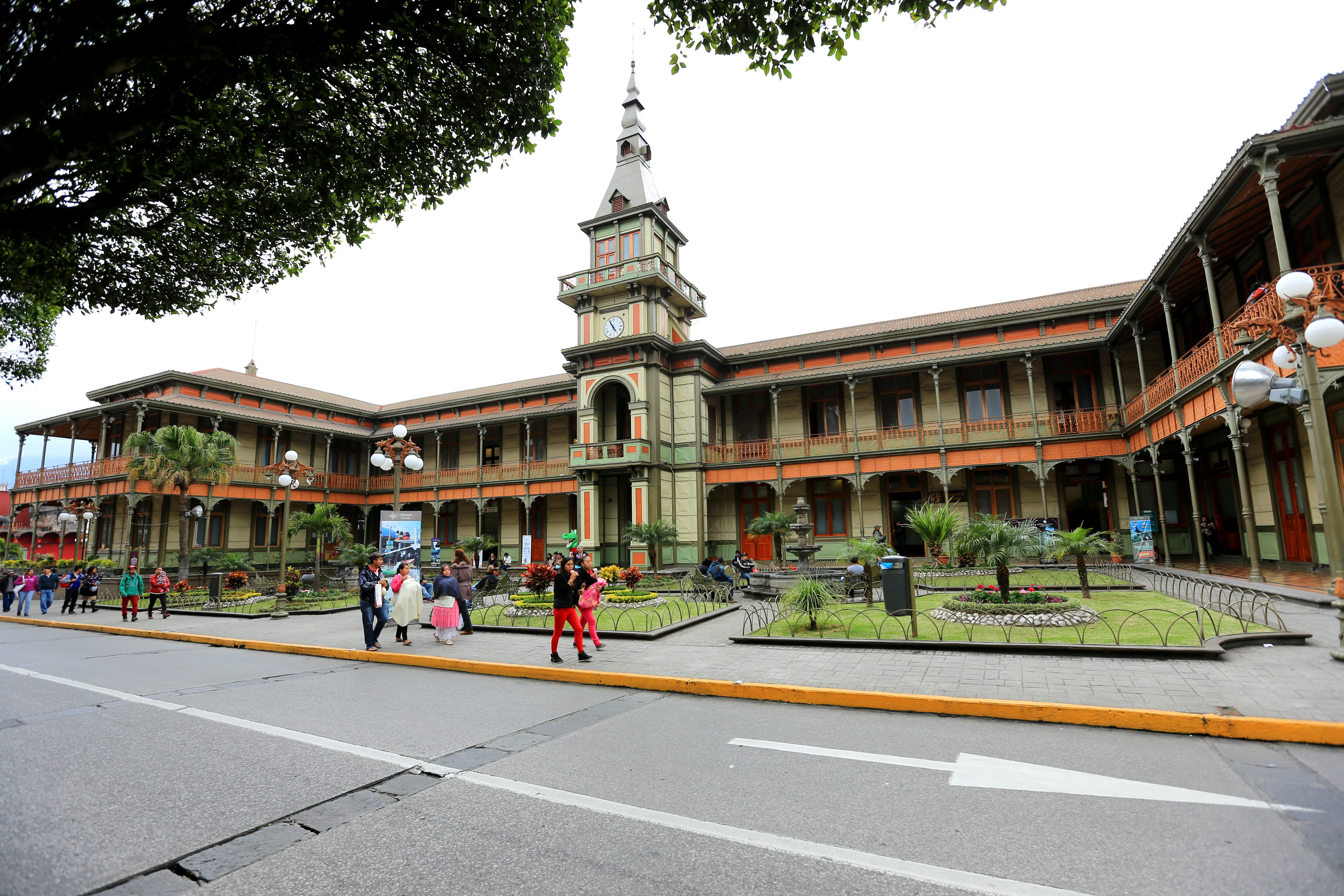
Palacio de Hierro at Orizaba, Veracruz. Designed by Gustave Eiffel.

Mexico received immigration from France in waves in the 19th and 20th centuries. According to the 2010 census, there were 7,163 French nationals living in Mexico. According to the French consulate general, there are 30,000 French citizens in Mexico as of 2015.

The French language is often taught and studied in secondary public education and in universities throughout the country. French may also be heard occasionally in the state of Veracruz in the cities of Jicaltepec, San Rafael, Mentideros, and Los Altos, where the architecture and food is also very French. These immigrants came from Haute-Saône département in France, especially from Champlitte and Bourgogne.

Another French group were the "Barcelonettes" from the Alpes-de-Haute-Provence département, who migrated specifically to Mexico to find jobs and work in merchandising and are well known in Mexico City, Puebla, Veracruz and Yucatán.

An important French village in Mexico is Santa Rosalía, Baja California Sur, where the French culture/architecture are still found. Other French cultural traits are in a number of regional cultures such as the states of Jalisco and Sinaloa.

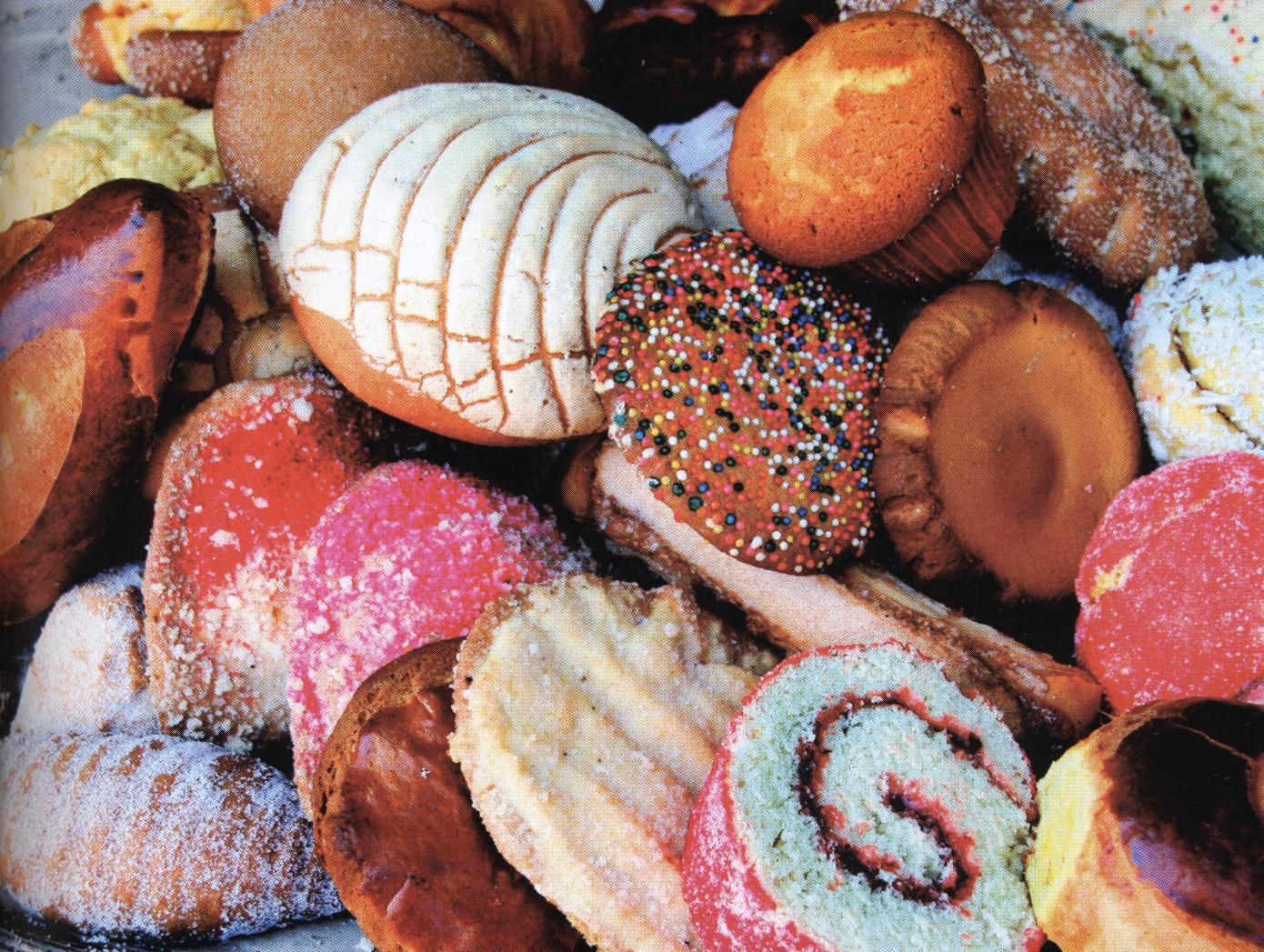
French influence is notable in Mexican pastries and cheese production.

During the second French intervention (1860s) many parts of the country, including Mexico City, effectively fell under the control of France under the administration of the Austrian puppet-Emperor Maximilian of Habsburg. The military campaign imported thousands of soldiers from France (some of them black) and its European allies at the time. It's said that at the end of the war some soldiers remained in rural areas in El Bajío. The descendants of these soldiers are allegedly found in the state of Jalisco in the region called Los Altos de Jalisco and in many towns around this region, for instance in the state of Michoacán in cities like Coalcomán, Aguililla, Zamora, and Cotija. One vernacular hypothesis for the origin of the word "mariachi" (the folk music of Central-Western Mexico) is that it comes from the French "marriage", because it was the music played at weddings of French landowning families of Jalisco and Michoacán. It should also be noted that the region already was a hub of Spanish-descended Mexicans since colonial times.

Other Francophone peoples include those from Belgium such as the Walloons and Franco-Swiss from Switzerland. The Belgians, started by the veteran Ch. Loomans, tried to establish a Belgian colony in the state of Chihuahua called Nueva Bélgica, and hundreds of Belgian settlers established it, but many moved to the capital of the state and other towns around the area, where the Walloon and French could be heard.

The Occitan language can be heard in the state of Guanajuato, it is also known as Langue d'oc is a language originally spoken in Southern France.

==== German ====
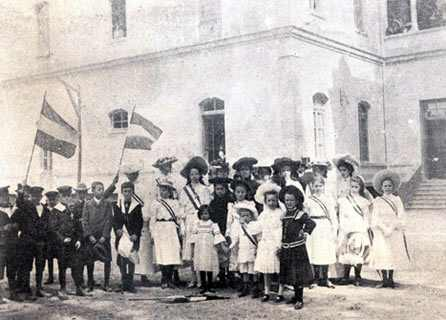
Students of the Colegio Alemán Alexander von Humboldt, which was founded by German immigrants in 1894

The Plautdietsch language, is spoken by descendants of German and Dutch Mennonite immigrants in the states of Chihuahua and Durango. Other German communities are in Nuevo León, Puebla, Mexico City, Sinaloa and Chiapas, and the Yucatán Peninsula. The largest German school outside of Germany is in Mexico City (Alexander von Humboldt school). These represent the large German populations where they still try to preserve the German culture (evident in its popular regional polka-like music types, conjunto and norteño) and language. Other strong German communities lie in Coahuila and Zacatecas (notably the Mennonites), Chiapas (Tapachula) and other parts of Nuevo León (esp. the Monterrey area has a large German minority), Tamaulipas (the Rio Grande Valley in connections to German American culture and Mexican American or Tejano influences), Puebla (Nuevo Necaxa) where the German culture and language have been preserved to different extents. According to the 2010 census, there were 6,214 Germans living in Mexico. As of 2012, about 20,000 Germans reside in Mexico.

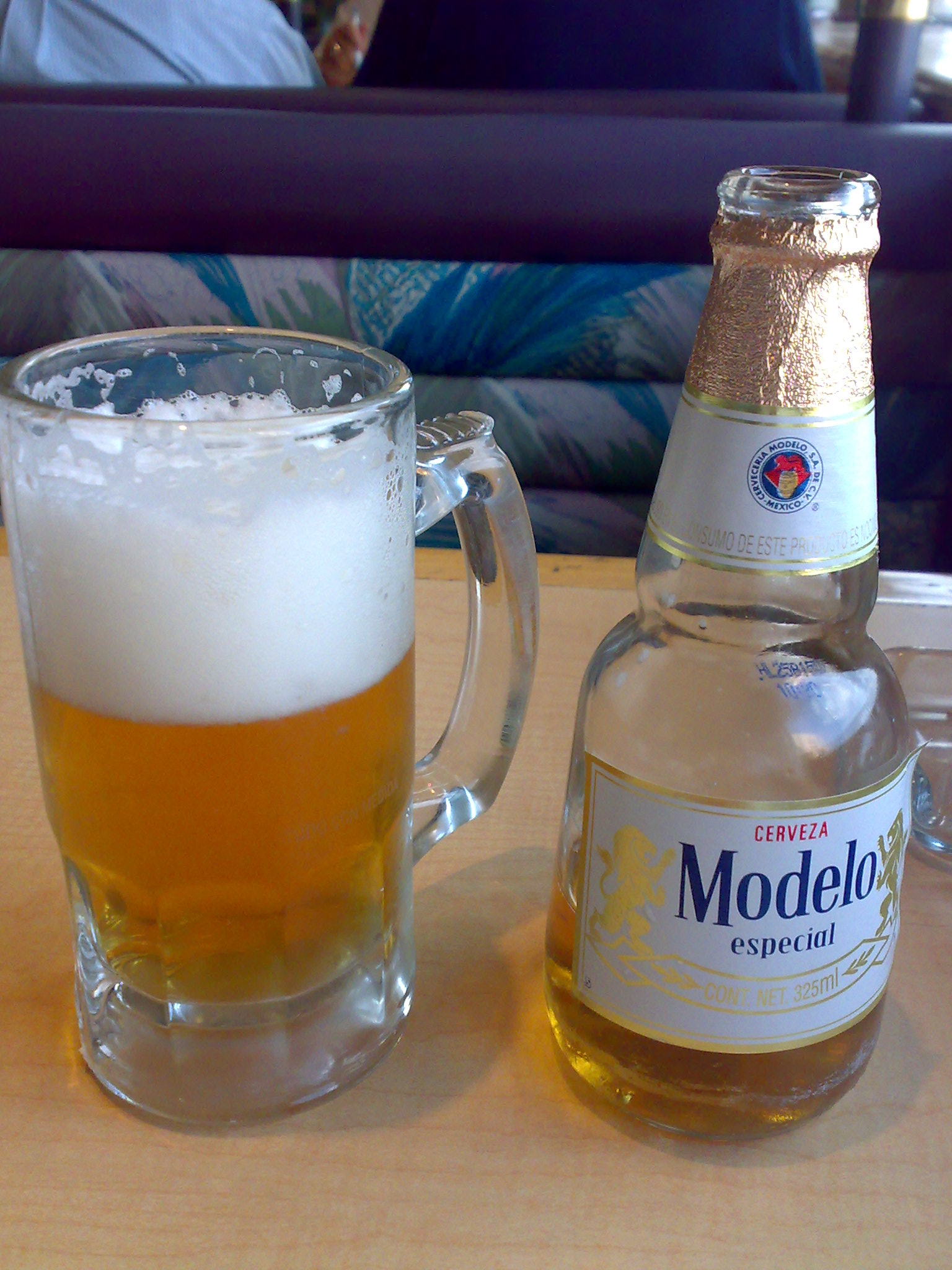
German influence in northern Mexico boosted beer production in the region. Big breweries such as Cuauhtemoc-Moctezuma originated with German immigrants.

Of special interest is the settlement Villa Carlota: that was the name under which two German farming settlements, in the villages of Santa Elena and Pustunich in Yucatán, were founded during the Second Mexican Empire (1864–1867). Villa Carlota attracted a total of 443 German-speaking immigrants, most of them were farmers and artisans who emigrated with their families: the majority came from Prussia and many among them were Protestants. Although in general these immigrants were well received by the hosting society, and the Imperial government honored to the extent of its capabilities the contract it offered to these farmers, the colonies collapsed in 1867. After the disintegration of Villa Carlota as such, some families migrated to other parts of the peninsular, into the United States and back to Germany. Many stayed in Yucatán, where there are descendants of these pioneers with last names such as Worbis, Dietrich and Sols, among others.

As of 2012 there were an estimate of 2,000,000 Mexicans with some partial German ancestry, without counting the ones with total German ancestry, making Mexico the third country with the largest German heritage in Latin America, behind Brazil and Argentina.

==== Irish ====
Commemorative plaque placed at the San Jacinto Square in the district of San Ángel, Mexico City in 1959: "In memory of the Irish soldiers of the heroic St. Patrick's Battalion, martyrs who gave their lives to the Mexican cause in the United States' unjust invasion of 1847"

There is also an Irish-Mexican population in Hidalgo, Veracruz and the northern states. According to INM, in 2009 there were 289 Irish expatriates living in Mexico.

Many Mexican Irish communities existed in Mexican Texas until the revolution. Many Irish then sided with Catholic Mexico against Protestant pro-US elements, forming the Batallón de San Patricio, a battalion of U.S. troops who deserted and fought alongside the Mexican Army against the United States in the Mexican–American War (1846–48). In some cases, Irish immigrants or Americans left from California (the Irish Confederate army of Fort Yuma, Arizona during the U.S. Civil War (1861–65). Álvaro Obregón (O'Brien) was president of Mexico during 1920-24 and Ciudad Obregón and its airport are named in his honor. Actor Anthony Quinn is another famous Mexican of Irish descent. There are also monuments in Mexico City paying tribute to the Irish who fought for Mexico in the 19th century.

==== Italian ====
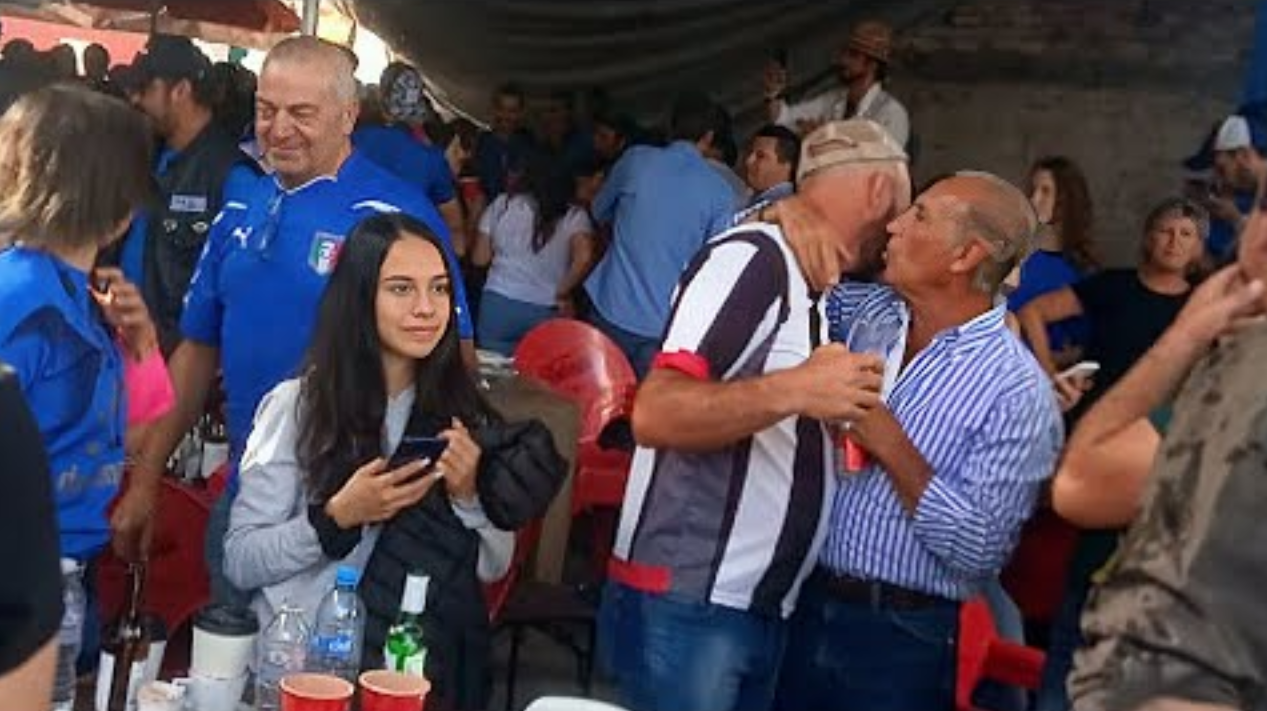
Italian community at Chipilo, Puebla celebrating a football match

There has not been a huge influx of Italians to Mexico compared to other countries such as Brazil, Argentina and the United States. Many minor migration waves are documented however, the earliest probably being as old as the conquest of the Chichimeca lands in the early 16th century.

The most prominent recent wave of migration came from northern Italy and Veneto in the late 19th century, and their descendants today are well assimilated in Mexican society. The town of Chipilo in the state of Puebla (nowadays part of Greater Puebla City) was founded by Italians, and most of its inhabitants still speak the Venetian language together with Spanish. The exact number of Italian descendants is not known, but it is estimated that there around 850,000 Italian Mexicans in the country. As of 2012, 20,000 Italians reside in Mexico

==== Russian ====
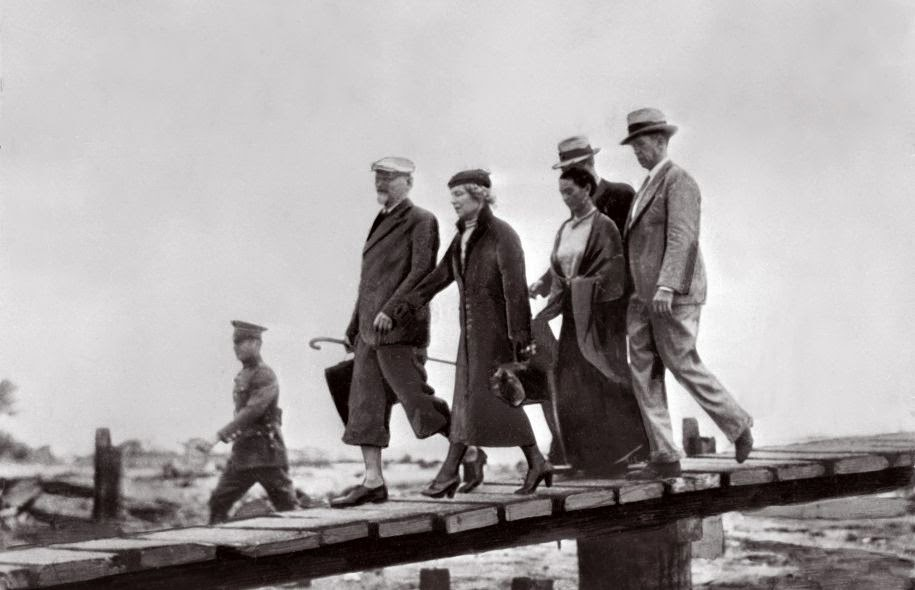
Leon Trotsky arriving with his wife Natalia to Mexico, welcomed by Frida Kahlo

According to INM in 2009 1,396 Russians are living documented in Mexico. According to the Russian embassy, 25,000 reside in Mexico.

Most left Russia during its communist regime (Soviet Union), taking advantage of the Mexican law allowing migrants from communist countries to apply for asylum as soon as they touched Mexican soil, and the ability to become legal residents of Mexico. Leon Trotsky famously moved to Mexico escaping persecution from Stalin, and was eventually murdered at Stalin's behest in Mexico City. The Spiritual Christian Pryguny were a small early 20th century immigrant group to Valle de Guadalupe, Baja California.

==== Spanish and Portuguese ====
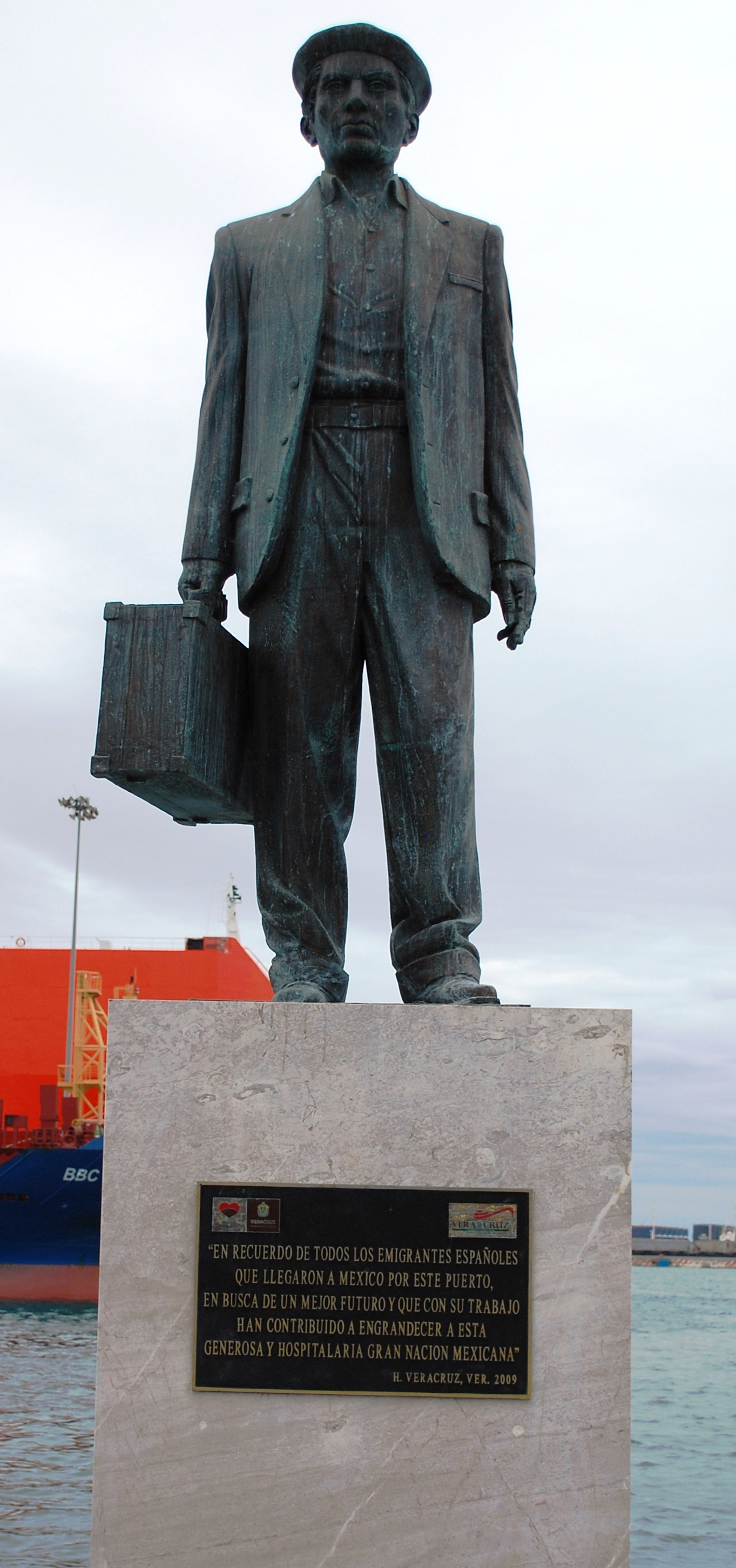
Statue in Veracruz, Veracruz commemorating the Spanish immigrants that arrived as a result of the Spanish Civil War

Spaniards make up the largest group of Europeans in Mexico. Most of them arrived during the 300 years of colonial period and contributed one of the core components of Mexican culture. Genetic studies show that a majority of Mexicans have European ancestry to different extents, most of which is Iberian and dates back to the 16th, 17th and 18th centuries. The second most prominent migration wave is due to the Spanish Civil War (1936–39) and the subsequent Francisco Franco regime (1939–75).

The first Spaniards (and the first Europeans) on record who arrived to the current territory of Mexico are Gonzalo Guerrero and Gerónimo de Aguilar, shipwrecked sailors originally sent from the Dominican Republic to Panamá. They made landfall in 1511 on the Yucatán Peninsula. Both of them were later found by the 1519 expedition of Hernán Cortés. Gerónimo de Aguilar rejoined the Spanish and famously went to become the Yucatec Maya interpreter who helped in the military campaign against the Aztec Empire, whereas Gonzalo Guerrero decided to stay and fight on the side of the Maya against the Spanish.

The expedition of Hernán Cortés included people from Extremadura, Andalusia, Galicia and La Mancha, as well as Muslim converts from Córdoba and Granada. They sailed from Cuba and around the Yucatán Peninsula, the shores of the Gulf of Mexico and then made landfall on Veracruz leading to the conquest of the Aztec Empire and the beginning of New Spain.

Nuño de Guzmán's campaign is another famous early migration wave which included several Spanish and Portuguese families. Guzmán and his followers moved to Mexico under the request of king Charles V in order to counterbalance Cortés' growing power. These people settled and founded virtually all the cities in contemporary North-central and North-Western Mexico, from Guanajuato all the way to Culiacán, between the 1540s and 1580s. By the end of the 16th century, both common and aristocrat people were migrating to Mexico and disseminating through its territory.

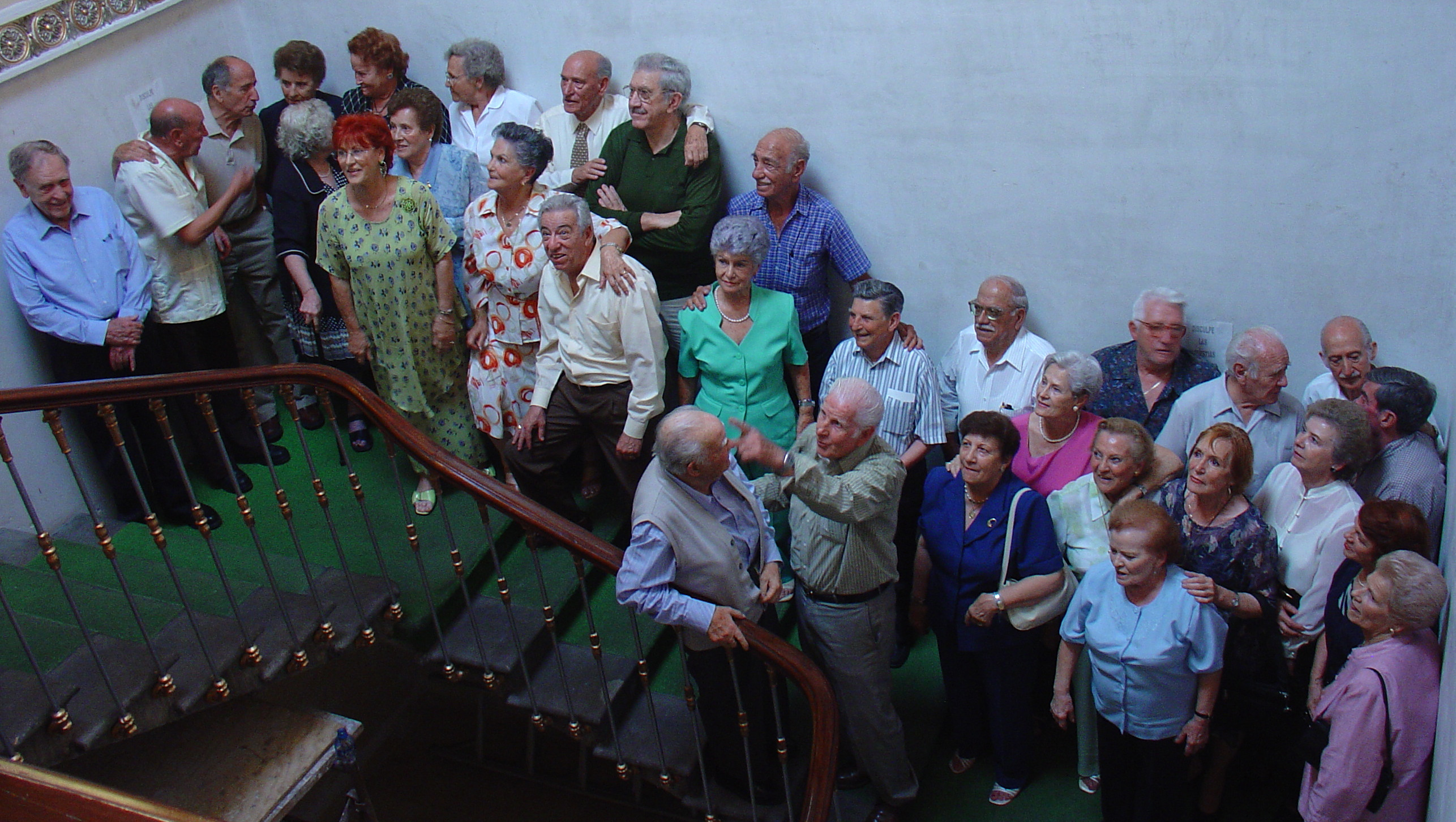
Niños de Morelia (the children of Morelia), originally a group of 456 minors, children of Spanish Republicans who were sent to Mexico in 1937

More recent immigrants came during the Spanish Civil War. From 1940 to 1946 the Spanish Republican government in exile was officially reconstituted in Mexico, and the Mexican government under Lázaro Cárdenas financially supported and gave asylum to the Spanish Republicans. Many went to become famous artists and academics in Mexico, such as artists Luis Buñuel, Remedios Varo, philosopher José Gaos and the Álvarez-Buylla family of scientists. Some of the migrants returned to Spain after the civil war in 1975, but many remained. According to the 2010 census, there were 18,873 Spaniards proper living in Mexico.

Due to the 2008 Financial Crisis and the resulting economic decline and high unemployment in Spain, many Spaniards have been emigrating to Mexico to seek new opportunities. For example, during the last quarter of 2012, a number of 7,630 work permits were granted to Spaniards.

The article on Basque Mexicans covers the large segment of Spaniards and some French immigrants of the Basque ethnic group.

==== Other Europeans ====
The traditional music of Northern Mexico is heavily influenced by polkas and the music of Central Europe.

Small waves of immigrants from Poland, Ukraine and other Eastern European countries (Bulgaria, Hungary, Romania etc.), arrived during the Cold War.

Fewer immigrants came from Belgium, the Netherlands, Switzerland, Cyprus, Greece (see Greek Mexican), Albania, Croatia, Serbia, Czech Republic, Montenegro, Denmark, Norway, Sweden, Finland, Slovakia, Slovenia, North Macedonia, Malta, Portugal and Cape Verde.

Well spoken

== See also ==
- Illegal immigration to Mexico
- Immigration to the United States
- Immigration to Canada
