= Study (film) =

- Theatrical release poster
- Directed by: Paolo Benetazzo
- Written by: Paolo Benetazzo
- Produced by: Paolo Benetazzo
- Starring: Paolo Benetazzo; Aneta Jankowiak; Declan Cassidy; Thibaut Deheuvels
- Cinematography: Paolo Benetazzo
- Edited by: Marco Fantacuzzi
- Production company: ARTtouchesART
- Release date: September 1, 2012 (Portobello Film Festival)
- Running time: 97 minutes
- Countries: Italy, United Kingdom
- Language: English
- Budget: $10,000

Study is a 2012 Italian psychological thriller drama film written, produced, directed by and starring Paolo Benetazzo. It follows a psychology student in the last week before his final exam, discovering his life and exploring his mind. Distinguished by a profound cinematic individualism, the film was made on an extremely low-budget and was entirely shot by Benetazzo without any film crew.

Study has been screened and awarded at several international film festivals including the California Film Awards, Portobello Film Festival, Indie Fest, Cyprus International Film Festival. The film has since developed a cult following among fans and audience.

== Plot ==
Starts on Monday, in the middle of his room, a student (Paolo Benetazzo) tries to study surrounded by his past and his present, obsessed by the concept of life and death, and tortured by the eternal struggle between science and religion. Each day is a distinct representation of how the student's behavior can be influenced by interpersonal relationships and subsequently by society. His consciousness is revealed through a combination of memories, emotions and motivations in a six-day span, while one day is entirely focused on his unconscious cognitive processes. As the days go by, unexpected characters and situations interfere with the student, turning what was meant to be a regular week of study into a complete nightmare.

== Production ==
Study is Paolo Benetazzo's feature film directorial debut. Fascinated by the study of psychology and its impact on modern life, Benetazzo decided to explore that connection in a feature film. Once graduated in Psychology he moved to Dublin where he started writing the script.

Filming began in Ireland and went on for a year. The following four years were spent in Italy, in the Venice area, shooting on small sound stages, composing the music and constantly editing. This film, he explains: “comes from a long introspective and experimental work developed over a period of five years. It deals with central concepts in human existence from a psychological point of view.”

The film was produced on a budget of only $10,000. Benetazzo made the entire movie without any film crew. Many scenes were filmed with no one behind the camera. He later stated: “Making this movie was like living a dream in hell: the budget was ridiculous, the film crew was non-existent and I had no connections whatsoever. The experience was so extreme that I thought about quitting in several occasions.” Influenced by unconventional filmmaking techniques, he worked with an open screenplay and used unknown actors, friends and family.

== Soundtrack ==
The film features many pieces of classical music reinterpreted such as Un Sospiro and Piano Concerto No. 2 (Liszt), Funeral March (Chopin) and Nocturne in E minor, Op. posth. 72 (Chopin), Prélude à l'après-midi d'un faune and Arabesque No. 1 by Debussy, L’usignuolo by Respighi, Prelude to Act 1 Lohengrin by Wagner. The film also features different music genres including hard rock, psychedelic rock, new age, funk rock, gothic rock, thrash metal. The original score was composed by Jean Charles Carbone, Roberto Chemello and Paolo Benetazzo.

According to Benetazzo: “Music plays a crucial part in Study. The film does not rely on traditional techniques of narrative cinema. I wanted the film to be a primarily visual and sound experience in which music plays a vital role in evoking specific atmospheres.” The soundtrack album was released on iTunes on October 1, 2013.

== Release ==
Study premiered in London at the Portobello Film Festival on September 1, 2012. It has since gained a cult status, due to underground popularity. The film was released via VHX on January 8, 2015.

== Film Festivals and awards ==
- Portobello Film Festival 2012: Nomination for Audience Award
- California Film Awards 2012: Winner Gold Award
- Accolade Competition 2013: Winner Award of Merit for Feature Film
- Accolade Competition 2013: Winner Award of Merit for Leading Actor
- Los Angeles Movie Awards 2013: Winner Honorable Mention
- SoCal Film Festival 2013: Official Selection
- Columbia Gorge International Film Festival 2014: Official Selection
- Cyprus International Film Festival 2014: Official Selection
