= Study (soundtrack) =

Study Original Soundtrack

Soundtrack album by Various Artists
- Released: 1 October 2013
- Genre: Classical, hard rock, psychedelic rock, new-age, funk rock, gothic rock, thrash metal
- Length: 48:06
- Label: ARTtouchesART
- Producer: Paolo Benetazzo

Study Original Soundtrack is the soundtrack album to the 2012 film, Study. It was released on iTunes on October 1, 2013. The soundtrack uses a variety of musical genres including hard rock, psychedelic rock, new age, funk rock, gothic rock and thrash metal. The original score was composed by Paolo Benetazzo, Roberto Chemello and Jean Charles Carbone.

The soundtrack includes famous pieces of classical music reinterpreted for the film, such as Liszt's Un Sospiro, Chopin's Funeral March and Nocturne in E minor, Op. posth. 72, and Debussy's Arabesque No. 1.

According to the film's director, Paolo Benetazzo, "Music plays a crucial part in Study. The film does not rely on traditional techniques of narrative cinema. I wanted the film to be a primarily visual and sound experience in which music plays a vital role in evoking specific atmospheres."

== Track listing ==
No.	Title	Artist(s)	Length
1.	"Essence (Theme Song)"	Paolo Benetazzo & Roberto Chemello	1:14
2.	"Third Grand Concert Étude (Un Sospiro)"	Cristiano Burato	5:35
3.	"You"	Paolo Benetazzo, Roberto Chemello & Jean Charles Carbone	2:11
4.	"Vertigo in Love"	Jean Charles Carbone	4:39
5.	"666 Tears in Heaven"	Roberto Chemello, Jean Charles Carbone & Paolo Benetazzo	2:42
6.	"In the Sky"	Jean Charles Carbone, Paolo Benetazzo & Roberto Chemello	1:10
7.	"Here I Am"	Roberto Chemello, Paolo Benetazzo & Jean Charles Carbone	2:08
8.	"Piano Sonata No. 2 (Funeral March)"	Gloria De Piante Vicin	2:13
9.	"Nocturne in E minor, Op. posth. 72 (Chopin)"	Gloria De Piante Vicin	3:55
10.	"Arabesque No. 1"	Gloria De Piante Vicin	4:19
11.	"Cat and Lion"	Paolo Benetazzo & Roberto Chemello	3:26
12.	"Underground Panic"	Paolo Benetazzo & Roberto Chemello	5:42
13.	"Uneven"	Roberto Chemello, Paolo Benetazzo & Jean Charles Carbone	4:15
14.	"Blue Flight"	Jean Charles Carbone, Paolo Benetazzo & Roberto Chemello	3:15
15.	"Drop of Blood"	Roberto Chemello & Paolo Benetazzo	1:32
16.	"Walking Shadows"	Paolo Benetazzo & Roberto Chemello	2:27
17.	"Destruction"	Paolo Benetazzo & Roberto Chemello	0:57

== Additional music ==
These classical pieces are used in the film, but are not included on the soundtrack album.

1. Piano Concerto No. 2 (1st movement) - Franz Liszt
2. L’usignuolo - Ottorino Respighi
3. Prélude à l'après-midi d'un faune - Claude Debussy
4. Prelude to Act 1 Lohengrin - Richard Wagner
