= Paolo Benetazzo =

Italian film director (born 1976)

- Born: 16 July 1976 (age 50); Vicenza, Veneto, Italy
- Education: University of Padua
- Occupations: Film director, film producer, screenwriter, editor, actor, visual artist
- Years active: 2007-present
- Website: www.paolobenetazzo.com

Paolo Benetazzo (born 16 July 1976) is an Italian film director, actor, screenwriter, producer, editor and visual artist. He made his feature film directorial debut with Study (2012), which has been screened and awarded at international film festivals worldwide. Distinguished by a profound cinematic individualism, the film was entirely shot by Benetazzo without any film crew. He is the founder of independent film production company ARTtouchesART.

== Early life and education ==
Benetazzo was born in Vicenza, Veneto, Italy. At the age of 19 he began acting and filming while attending the University of Padua. Experiencing a temporary conflict with the academic environment, he interrupted his studies for some years, picking up different jobs, until he eventually graduated in 2003 with a master's degree in psychology.

== Career ==
In 2007 after travelling around Europe and living in Dublin for a few years, Benetazzo started working on his feature film directorial debut. Discouraged by the Italian film industry, he moved to London and founded ARTtouchesART Films in 2012.

Between 2007 and 2012 he wrote, produced, photographed and directed the independent film Study. He also starred in the lead role and composed the soundtrack. Since its premiere in London in 2012, the film has quickly developed a cult following among fans and audience.

At the end of 2012 Benetazzo worked with artist Danny Sherwood in the production of "Bitter Ditty". In 2013 he directed and edited the music video "Salamander" for rock band Mount Fabric and "Like to Party" for electronic producer Cal Strange. During the same year he also directed the short film Sense, which was selected in a number of film festivals including the Seattle Erotic Art Festival. In 2015 Benetazzo directed the music video "Love me Hurt me" for French artist Oriana Curls.

== Filmography ==
=== Feature films ===
Year	Title	Role	Film Festivals and awards
2012	Study	Actor (The student); Director; Writer; Producer	Portobello Film Festival 2012: Nomination for Audience Award; California Film Awards 2012: Winner Gold Award; Accolade Competition 2013: Winner Award of Merit for Feature Film; Accolade Competition 2013: Winner Award of Merit for Leading Actor; Los Angeles Movie Awards 2013: Winner Honorable Mention; SoCal Film Festival 2013: Official Selection; Columbia Gorge International Film Festival 2014: Official Selection; Cyprus International Film Festival 2014: Official Selection

=== Short films ===
Year	Title	Role	Film Festivals and awards
2013	Sense	Director; Writer; Producer; Editor	Bad Film Fest 2014: Award Winner; Seattle Erotic Art Festival 2014: Official Selection; Chéries-Chéris Film Festival 2014: Official Selection; Nachtschatten Film Festival 2015: Official Selection; Rural FilmFest 2015: Official Selection

=== Music videos ===
Year	Title	Artist	Role	Film Festivals
2012	"Bitter Ditty"	Danny Sherwood	Director; Writer; Editor	Art All Night Film Festival 2014: Official Selection; Rendezvous Film Festival 2015: Official Selection
2013	"Like to Party"	Cal Strange	Director; Writer; Editor	BBC Music Video Festival 2013: Official Selection; SouthEastern Film Festival 2015: Official Selection; Art All Night Film Festival 2015: Official Selection
2013	"Salamander"	Mount Fabric	Director; Writer; Editor	Reel 13: Official Selection; Three Cities Film Festival: Official Selection 2015; SouthEastern Film Festival 2015: Official Selection

== Discography ==
=== Albums ===
Year	Title	Role
2012	Study Original Soundtrack	Producer; Music composer
