= Sex-positive movement =

Ideology supporting healthy sexual norms

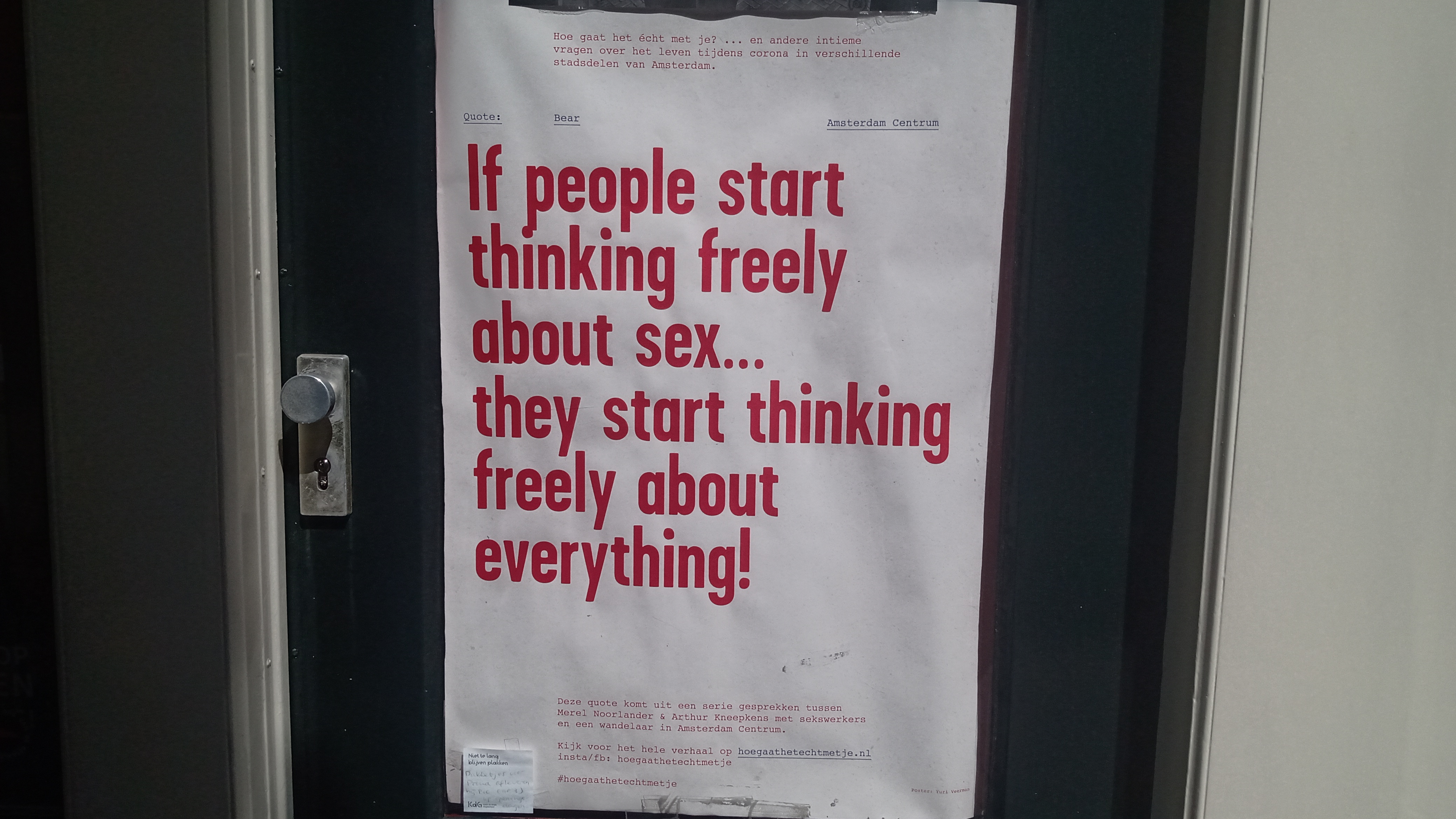
A sex positive poster in Amsterdam (2021)

The sex-positive movement is a social and philosophical movement that seeks to change cultural attitudes and norms around sexuality, promoting the recognition of sexuality (in the countless forms of expression) as a natural and healthy part of the human experience and emphasizing the importance of personal sovereignty, safer sex practices, and consensual sex (free from violence or coercion). It is based on the idea that "sexuality is an important part of the human experience and it deserves respect." Although the definition of the term greatly varies among those involved in the movement, its central notion is "openness to a variety of sexual orientations, interests (or lack thereof), identities and expressions." The sex-positive movement also advocates for comprehensive sex education and safe sex as part of its campaign. The movement generally makes no moral distinctions among types of sexual activities, regarding these choices as matters of personal preference.

== Overview ==
The terms and concepts of sex-positive (German: sexuell positiv) (or, alternately sex-affirmative (sexuell bejahend)) and sex-negative (sexuell negativ) are generally attributed to Wilhelm Reich. His hypothesis was that some societies view the sexual expression as essentially good and healthy, while others have a generally negative view of sexuality and seek to repress and control libido. Other terms used to describe this concept include pro-sex or pro-sexuality.

The sex-positive movement does not, in general, make moral or ethical distinctions between heterosexual or homosexual sex, or masturbation, regarding these choices as matters of personal preference. Other sex-positive positions include acceptance of BDSM and polyamory as well as asexuality.

Some sex-positive theorists have analyzed sex-positivity in terms of the intersection of race/culture, gender, sexuality, class, nationality, and spirituality. Because of the vastness of the sex-positivity movement, it has been challenging for people to reach an agreed-upon definition of the term "sex-positivity". Several definitions of sex-positivity have been offered by sexologist Carol Queen:

Sex-positive, a term that's coming into cultural awareness, isn't a dippy love-child celebration of orgone—it's a simple yet radical affirmation that we each grow our own passions on a different medium, that instead of having two or three or even half a dozen sexual orientations, we should be thinking in terms of millions. "Sex-positive" respects each of our unique sexual profiles, even as we acknowledge that some of us have been damaged by a culture that tries to eradicate sexual differences and possibilities.

It's the cultural philosophy that understands sexuality as a potentially positive force in one's life, and it can, of course, be contrasted with sex-negativity, which sees sex as problematic, disruptive, and dangerous. Sex-positivity allows for and in fact celebrates sexual diversity, differing desires and relationships structures, and individual choices based on consent.

== History ==
Calls for tolerance of sexual activity outside the established norms of the Western world have been present since antiquity. Commenting on the story of Pyramus and Thisbe, the humanist Giovanni Boccaccio wrote in the 14th century:

The passion of unbridled activity is the passion of desire, and is almost a plague and common crime among the young; in which—ah!—it must be tolerated with a patient mind, since it is so by the will of nature, that while we are able we voluntarily incline to procreation, lest the human race fall into defect if intercourse is postponed until old age.

A modern phenomenon, the term sexual liberation is used to describe a socio-political movement, witnessed from the 1960s into the 1970s. However, the term has been used at least since the late 1920s and is often attributed as being influenced by Freud's writing on sexual liberation and psychosexual issues, as well as Wilhelm Reich, who originally coined the term.

During the 1960s, a shift in the ways people thought about sexuality began to take place, heralding a period of de-conditioning in some circles away from old world antecedents, and developing new codes of sexual behavior, many of which have since been integrated into the mainstream.

The 1960s also heralded a new culture of "free love" with millions of young people embracing the hippie ethos and preaching the power of love and the beauty of sex as a natural part of ordinary life. Hippies believed that sex and sexuality were natural biological phenomena that should be neither denied nor repressed. Changes in attitudes reflected a perception that traditional views on sexuality were both hypocritical and male-chauvinistic.

Sexual liberalization heralded a new ethos in experimenting with open sex in and outside of marriage, contraception and the pill, public nudity, gay liberation, legalized abortion, interracial marriage, a return to natural childbirth, women's rights, and feminism.

Historian David Allyn argues that the sexual revolution was a time of "coming-out": about premarital sex, masturbation, erotic fantasies, pornography use, and sexuality.

The term sex-positive first came into use in the United States in the late 1990s with the founding of the Center for Sex and Culture in San Francisco, California, and The Center for Sex Positive Culture in Seattle, Washington. In 2009, Sex Positive World began in Portland, Oregon. As of 2019, there are more than sixteen chapters of the nonprofit, in five countries.

== Sex-positive feminism ==
Sex-positive feminism, also known as pro-sex feminism, sex-radical feminism, or sexually liberal feminism, is a movement that began in the early 1980s. In the 1970s, the second-wave feminist movement emerged, characterized by its opposition to pornography, sex work, and BDSM, known and referred to as sex-negative or antiporn viewpoints.

Some became involved in the sex-positive feminist movement in response to efforts by anti-pornography feminists, such as Catharine MacKinnon and Dorchen Leidholdt, to put pornography at the center of a feminist explanation of women's oppression. Andrea Dworkin and Robin Morgan held the belief as anti-pornography feminists that the degradation and objectification of women's bodies fostered ideas of sexual violence and assault. This period of intense debate and acrimony between sex-positive and anti-pornography feminists during the early 1980s is often referred to as the "Feminist Sex Wars". Other sex-positive feminists became involved, not in opposition to other feminists, but in direct response to what they saw as patriarchal control of sexuality. Some authors who have advocated sex-positive feminism include Erika Lust, Ellen Willis, Susie Bright, Patrick Califia, Gayle Rubin, Carol Queen, Avedon Carol, Tristan Taormino, Diana Cage, Nina Hartley, Amia Srinivasan, Mireille Miller-Young, and Betty Dodson.

Sex-positive feminism emphasizes the importance of women's right to explore their bodies, sexual desire, and believes that sexual violence does not have to prevent the vindication of female desire. This movement demands the preservation of freedom and is against norms that are present in the sexual sphere. It also encourages and demands respect for variety and sexual dissidence without allowing itself to be harmed by intense anti-sex pressure from critics.

Sex-positive feminism considers that the discourse on women's sexual pleasure is silenced and marginalized in today's world. Suppressing sexual dialogue with the supposed purpose of protecting women will only make them appear, according to this perspective, as the weaker sex. Women could have difficulty defending themselves with the classification as victims. Over time, women have been classified as sexually passive, while men are recognized as sexually aggressive, so intercourse is considered an activity in which women "submit" to men's desire. Another factor that continues to minimize female desire is the lack of consensus and research on it, a product of the social repression that women have had to endure over the centuries, which has led to prejudices and generalizations.

Shere Hite, a sex educator and feminist, challenged misconceptions about female sexuality, and supported feminine sexual liberation and the right for individuals to freely express and explore their sexuality without judgement or repression. As demonstrated in her work, "The Hite Report: A Nationwide Study of Female Sexuality" (1976), she countered Freudian beliefs asserting that women were capable of experiencing sexual pleasure independently, without the need for intercourse. However, Hite faced antifeminist backlash due to her statistical methods of collecting data, demonstrating bias, and therefore the book became largely controversial and threatening to certain parties of men.

Sex-positive feminists believe that sexual hierarchy system places heterosexuality, marriage and procreation at the top, which causes many women to fear the sexual system that predominates in today's world. Pleasure and sexuality are human rights that have been subjugated by an old-fashioned patriarchal social construction. Pro-sex feminism endeavors to cultivate sexuality as a site of political resistance. By using the "pleasure" factor in their favor, a significant contribution to the contemporary queer theory and politics has been made by using sexual and feminist empowerment.

== Empowering perspectives ==
=== Sex-positive education for youth ===
The sex-positive movement is also concerned with the teaching of comprehensive and accurate sex education in schools. Programs such as the "Abstinence Education Grant Program" (AEGP) teach abstinence as the healthy way to approach one's sexual desires and to avoid sexually transmitted infections such as HIV/AIDS. However, in May 2021, The Real Education and Access for Healthy Youth Act (REAHYA) introduced federal grants aimed to encompass truthful, and inclusive sex education for the youth. It seeks to put an end to federal funding for the Title V state grant program, which promotes the abstinence-until-marriage ideology, which could be detrimental for early education. The A-H guidelines from Title V of the Social Security Act convey a distinct perspective that places the notion that engaging in sexual activity exclusively within the context of marriage is the only acceptable behavior (excluding LGBT individuals), supporting the abstinence-only-until-marriage programs. The movement seeks to promote a healthier view for youth to understand the open, honest, non-judgemental, accepting approach to learning and teaching about sex positivity.

=== Sex work industry ===
The sex work industry encompasses pornography, prostitution (escort services, massage parlors, and brothels), cybersex services, exotic dancing, and online nude modeling. About 40 to 42 million women globally are involved in the sex work industry; however, estimates of the number of LGBT sex workers are often not accounted for. Feminist, queer, and human rights scholars use the term sex work to emphasize the economic choices made when entering the sex labor industry, regardless of legal status and gender identity. The complexity of the sex work industry excludes the workers from protection provided by international, federal, and state regulations, making the rights of sex workers fundamental human rights.

Sex workers require protection against pimps and criminal syndicates who easily take advantage of their earnings, and also require protection from violence, discrimination, social marginalization, and easier access to healthcare and housing services. Sex workers are frequently subjected to criminalization, while usually the men involved, as either consumers or controllers of labor, walk away unpunished. There are differing conversations between feminists, queer scholars, activists, and practitioners' opinions of whether sex work should be decriminalized, legalized, and/or unionized. They all agree that the power dynamics inherent in the social constructs of gender, race, class, age, sexuality, and nationality generate economic conditions that force sex workers to operate and make a living within violently patriarchal and capitalist frameworks.

=== Consent culture ===
The sex-positive movement emphasizes and supports the importance of consent in sexual encounters. Consent is the first and most basic form of respect between people when engaging in sexual activities. The negotiation and form of communication when discussing consent is the most important aspect when promoting healthy sexual relationships. Consent culture promotes affirmative consent, encourages enthusiastic consent, and the importance of consent education to foster healthy and respectful sexual relations. Consent gives a way to articulate and legitimize our moral judgments in public.

Affirmative consent describes the explicit, informed, and voluntary assent to engage in sexual behavior. Anyone engaging in sexual interactions is responsible for making sure that the other party or parties have given their direct consent without hesitation. Absence of protest, words, or action does not mean consent, and silence will never be a form of consent. There should be no expectation of protest or opposition.

A positive expression of consent is the main focus of enthusiastic consent. Invoking enthusiastic consent entails focusing on the presence of a "yes" as opposed to the absence of a "no". It can be communicated vocally or nonverbally using encouraging body language. These include nodding, maintaining eye contact, and smiling, as examples of body language. It is significant to remember that while these may imply consent, they do not represent explicit affirmative consent, and one must always get verbal confirmation. The key to maintaining a healthy sexual relationship and consent is to regularly check in with one's partner or partners to make sure they are comfortable and that their opinions have not changed.

=== Intersectionality ===
Intersectionality within the sex-positive movement strives to recognize complex identities, inclusiveness, regardless of social categories of gender, class, race, and sexuality. It lacks the inclusion of race and ethnicity, disability, gender, gender identity, sexual orientation, and status. The sex-positive movement strives to move towards incorporating cultural diversity, and taking into account the variety in sexual practices as well as sexual minorities and other marginalized or oppressed identities. Positive sexuality compasses the well-being and happiness of an individual, individuality in sexuality, embracing multiple ways of knowing and learning, professional ethics, open and honest communication, peacemaking, while being applicable to all levels of social structure.

Sex-positivity was established and rooted from a Western perspective. Much of the current sex-positive frameworks is concentrated on the educated, industrialized, prosperous, and democratic populations, neglecting the idea of intersectionality and marginalized groups.

== Criticism ==
In opposition, some feminists believe sex-positivity perceives disadvantage in women but makes them easier to oppress. A large religious—particularly Abrahamic—conservative opposition to sex-positivity sees human sexuality as a destructive force except under the contract of a marriage. Sexual acts are ranked hierarchically, with marital heterosexuality at the top of the hierarchy and masturbation, homosexuality, and other sexualities that deviate from societal expectations closer to the bottom. Medicine and psychiatry are said to have also contributed to sex-negativity, as they may designate some forms of sexuality that appear on the bottom of this hierarchy as being pathological (see mental illness).

Multiple feminists, such as Verkerk, Glick, and Bauer, have criticized iterations of sex-positivity due to concerns about its effectiveness in challenging patriarchal norms. These feminists insist they are "sex-critical" rather than "sex-negative". Sex-positive feminism has also been criticized for its alleged emphasis on defeating the patriarchal gender norms through personal life choices, "rather than to dismantle, critique, expose, or challenge systematic discrimination and violence."

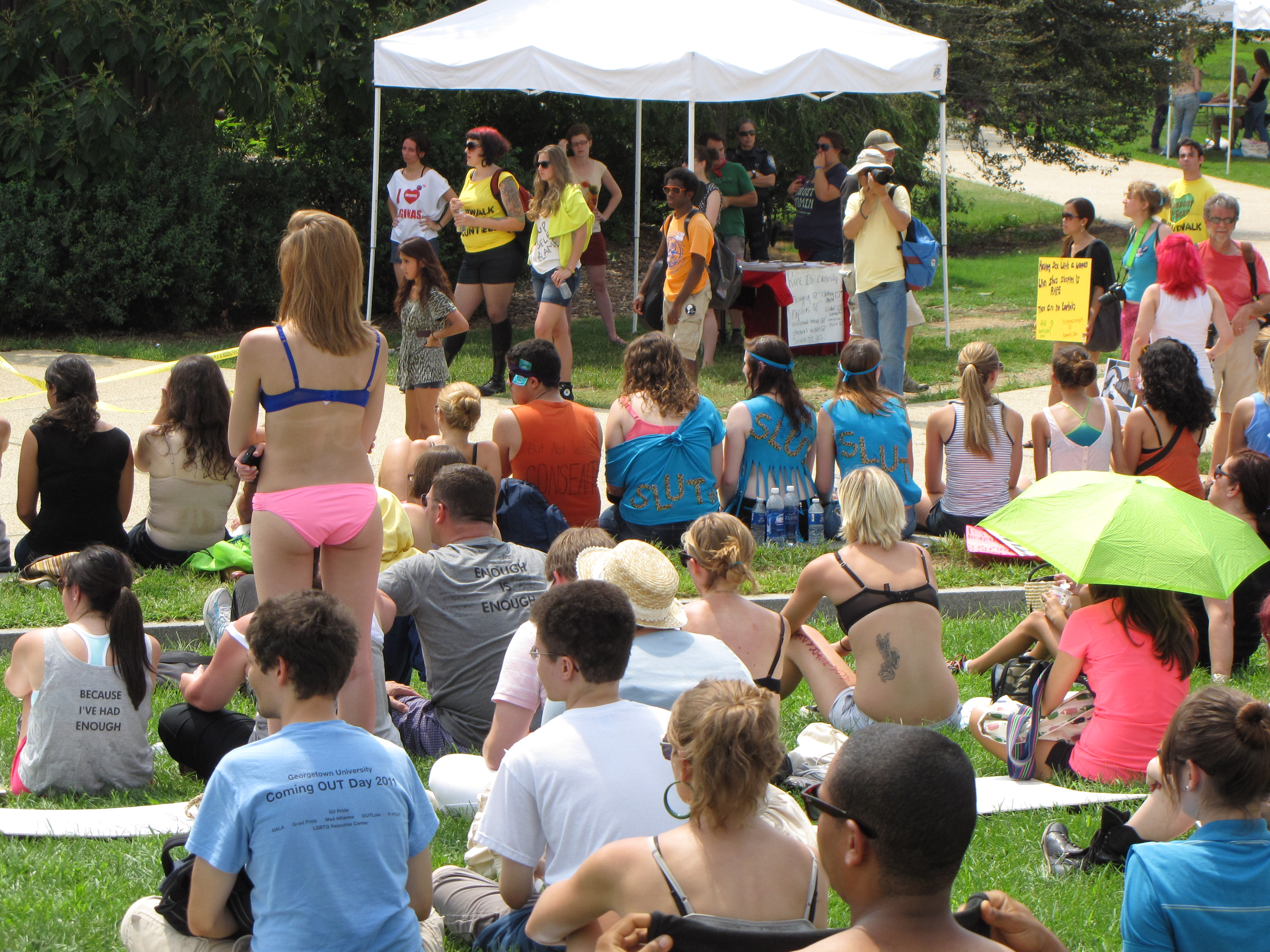
SlutWalk DC 2012

The SlutWalk has received criticism of its effectiveness as an activist event. SlutWalk's purpose is to reclaim the word "slut" and counteract victim-blaming. Despite the aim of the SlutWalk, critics claim that the word "slut" has not been reclaimed. Rather, the word slut had become reified. Critics of the SlutWalk also suggest that the alleged focus on revealing clothing "ultimately displace[s] the sombre and deadly issues of rape, domestic violence, sexual abuse, and street harassment". Lastly, the SlutWalk received criticism for alleged lack of consideration of the hyper-sexualization that women of colour face. Black Women's Blueprint wrote an open letter to the SlutWalk claiming that Black women cannot "afford to label" themselves as those in the SlutWalk do.

== In the 21st century ==
Since the early 2000s, the sex-positivity movement has continued to move closer into the mainstream. The advent of social media has made the sex-positivity movement more accessible by giving advocates of the movement platforms to promote their beliefs to a wide audience of followers. By extending the reach of the movement, sex-positivity has come to be inclusive of all sorts of sex and sexuality. Shaming has become an area of particular interest within the sex-positivity movement, encouraging people to be more open and accepting of the different experiences people have with sex and sexuality. Slut-shaming, prude-shaming and kink-shaming have all been challenged by the sex-positivity movement in an effort to allow all people to feel supported by and included in the movement.

=== Online sex-positive communities ===
Platforms such as Twitter, Facebook, Reddit, and Tumblr have curated large communities of sex-positive groups, inviting and creating easily accessible places for people to join. Additionally, there has been a rapid increase in sex-positive fetish digital apps promoting BDSM kink such as Ferly, Feeld, Bloom now Plura, and #open. Events held annually like the Shinto Kanamara Matsuri, Folsom Street Fair, Sexpo, Really Good Sex Festival, invite and promote the sex-positive community to the public, attracting tourists and media coverage from around the world.

Cybersex has become popular with the advancement of technology due to the increased accessibility to the internet. The visibility of male sexual services on the internet and websites catering male escorts has also increased due to the preference for the privacy and anonymity that cybersex offers as an online service. This has benefited the male sex industry, especially for gay social spaces that often feel discomforting in traditional settings.

=== Sex-positive parties and clubs ===
Sex-positive events are not the same as sex parties: sex is allowed but not the main focus of the event. Fetish clothing is common, which is a mandatory dress code in many cases. Such party series and clubs, e.g. Torture Garden in London, Wasteland in Amsterdam, KitKatClub, German Fetish Ball and House of Lunacy in Berlin, Freedom Fetish party and Ministry of Freedom club in Budapest.

=== Mainstream media ===
Pop culture has also played a large role in bringing the sex-positivity movement into the mainstream. Celebrities, including Lady Gaga, Amber Rose, Jessica Biel, Cameron Diaz, Taylor Swift and many others, have spoken publicly about their experiences with slut-shaming, sexuality, sexual assault, body acceptance and overall sexual health and responsibility.

In recent years, sex-positive concepts have found their way into dance clubs through sex-positive parties in cities like Berlin and Vienna. Sex-positive podcasts like You Came First with Meghan Barton Hanson, Sex with Emily, and Sexology, along with social media content on platforms like TikTok and YouTube, have been increasingly popular, attracting and specifically targeting a younger audience who engage in open discussions and foster conversations about being sex-positive and personal sexual experiences.

== See also ==
- Center for Sex Positive Culture
- Comprehensive sex education
- Decriminalization of sex work
- Free love
- Free the nipple
- Human sexual activity
- Human sexuality
- Love-in
- Positive youth development
- Relationship anarchy
- Sex workers' rights
- Sexecology
- Sex-positive feminism
- Sexual and reproductive health and rights
- Sexual Freedom Awards
- Sexual revolution
- Topfreedom
