= Study =

Study or studies may refer to:

== General ==
- Education
  - Higher education
- Clinical trial
- Experiment
- Field of study
- Observational study
- Scientific study
- Research
- Study skills, abilities and approaches applied to learning

== Other ==
- Study (art), a drawing or series of drawings done in preparation for a finished piece
- Study (film), 2012, by Paolo Benetazzo
- Study (Flandrin), an 1835/36 painting by Hippolyte Flandrin
- Study (room), a room in a home used as an office or library
- Study (soundtrack), from the 2012 film
- The Study, a private all-girls school in Westmount, Quebec, Canada
- Studies (journal), published by the Jesuits in Ireland
- Eduard Study (1862–1930), German mathematician
- Facebook Study, a market research app

== See also ==
- Étude, a short musical composition
- Studie
