= Antiochian Greek Christians =

Christian ethnoreligious group in the Levant

Antiochian Greek Christians الروم الأنطاكيون Ρωμιοί της Αντιοχείας
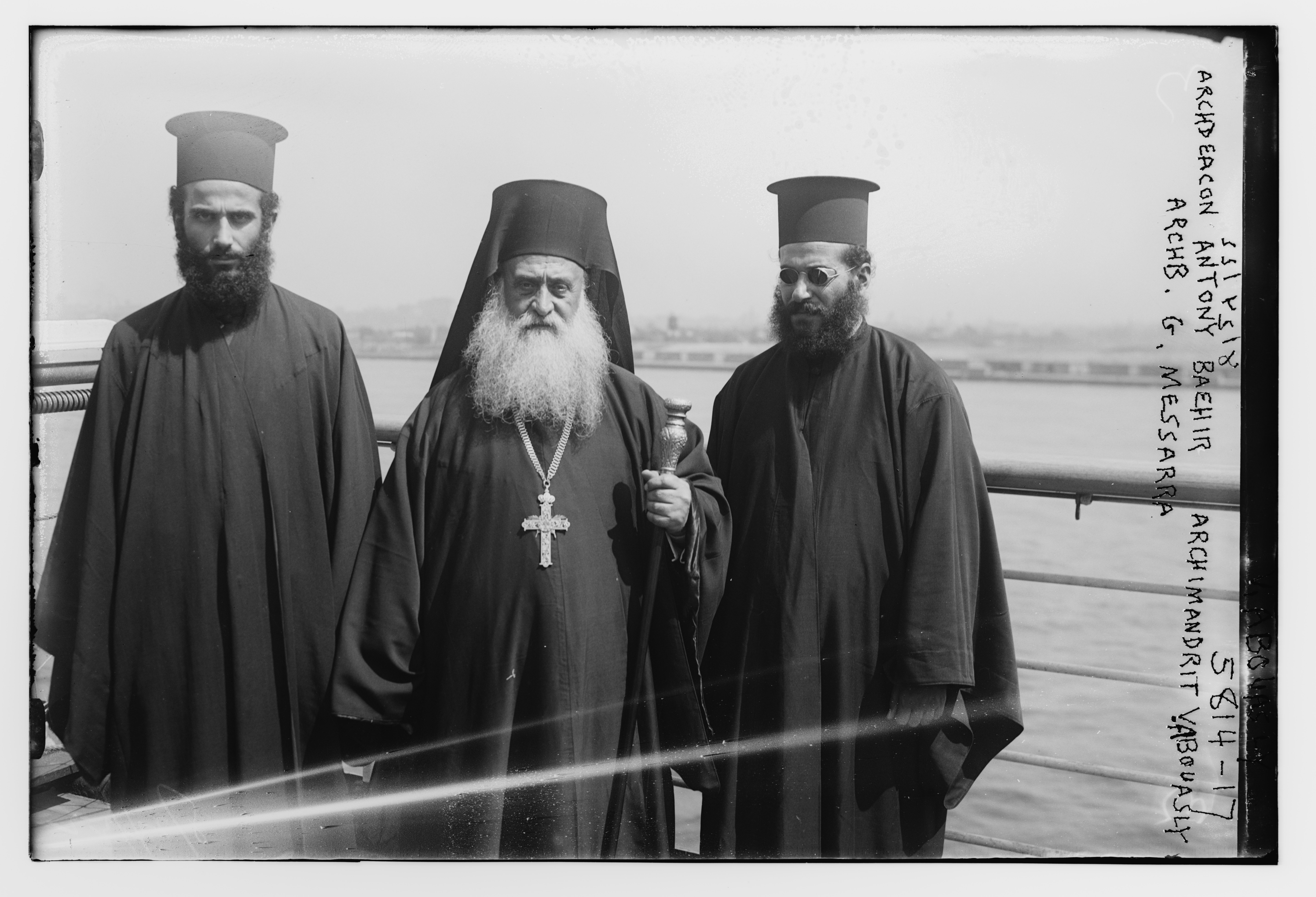
- Founders of the Antiochian Orthodox Archdiocese of North America (left to right: then-Archdeacon Anthony Bashir, Metropolitan Gerasimos Messara, and Archimandrite Victor Abo-Assaley)

Total population
- Estimated 2 to 3 million

Religions
- Christianity (Greek Orthodox Church of Antioch and Melkite Greek Catholic Church)

Languages
- Vernacular: Majority Arabic (Levantine Arabic), Western Neo-Aramaic in Maaloula, Turkish in Turkey, Medieval Greek (historical); Liturgical: Koine Greek (historical), Classical Arabic (current) and Classical Syriac (historical)

Antiochian Greek Christians, also called Rūm, are an ethnoreligious Eastern Christian group native to the Levant.

Most of its members identify as Arab, although some reject the Arab label and instead identify as Levantine Greek. They are either members of the Greek Orthodox Church of Antioch or the Melkite Greek Catholic Church, and they have ancient roots in what is now Syria, Lebanon, Israel, Palestine, Jordan, the southern Turkish province of Hatay, which includes the city of Antakya (ancient Antioch). Many of their descendants now live in the global Near Eastern Christian diaspora. They primarily speak Levantine Arabic, with Maaloula near Damascus being one of the few places where a Western Aramaic dialect is still spoken. A recent study by Daniel E. Platt and his team, labeled Anatolian genetic ancestry in North Lebanese populations, found that the Greek Orthodox in the Koura District are genetically very similar to Byzantine and ancient Anatolians rather than just being Canaanites.

== History ==
=== Early Era ===
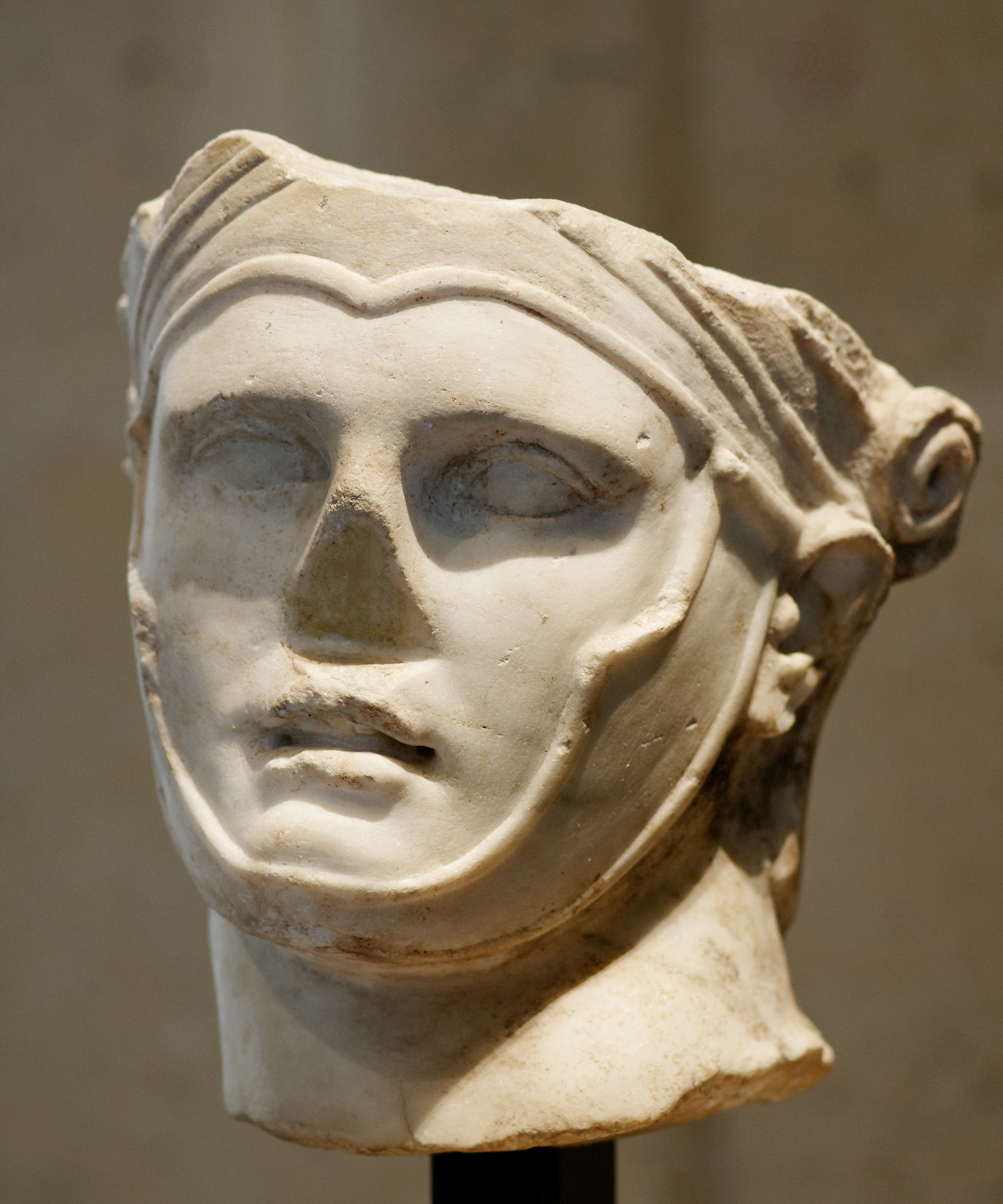
Seleucus I Nicator (305–281 BC), Macedonian officer under Alexander the Great and founder of Antioch

Syria was invaded by Greek king Alexander the Great in 333 B.C. and Antioch was founded by one of his generals, Seleucus I Nicator. This conquest allowed for Hellenistic ideals from Anatolia to promulgate in the Levant through migration, prior to the rise of Christianity.

=== Roman Era ===
Syria was annexed by the Roman Republic in 64 B.C., by Pompey in the Third Mithridatic War. Christianity spread in the region and dominated by the fourth century.

=== Byzantine Era ===
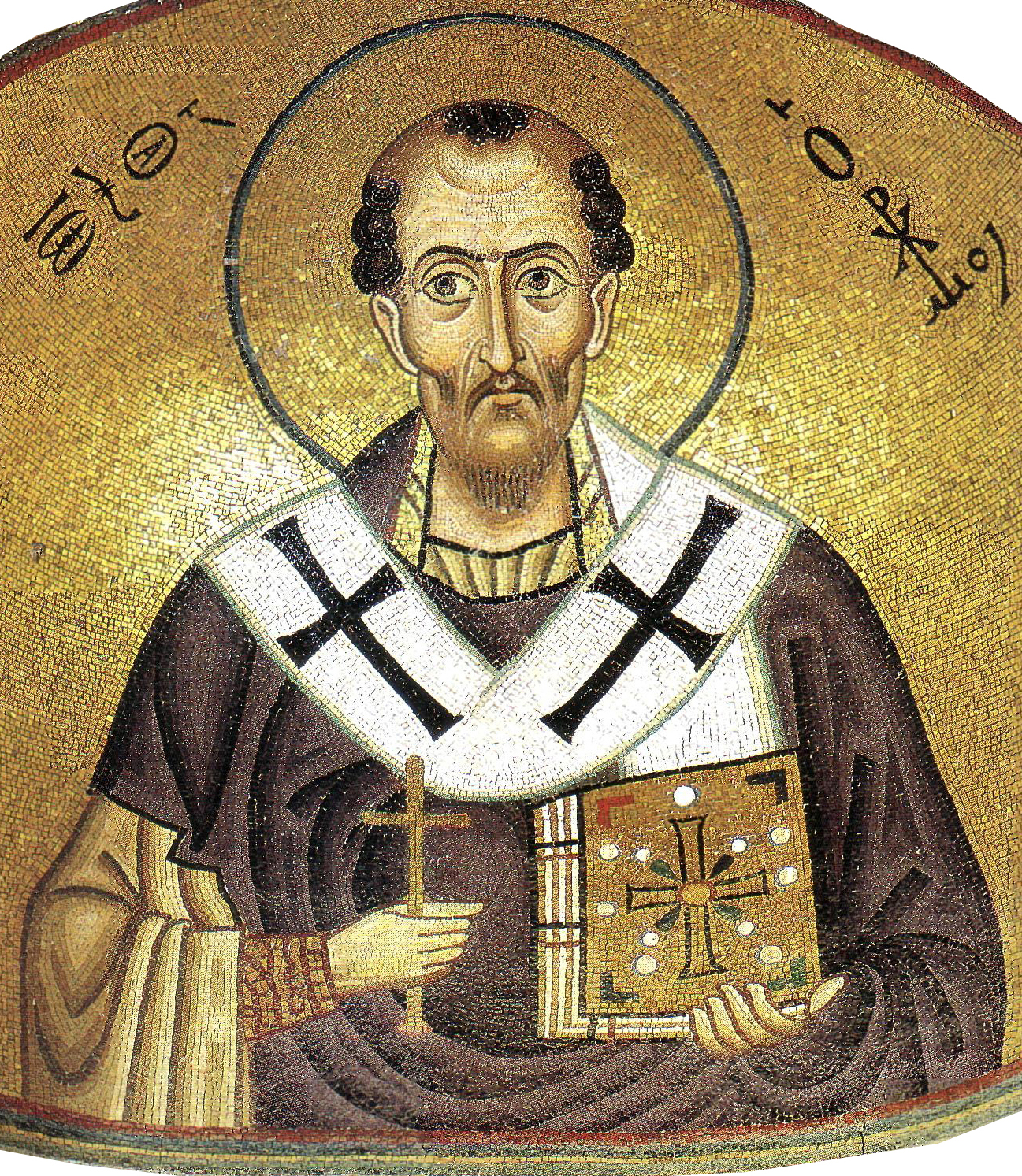
John Chrysostom (347–407 AD) was an early Church Father, Archbishop of Constantinople, and Christian saint born in Antioch

Throughout the Middle Ages, Byzantine Greeks self-identified as Romaioi or Romioi (Greek: Ῥωμαῖοι, Ρωμιοί, meaning "Romans") and Graikoi (Γραικοί, meaning "Greeks"). Linguistically, they spoke Byzantine or Medieval Greek, known as "Romaic," which is situated between the Hellenistic (Koine) and modern phases of the language. Byzantines perceived themselves as the descendants of Classical Greeks, the political heirs of imperial Rome, and followers of the Apostles. Thus, their sense of "Romanity" was different from that of their contemporaries in the West. "Romaic" was the name of the vulgar Greek language, as opposed to "Hellenic" which was its literary or doctrinal form.

The homeland of the Antiochians, known as the Diocese of the East, was one of the major commercial, agricultural, religious, and intellectual areas of the Empire, and its strategic location facing the Sassanid Empire and the unruly desert tribes gave it exceptional military importance. The entire area of the former diocese came under Sassanid occupation between 609 and 628, but was retaken by the Emperor Heraclius until it was lost to the Arabs after the Battle of Yarmouk, and the fall of Antioch.

=== Arab Conquest ===
Further Information:Muslim conquest of the Levant, Arab–Byzantine wars

The Arab conquest of Syria occurred in the first half of the 7th century, and refers to the conquest of the Levant, which later became known as the Islamic Province of Bilad al-Sham. On the eve of the Arab Muslim conquests the Byzantines were still in the process of rebuilding their authority in the Levant, which had been lost to them for almost twenty years. At the time of the Arab conquest, Bilad al-Sham was inhabited mainly by Syrian Christian sects, Ghassanid and other local Arab tribes and Nabatean Arabs, as well as Greeks, and by non-Christian minorities of Jews, Samaritans, and Itureans Arabs. The population of the region did not become predominantly Muslim until the 17th century, a millennium after the initial Arab conquest.

==== In Southern Levant ====
The Muslim Arab army attacked Jerusalem, held by the Byzantines, in November, 636. For four months the siege continued. Ultimately, the Orthodox Patriarch of Jerusalem, Sophronius, agreed to surrender Jerusalem to Caliph Umar in person. Caliph Umar, then at Medina, agreed to these terms and traveled to Jerusalem to sign the capitulation in the spring of 637. Sophronius also negotiated a pact with Caliph Umar, known as the Umariyya Covenant or Covenant of Omar, allowing for religious freedom for Christians in exchange for jizya, a tax to be paid by conquered non-Muslims, called 'Ahl al Dhimmah'. The majority population of Jerusalem during the time of Arab conquest was Christian. In the aftermath the process of Islamization took place, combining immigration to Palestine with the adoption of Arabic as the official language, and conversion of a part of the local Christian population to Islam.

==== Rashidun Caliphate ====
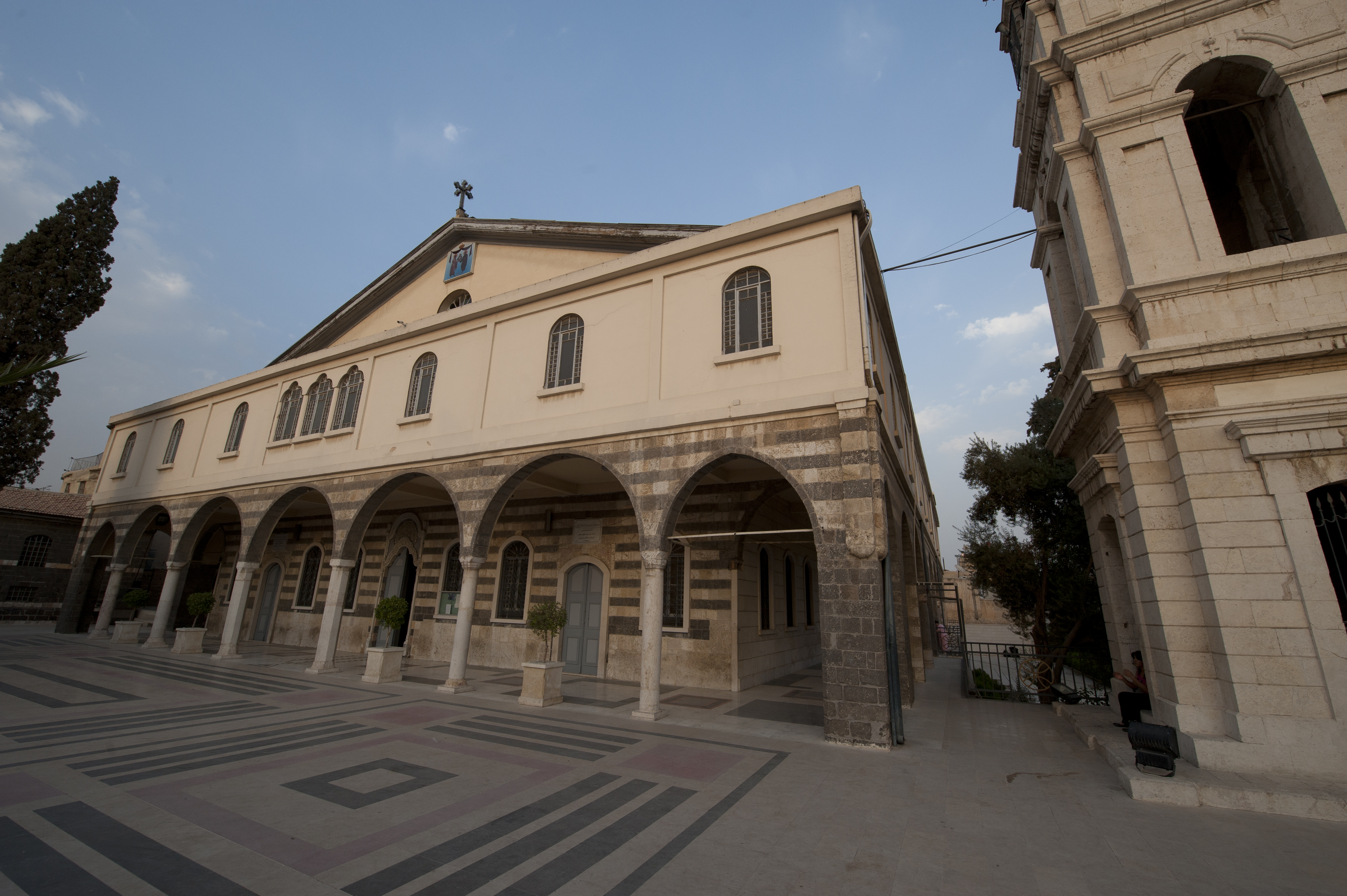
Mariamite Cathedral of Damascus, one of the oldest Greek Orthodox churches in Damascus, Syria and holds the seat of the Greek Orthodox Church of Antioch

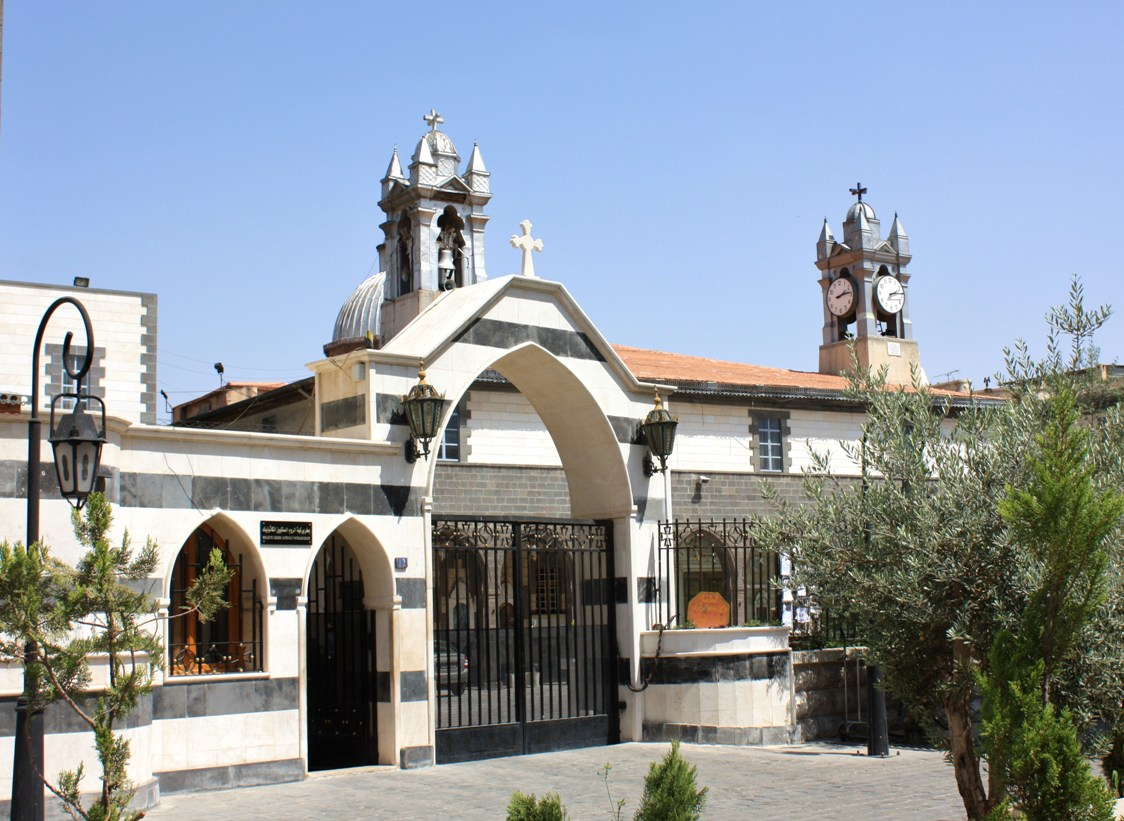
Cathedral of Our Lady of the Dormition, the seat of the Greek-Melkite Archeparchy of Damascus, dependent on the Melkite Catholic Patriarchate of Antioch

According to the historian James William Parkes, during the 1st century after the Arab conquest (640–740), the caliph and governors of Syria and the Holy Land ruled entirely over Christian and Jewish subjects. He further states that apart from the Bedouin in the earliest days, the only Arabs west of the Jordan were the garrisons. The Arab garrisons were kept apart in camps, and life went on much as before for the local population. The taxes instituted were the kharaj—a tax that landowners and peasants paid according to the productivity of their fields—as well as the jizya—paid by non-Muslims in return for protection under the Muslim state and exemption from military service. The Byzantine civil service was retained until a new system could be instituted; therefore, Greek remained the administrative language in the new Muslim territories for over 50 years after the conquests.

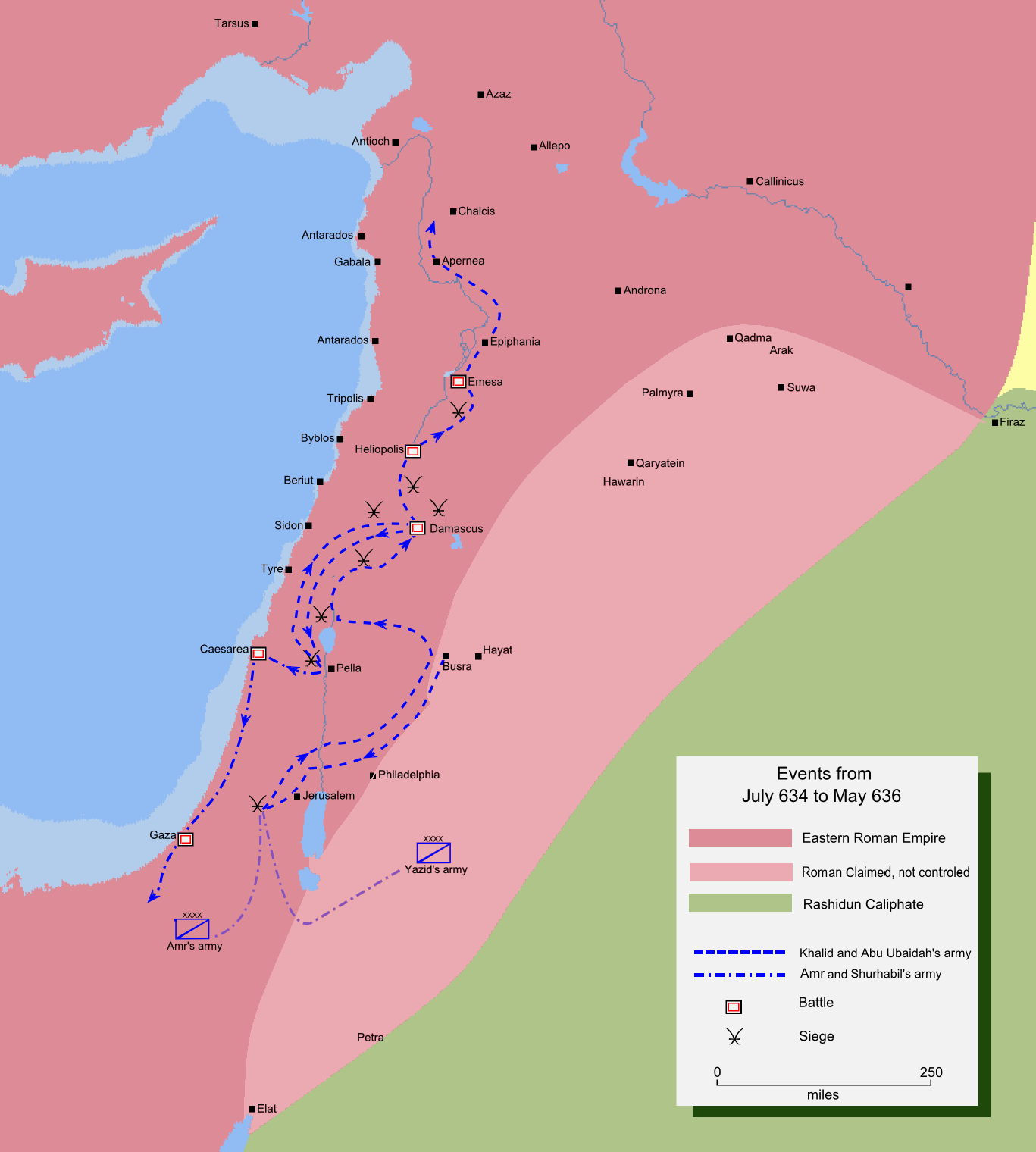
Map detailing the route of Muslim invasion of Southern and Central Syria

==== Umayyad Caliphate ====
The relations between the Muslims and the Christians in the state were good. The Umayyads were involved in frequent battles with the Byzantine Greeks without being concerned with protecting themselves in Syria, which had remained largely Christian like many other parts of the empire. Prominent positions were held by Christians, some of whom belonged to families that had served in Byzantine governments. The employment of Christians was part of a broader policy of religious tolerance that was necessitated by the presence of large Christian populations in the conquered provinces, as in Syria. This policy also boosted Muawiya's popularity and solidified Syria as his power base.

=== Ottoman Period ===
Historically, Antiochians were considered as part of the Rum Millet (millet-i Rûm), or "Roman nation" by the Ottoman authorities. During the early modern period (17th–18th centuries), Arabic gradually replaced Greek as the primary liturgical and administrative language of the Greek Orthodox Church of Antioch. In 1724, a schism occurred within the Patriarchate of Antioch, when a portion of its hierarchy entered communion with the Roman Catholic Church, forming the Melkite Greek Catholic Church, while the remaining majority continued as the Greek Orthodox Church of Antioch. Many Melkite Catholics, under pressure from the Greek-Orthodox, migrated to Lebanese coast, northern Palestine and Egypt, specializing in trade.

==== Greek War of Independence ====
As soon as the Greek revolution commenced, Rûm throughout the Empire were targeted for persecutions, and Syria did not escape Ottoman Turkish wrath. Fearing that the Rûm of Syria might aid the Greek Revolution, the Porte issued an order that they should be disarmed. In Jerusalem, the city's Christian population, who were estimated to make up around 20% of the city's total (with the majority being Rûm), were also forced by the Ottoman authorities to relinquish their weapons, wear black, and help improve the city's fortifications. Greek Orthodox holy sites, such as the Monastery of Our Lady of Balamand, located just south of the city of Tripoli in Lebanon, were subjected to vandalism and revenge attacks, which in fact forced the monks to abandon it until 1830. Not even the Greek Orthodox Patriarch was safe, as orders were received just after the execution of the Ecumenical Patriarchate in Constantinople to kill the Antiochian Patriarch as well; however, local officials failed to execute the orders.

On March 18, 1826, a flotilla of around fifteen Greek ships led by Vasos Mavrovouniotis attempted to spread the Greek Revolution to the Ottoman Levant. According to then-British Consul John Barker, stationed in Aleppo, in a memo to British Ambassador Stratford Canning, in Constantinople. The Greek Revolutionaries landed in Beirut, but were thwarted by a local Mufti and a hastily arranged defense force. Although initially repelled, the Greeks did manage to hold on to a small portion of the city near the seashore in an area inhabited by local Rûm. During which they appealed to the Rûm "to rise up and join them", and even sent an invitation to the chief of the local Druzes to also join the Revolution. A few days later, on March 23, 1826, the regional governor Abdullah Pasha sent his lieutenant and nearly 500 Albanian irregular forces to exact revenge for the failed uprising.

==== Aleppo Massacre of 1850 ====
On October 17–18, 1850 Muslim rioters attacked the Christian neighborhoods of Aleppo. In the aftermath, Ottoman records show that 688 homes, 36 shops, and 6 churches were damaged, including the Greek Catholic patriarchate and its library. The events led hundreds of Christians to migrate mainly to Beirut and Smyrna.

==== Damascus Massacre of 1860 ====
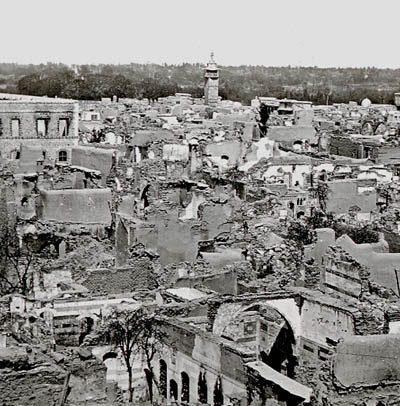
The ruins of the Christian quarter of Damascus in 1860

On July 10, 1860, Saint Joseph of Damascus and 11,000 Antiochian Greek Orthodox and Catholic Christians were killed when Druze and Muslim marauders destroyed part of the old city of Damascus. The Antiochians had taken refuge in the churches and monasteries of Bab Tuma ("Saint Thomas' Gate"). The massacre was a part of the 1860 civil conflict in Mount Lebanon and Damascus, which began as a Maronite rebellion and culminated in the massacre in Damascus.

==== First World War and the Ottoman Greek genocide ====
During the First World War, Antiochians, alongside other Ottoman Greeks, were targeted by the Ittihadist Ottoman authorities in what is now historically known as the Ottoman Greek genocide. As a result, three Antiochian Greek Orthodox Dioceses were completely annihilated; the Metropolis of Tarsus and Adana, the Metropolis of Amida, and the Metropolis of Theodosioupolis. Those Antiochians living outside of the French Mandate for Syria and the Lebanon were subject to the forced population exchange of 1923, which ended the Ottoman Greek genocide. One modern Greek town, which is made up of Antiochian survivors from the population exchange, is Nea Selefkia, which is located in Epirus. The founders of Nea Selefkia were refugees from Silifke in Cilicia.

=== Syro-Lebanese exodus ===
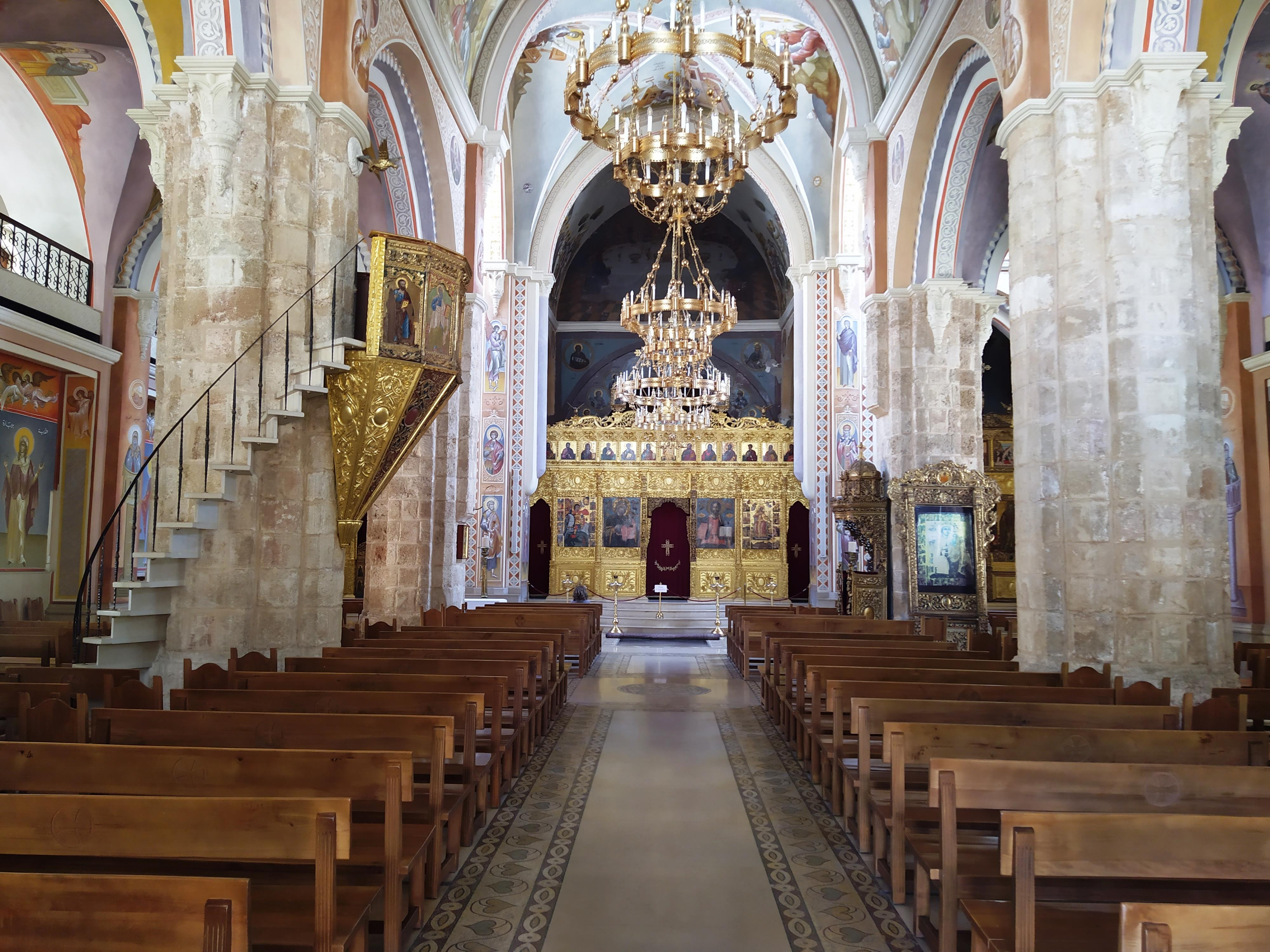
St. George Greek Orthodox Cathedral Beirut, Lebanon

By the dawn of the 20th century, the Syro-Lebanese Christians of Egypt were considered a powerful and cosmopolitan community that played an important role in both Egypt's economy and culture. The community in Egypt counted more than 100,000 members at the turn of the 20th century: civil servants, hairdressers, cobblers, drivers, engineers, dentists, doctors, shopkeepers, painters. Their aggregate wealth was reckoned at one and a half billion francs, 10% of the Egyptian GDP. Those who had capital invested it in small businesses (oil, soaps, tobacco, patisserie). Others created more important companies trading or producing salt, sodium, textiles, perfume, wood, silk. This economic success led to the foundation of schools, clubs, and charities, generally linked to a place of worship which was most of the time a church. A minority returned to their home village but the majority remained "semi-detached", settling for several generations in Egypt without for all that involving themselves fully in the host society.

Due to the rise in nationalism along with the loss of economic freedoms during the 1950s, a part of Egypt's Syro-Lebanese community left the country immigrating to the Americas, Europe, and Australia, as well as many returning to Lebanon (especially Beirut) and Syria. This was known as the 1956–1957 exodus of Egypt's Mutamassirun, which began during the latter stages of the Suez Crisis in Nasserist Egypt.

== Arabization ==
In the 19th and 20th centuries, the Antiochians experienced a resurgence of Arabization, leading most to adopt Arabic as a liturgical language. According to Greek journalist Alexandros Massavetas, the rivalry between Moscow and Constantinople for supremacy over the Orthodox world resulted in a Russian-backed change in leadership of the Antioch Patriarchate from Greeks to Arabs in 1899. Many Antiochians who endorsed pan-Arabism, which was popular in the Levant at the time, adopted and championed Arab nationalism. The bulk of the community supported Arab nationalism, Syrian nationalism, and the Palestinian cause. Moreover, pan-Arabism was competing with other foreign-introduced ideologies in the region, such as Phoenicianism, Arameanism, and Turanism.

== Population ==
The highest concentration of Antiochian Greek Christians still living in the Levant are found within the territories of Syria, Lebanon, and Turkey. Counting the worldwide diaspora, there are more than 2 to 3 million Antiochian Greek Orthodox and Greek Catholic (Melkite) Christians residing in the northern Middle East, the United States, Canada, Australia and Latin America today.

=== Levant ===
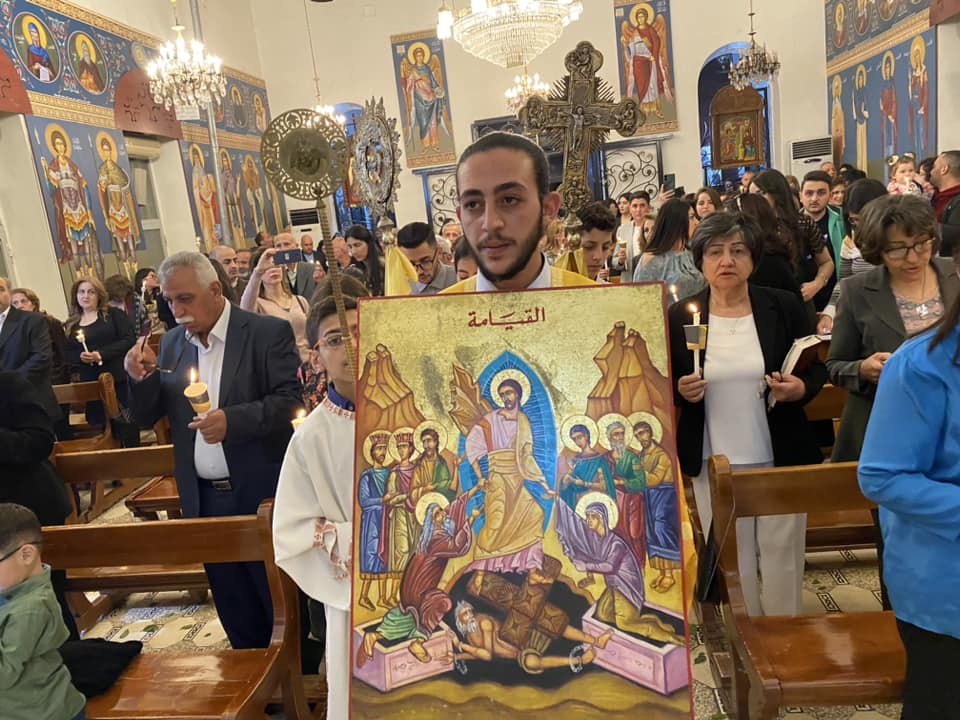
Antiochian Greek Orthodox Easter celebrations in As-Suwayda, Syria

In Syria, the Antiochian Greek Christians are mostly concentrated in Wadi al-Nasara (The Valley of the Christians), as well as the surrounding areas, such as the cities of Mhardeh, Hama, and Homs. Smaller and historical communities can also be found in Aleppo, Damascus, and Latakia. The Greek Orthodox population of Syria is about 1,142,500 people. The Melkite Greek Catholic Church numbers between 118,000 and 240,000 members.

In Lebanon, most Antiochian Greek Christians can be found in the Nabatieh, Matn District, Beqaa Governorate, and North Governorates. Specifically in the Koura District, Zahlé, and Akkar. The Lebanese Greek Orthodox Christians constitute 8% of the total population of Lebanon and the Melkite Catholic Christians are believed to constitute about 5% of the total population of Lebanon.

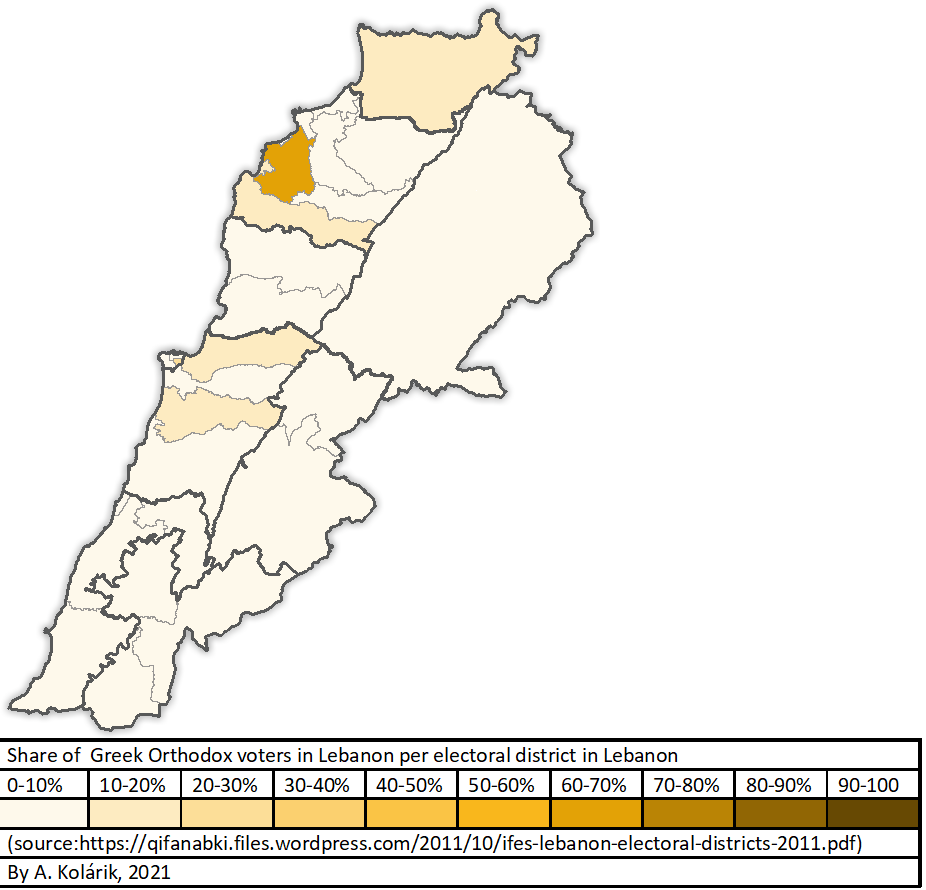
Share of Orthodox population in Lebanon by district. The Lebanese Orthodox may be understood as being part of the Antiochian Greek Christian community. The highest percentage is in Koura District, where they make 72% of the population.

There are approximately 135,000 Christian Arabs in Israel and the Palestinian territories (and more than 39,000 non-Arab Christians). Many of these Christians, along with those living in the West Bank, East Jerusalem, and the Gaza Strip, identify as Palestinian Christians, reflecting a shared heritage in the region. Across Israel and the Palestinian territories, as of 2014, the largest Christian denomination was the Melkite Greek Catholic Church, comprising about 60% of Christians, while the Greek Orthodox Church of Jerusalem accounted for around 30%. In the West Bank, including East Jerusalem and the Gaza Strip, Palestinian Christians number approximately 50,000 and about 1,000 respectively; the majority are Greek Orthodox, with smaller numbers of Roman Catholics, Melkite Greek Catholics, Syrian Orthodox, Armenian Orthodox, and other Christian denominations.

The Jordanian Greek Orthodox Christians are believed to number 120,000, most of whom are Arabic speaking, or by some accounts more than 300,000. There are currently 29 Greek Orthodox churches – with that number on the increase – which come under the Jerusalem Patriarchate. The Melkites count 27,000 in Jordan.

According to an ethnographic study published by Alexander Synvet in 1878, there were 125,000 Greek Orthodox Christians living in Syria, Lebanon, and Palestine, as well as another 35,000 Greek Catholics.

After the Syrian province of Alexandretta was given to Turkey by the French Mandate powers in 1939, many migrated to Syria and Lebanon. Whilst those able to remain in Turkey are concentrated in the Hatay Province, a significant number of Antiochian Greek Christians have migrated to Istanbul. They now live in Antakya, Mersin, İskenderun, the villages of Altınözü and Tokaçlı, a string of villages in Samandağ, and the seaside town of Arsuz. A case of intercommunal violence with Turkish Muslims in Altınözü was reported in 2005. The events were allegedly sparked by sexual harassment of a Christian girl by a Muslim barber's apprentice.

=== Americas ===
One of the Largest communities of Greek Catholic Melkites live in South America, In 2010, the Eparchy of Nossa Senhora do Paraiso em São Paulo in Brazil had 443,000 members; the Apostolic Exarchate of Argentina has 310,700 members; Venezuela has 26,600 people members and Mexico 4,700.

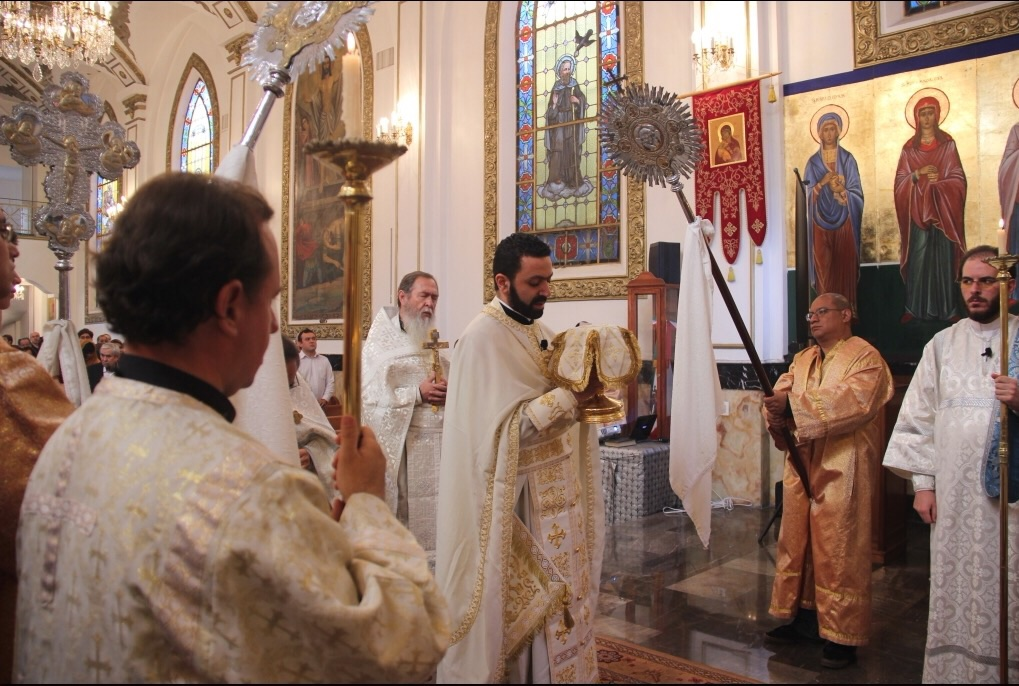
Service at the Catedral Ortodoxa de San Jorge in Colonia Roma, Mexico City. Part of the Greek Orthodox Church of Antioch, it is under the auspices of Archbishop Antonio Chedraoui.

In North America Catholic Melkites total 60,000, and the membership of the Greek Orthodox is about 500,000 people.

The homeland of the Greek Orthodox is mostly Syria where it has the highest population of Christians and Lebanon. But like the Catholic Melkites, the largest population live in the Americas. The Antiochian Greek Orthodox population of Latin America is about 2.5 million people, while the Antiochian Greek Orthodox population of North America is about 450,000 and in South America is about 130,000 just in Brazil, mostly in São Paulo.

=== Oceania ===
The Catholic Melkite community exist in Australia, with 53,700 members. In Australia and New Zealand, the Greek Orthodox Melkites number about 43,500, or according to the Prime Minister's estimate in 2007 – 123,000 members.

=== Europe ===
In Europe, there are about 40,000 Antiochan Greek Christians.

== Genetics ==
The designation "Greek" refers to the historic use of Koine Greek in liturgy, not to ethnicity; most Antiochian Greek Christians identify themselves as Arabs. During the First Crusade era, most of them were referred to as Syriacs ethnically and Greeks only in regard to religious affinity: only the inhabitants of Antioch city were thought to be Greek ethnically. However, some sources label them with a Greek identity. According to Greek historian Pavlos Karolidis writing in 1908, they are a mixture of ancient Greek settlers and particularly Macedonians, Roman-era Greeks, and Byzantine Greeks ("Rûm"), as well as indigenous Levantines. Karolidis was attempting to refute the Russian claims that they were of Aramean origin. They were included as Greeks in an ethnographic study published by French historian and ethnographer Alexander Synvet in 1878.

=== Lebanon ===
A genetic study in 2011 done by Marc Haber and his team done on the Maronites of Lebanon revealed no noticeable or significant genetic differentiation when looking at common and frequent paternal haplogroups between the Greek Orthodox Christians, Maronites, Greek Catholic Christians, Sunni Muslims, Shiite Muslims, and Druze of the region. But Ruffié and Taleb (1965) found significant differences of blood markers between ethno-religious groups, particularly the Greek Orthodox in Lebanon, based on a substantially larger sample of Greek Orthodox and Greek Catholic individuals within a broader research project—but their research ignored other related 'Melkite-Antiochian' Greek Orthodox and Greek Catholic communities in Syria, Southeastern Turkey and Northern Israel. A study by Makhoul et al. (2010) on Beta Thalassemia Heterogeneity in Lebanon found out that the thalassemia mutations in Lebanese Christians are similar to the ones observed in Macedonia, Greece which "may confirm the presumed ancient Macedonian origin of certain Lebanese Christians". In July 2024, an archaeogenetic study published in Scientific Reports (Platt et al.) set out to determine the genetic profile of the Greek Orthodox of Lebanon. They sampled the Greek Orthodox population of the Koura District in Lebanon to do this. When they projected Koura samples in PCA plots, they consistently fell in a cluster that mainly contained ancient Anatolians, ancient Syrians and showed affinities to ancient, but not modern Greece. They concluded that the Greek Orthodox in the Koura District requires an additional Anatolian genetic stream rather than just pure regional continuity.

== Notable people ==
- Shireen Abu Akleh - Palestinian journalist
- Michel Aflaq - Syrian philosopher and sociologist
- Nancy Ajram - Lebanese singer, television personality and businesswoman
- Rene Angelil - Canadian impresario of Syrian-Lebanese descents
- George Antonius - Lebanese author and diplomat
- Marcos Baghdatis - Lebanese-Cypriot tennis player
- Melhem Barakat - Lebanese singer, songwriter, and composer
- Nayib Bukele - Salvadoran president of maternal Antiochian descent
- Hilarion Capucci - Syrian Catholic bishop
- Majida El Roumi - Lebanese soprano
- Wael Kfoury - Lebanese singer, musician, songwriter, and actor
- Nicolas Hayek - Lebanese-Swiss businessman
- Salma Hayek - Mexican-American actress of paternal Antiochian descent
- Abdallah Marrash - Syrian writer
- Francis Marrash - Syrian scholar, publicist, writer and poet
- Maryana Marrash - Syrian writer and poet
- Zuhair Murad - Lebanese fashion designer
- Antoun Saadeh - Lebanese politician, sociologist, philosopher and writer
- George Sabra - Syrian politician
- Nassim Nicholas Taleb – Lebanese-American essayist, scholar, statistician, former trader and risk analyst
- Emil Wakim - Lebanese-American Comedian
- Bishara Wakim - Lebanese-Egyptian Director and Playwright
- Jurji Zaydan - Lebanese novelist, journalist, editor and teacher
- Nassif Zeytoun - Syrian singer
- Constantin Zureiq - Syrian intellectual

== Historical people ==
- Saint Paul
- Saint Peter
- Saint Luke, 1st century AD, Christian evangelist and author of the Gospel of St. Luke and Acts of the Apostles
- Saint Domnius, Bishop of Salona and patron saint of Split
- George of Antioch
- Ignatius of Antioch, Patriarch of Antioch
- John Chrysostom (349–407) Patriarch of Constantinople
- Paul of Samosata

== See also ==
- Jewish Christians
- List of Greek Orthodox Antiochian Churches in Europe
  - Greek Orthodox Church of Jerusalem
- Melkite
- Lebanese Christians
  - Lebanese Greek Orthodox Christians
  - Lebanese Melkite Christians
