= Seattle Erotic Art Festival =

Art festival in Seattle, Washington, US

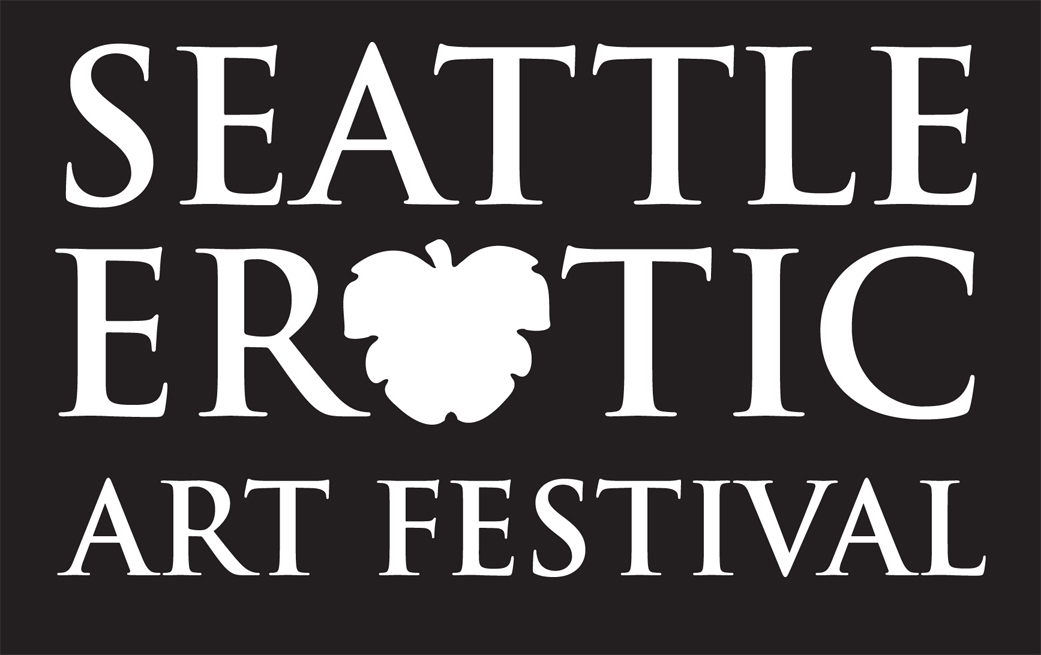
- Status: Active
- Genre: Festival
- Frequency: Annually
- Locations: 301 Mercer Street, Seattle, WA 98109
- Coordinates: 47°37′26.66″N 122°21′5.57″W
- Country: US
- Inaugurated: 2003
- Previous event: April 26–28, 2024
- Website: www.seaf.art

The Seattle Erotic Art Festival was founded in 2002 and is the flagship program of the nonprofit Pan Eros Foundation.

The Festival supports all communities, promotes freedom of expression, and fosters sex-positive culture through public celebration of the arts.

It is an annual weekend-long event, and showcases erotic art in diverse media including painting, photography, sculpture, film, literature, and interactive installations. A wide range of performance art is also represented, including burlesque, ballroom dance, circus arts, and live music.

== History ==
The first Seattle Erotic Art Festival was held in 2003. The inaugural show was hosted by the Pan Eros Foundation (formerly the Foundation for Sex Positive Culture) at the town hall in the Capitol Hill neighborhood and saw over 1000 attendees.

The Festival was hosted at a variety for locations over its first few years, including Fremont Studios before finding a more permanent location at the Seattle Center Exhibition hall, where it's been held since 2008.

== Content ==
Past festivals have included original theatrical productions, interactive art installations and visual erotic art.

Each year, festival visitors and a selected jury vote for Viewer's Choice and Jury Awards, respectively.

== Controversies ==
In 2007, Festival organizers were turned down by "a dozen" regional publishers who refused to print their program before finding a local printer who would take the job.
