= Wasteland (event) =

Fetish event

Wasteland, or 'The Wasteland Party' is a fetish event held in Amsterdam, Netherlands and Berlin, Germany

Wasteland is one of the biggest and longest running fetish events in the world, having begun in 1994. Wasteland has about 6,000–8,000 visitors, over 40 acts and more than five stages every year. Besides fetish performances, there are DJs, Life music, (Inter)national performers, Visuals, cinema and fashion shows by couturiers. The event is currently held in the Northseavenue.

Wasteland held its first edition outside of the Netherlands in 2011. The KitKatClub in Berlin was the venue for this event. Wasteland Berlin is now held once a year in October at the Kitkatclub.

Since 2017, Wasteland also has a summer edition, called Wasteland Summerfest, held in July. They started out at creative hotspot Thuishaven.

== History ==
Wasteland began in 1994 in Amsterdam. Its main goal was to bring fetishism out of the underground and expose it to a wider audience. Open-mindedness and tolerance are still key elements during this event. Outrageous partying gay, straight and bi-sexual fetishists caused a commotion in the city of Amsterdam. It was something that had been seen never before. A gangway was built between Club Richter and Cafe Blitz in the Reguliersdwarsstraat for the event. The beautifully dressed guests could be admired by passersby from the street. Pictures of this were shared all over the world.
