= KitKatClub =

Berlin nightclub

- KitKat
- KitKatClub Berlin
- Interactive map of KitKatClub
- Location: Mitte, Berlin, Germany
- Coordinates: 52°30′40″N 13°25′00″E
- Owner: Simon Thaur and Kirsten Krüger
- Type: Nightclub

Construction
- Opened: March 1994

The KitKatClub is a nightclub in Berlin, opened in March 1994 by Austrian pornographic filmmaker Simon Thaur and his life partner Kirsten Krüger. It is a nightclub known for its diverse crowd, open sexual expression, strict fetish dress code, and emphasis on music and dancing.

Since its founding in 1994, Berlin's KitKatClub has moved locations multiple times, evolved from trance roots to a broad electronic music scene, launched a record label, adapted through the COVID-19 pandemic, and celebrated its 30th anniversary in 2024. It has inspired a new generation of open-minded, sex-positive parties worldwide, influencing venues like Budapest’s Ministry of Freedom, which models its dress code and sexual freedom ethos on it.

== Nightclub ==
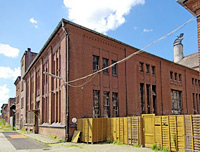
Bessemerstraße, a previous location of the club

The KitKatClub is known for its sexually uninhibited parties. Guests are allowed to engage in sexual intercourse openly at the venue. The motto of the club is "do what you want but stay in communication". Patrons are diverse, including heterosexuals and members of the LGBT+ community.

A strict dress code is applied for entry at the door, often enforced by Kirsten Krüger herself during the "Carneball Bizarre Club Night" events, held on Saturdays, and requiring fetish, latex, leather, kinky, high style, and glamour. The venue consists of three dance floors and an outdoor area with a pool. It is decorated with ultra-violet light and fluorescent colour paintings by the Berlin-based painter Vigor Calma a.k.a. "Der Träumer" (the dreamer).

Nowadays, the emphasis in the club is more on music and dancing than on sexual activities.

== History ==
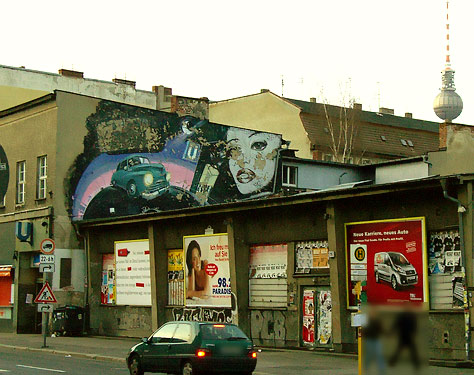
The club as it appeared in 2007 (at Brückenstraße)

The club has moved three times since its opening in 1994. It opened in Glogauer Straße in the Kreuzberg district in the former Turbine. In 1999 it moved to Neues Schauspielhaus at Nollendorfplatz, and in 2001 to another lot in the district Tempelhof (which became part of Schöneberg in 2000) in Bessemer Straße. At the beginning of July 2007, it moved to the SageClub in the Mitte district at Brückenstraße 1.

When the KitKat opened its doors in 1994 the musical profile of the club was mainly classical trance mixed with Goa trance, but through the years the club has opened up to a wider selection of electronic music. A KitKat record label was founded in 2005 and two CDs were released, Hedonistic Nightlife in Berlin and The Piep Show Compilation #0.

The KitKatClub Berlin celebrated its 20th anniversary on March 1, 2014. At that time a novel about the early years of KitKat was published under the same name KitKatClub, written by Vigor Calma. In 2019, a new edition of the novel appeared under the title Rausch in Berlin (German language only).

After the closing and the loss of any income due to the COVID-19 pandemic, the KitKatClub set up a website to support the club and transmit streams live from the location. The club started offering COVID-19 tests in December 2020.

On March 2, 2024, the KitKatClub celebrated its 30th anniversary at the "Disco Bizarre" event.

== In film ==
KitKatClub – Kinks of Berlin (2026) is a German-Austrian documentary directed by Philipp Fussenegger that follows several regular guests of the club, as well as co-founder Simon Thaur and his partner Mali, both in everyday life and during club nights. According to the Berliner Morgenpost, the project began during the COVID-19 pandemic, when Kirsten Krüger suggested a film about the club's time as a testing centre; it later became a film about the club after its reopening. Produced by Avanti Media Fiction with FUNFAIRFILMs and ZDF's Das kleine Fernsehspiel, it was shot in Berlin between 2022 and 2025 entirely in black and white, with the faces of incidentally filmed guests blurred to protect their identities.

The film premiered at the 28th Thessaloniki Documentary Festival in March 2026 and was subsequently screened at CPH:DOX in Copenhagen. It won the Best Documentary award at the Porn Film Festival Vienna 2026 and was released in German cinemas on 10 September 2026. It was one of two documentaries about the club released in 2026.

== Name origin ==
The name KitKatClub is inspired by the frivolous Berliner nightclub featured in the American musical Cabaret. Harold Prince's Cabaret was set in Berlin in the early 1930s, against the backdrop of the ascent of the Nazi party, at a burlesque theatre called the "Kit Kat Club". The name originated from the Kit-Cat Club, an 18th-century English liberal political society.

== Followers ==
The KitKatClub has served as an example in many countries for open-minded parties of new generations, where a sex-positive attitude merges with electronic music. The Ministry of Freedom club in Budapest also traces its image back to the KitKatClub, considering it the most important role model in terms of dress code and the experience of sexual freedom.

== See also ==
- List of electronic dance music venues
- Sex positive
