= Arabesque (classical music) =

Music melodies for Arabic architecture

An arabesque is a type of music which uses melodies to create the atmosphere of Arabic architecture. The term and themes are borrowed from the art term arabesque, rather than stemming from Arabic music. It is a highly ornamented style.

The name has origins in the middle of the seventeenth century, it is derived from the Italian word "arabesco," which is translated to "in Arabic style," from the noun "arabo." The French translation became "arabesque," and this term peaked in popularity in the middle of the nineteenth century.

Western interpretations of the Arabic style was characterised by Islamic art, and then implemented in the musical sphere. The art form entails rhythmic linear and intricate geometric patterns to decorate motifs which consists of foliage, fruits or tree leaves. These patterns were found within Islamic architecture, in mosques and palaces. These lines found within nature and Islamic art are mirrored within the melodies of arabesque music, described as "highly ornamental."

The arabesque emerged in the West as a part of the Classical period in music, defined by the return to classical forms of art from Greece and Rome, and in this case, Arab classical culture. It drew on the simplicity of the art and architecture to "avoid extravagant excess" in the music. Despite returns to classical simplicity, the arabesque is a decorative piece with ornamentation.

It uses three compositional devices. These are the decoration of a theme using counterpoint, the use of "grupetti" (turns) to decorate themes, and harmonies that rapidly change without rushing the piece forward. These devices create the effect of "frozen music."

Lots of famous composers who composed pieces in the arabesque style, like Claude Debussy, were influenced by visual arts and culture. Debussy composed his arabesques with French salon culture in mind. The French salon was interested in the "other," including elements of Arabic culture; the arabesque performed in the salon was a product of this interest. Debussy's circle was heavily influenced by the arabesque in literature and visual arts. The peak of popularity for composing arabesques in the late 1800s demonstrates this. The arabesque, however, was not seen at the time as the most sincere form of musical expression; German poet Friedrich von Schlegel referred to the arabesque as "not a work of high rank."

== Notable arabesques ==
The opening bars of Jean Sibelius's Arabesque (Op.76, No.9).

The most well-known are Claude Debussy's Deux Arabesques, composed in 1888 and 1891, respectively.

Other composers who have written arabesques include:

- Claude Debussy: Two Arabesques (1891), L.66
- Marin Marais: L'arabesque (1717), appears in the soundtrack of the film Tous les Matins du Monde
- Robert Schumann: Arabeske in C, Op. 18 (1839)
- Johann Friedrich Franz Burgmüller (1806–1874): Op. 100 (1852)
- Hans von Bülow: Arabesques sur un thême de l’opéra Rigoletto (1853)
- Moritz Moszkowski: Opp. 15/2 (1877), 61 (1899), 95/4 and 96/5 (1920)
- Enrique Granados: Arabesca, Op. 31, H. 142 (1890)
- Cécile Chaminade: Opp. 61 (1892) and 92 (1898)
- Anton Arensky: Op. 67 (1903)
- Adolf Schulz-Evler: Op. 12 Arabesques on "An der schönen blauen Donau" (1904)
- Edward MacDowell (1889–1890) 12 Etudes, Op. 39, Arabesque no'4.
- Louis Vierne: Arabesque, Op. 31/15 (1913–4)
- Jean Sibelius: Arabesque, Op. 76/9 (1914)
- Leo Ornstein: 9 Arabesques, Op. 42 (1921)
- Bohuslav Martinů: Seven Arabesques for cello and piano (1931)
- Edward Joseph Collins: Arabesque for violin and piano (1933)
- William Kroll: Arabesque for violin and piano (1945) and for orchestra
- Harold Budd: Arabesque 1, 2 & 3 (2005)
- Samuel Hazo: Arabesque (2008)
- Sigfrid Karg-Elert: Arabeske no.1 in G flat major Op.5 'Filigran'
- Nikolai Medtner: 3 Arabesques, Op. 7 (1901–04)

== See also ==
- Arabesque (Turkish music)
