= Jean Charles Carbone =

French composer

- Born: 10 April 1979 (age 46); Marseille, France
- Occupations: Record producer and composer

Jean Charles Carbone (born 10 April 1979, Marseille, France) is a French-Italian record producer, arranger and composer. Since 1998, he has been working as freelance sound engineer, both in Italy and abroad, and as in-house producer at Teatro delle Voci and Abnegat Records. As a producer and sound engineer, he shares credits with artists including Ronan Chris Murphy, Steve Vai, Richard Ray Farrell, Black Crowes' Chris Robinson, Alan Vega, Jarvis Cocker, Gavin Friday, Caterina Caselli, Marco Pandolfi, Swamp Dogg, Mick Collins, Mark Arm, Stan Ridgway, Jennifer Gentle's Marco Fasolo, Verdena and many others, producing records for Italian television and several international releases.

== Awards ==
In 2002, Carbone received a platinum music recording sales certification for composing, arranging and producing the song "Never Too Late", released by Sugar/Universal, also used in an Italian commercial by TIM.

In 2013, the band C+C=Maxigross received from the Italian Meeting of Independent Record Labels the award for "the best Italian independent production of 2013" for the album Ruvain, for which Carbone engineered three tracks.

In 2015, he was nominated for an Australian Music Celtic Award for the album Nitro, by the band SIDH.

== Other contributions ==
In 2004, the song "If" was used by MTV as the theme song for "MTV en Cuba".

In 2009, he co-produced and co-wrote the song "La lune" released by Scorpio/BMG, which became number 43 in the French chart.

In 2012, he produced Marco Pandolfi's record Close the Bottle When You're Done.

In 2015, he produced the first album conceived for teaching music and lyrics in Italian schools for RCS, published with the schoolbook Sentieri Sonori, republished by Mondadori.

From 2016 to 2019, he produced tracks for other Italian schoolbooks published by Loescher-Bonacci Editore and Palumbo Editore.

== Discography ==
Wr=Composition | Arr=Arranging | Eng=Engineering | Mx=Mixing | Mst=Mastering | Rmst=Remastering | Prod=Production | Perf=Performing (*some credits are shared)

Year	Artist	Title	Label	Credits
2019	Fabio Caon	Sentieri Sonori	Mondadori	Arr-Mx-Mst
2019	Marcus Grimm	2 Planets	La Valigetta	Perf-Prod-Arr-Mx-Mst
2019	Jennifer Gentle	Jennifer Gentle	La Tempesta	Mx-Mst
2019	Carlomaria	Things I Need to Know	EP - Artist First	Perf-Prod-Arr-Mx-Mst
2018	Fabio Caon	Metti un Giorno Che	Navi per Mari	Prod-Arr-Mx-Mst
2015	Les Manouches Bohémiens	Jean	Abnegat Records	Eng
2015	Fabio Caon	Italian	Bonacci Editore	Perf-Prod-Arr-Mx-Mst
2015	Donne Si Fa Storia	Donne Si Fa Storia	Abnegat Records	Prod-Eng-Mx-Mst
2015	Pierpaola Porqueddu	Pierpaola Porqueddu	Abnegat Records	Prod-Eng-Mx-Mst
2015	La Belle Epoque	Il Mare di Dirac	Abnegat Records	Prod-Eng-Mx-Mst
2015	Sentieri Sonori	Sentieri Sonori	RCS Education	Arr-Prod-Eng-Mx-Mst
2014	The SIDH	Nitro	Cramps Music	Arr-Prod-Eng-Mx-Mst
2014	100 Giorni da Pecora	100 Giorni da Pecora	Abnegat Records	Wr-Arr-Prod-Eng-Mx-Mst
2014	Boxerin Club	Aloha Krakatoa	Bomba Dischi	Eng-Mst
2013	Marco Pandolfi	No Dog In This Hunt		Prod-Eng-Mx-Mst
2013	Steve Vai	Live Recording in Trieste, Ravenna and Bucharest		Eng
2013	Universal Daughters	why hast thou forsaken me?	Abnegat Records/Audioglobe-Rough Trade	Prod-Eng-Mx-Mst
2013	LUME	LUME	Orchard	Eng-Mx-Mst
2013	Canzoniere del Lazio	Miradas	Cramps/Sony	Eng-Rmst
2013	Giancarlo Corradini	...A Cardini	Cramps/Sony	Eng-Rmst
2013	100 Giorni da Pecora	Le Convenzioni sono Affamate	Abnegat Records	Wr-Prod-Eng-Arr-Mx-Mst
2012	Arianna Antinori	Arianna Antinori	Abnegat Records/K1 Edizioni	Wr-Arr-Eng-M-Prod
2012	Marco Pandolfi	Close The Bottle When You're Done	Abnegat Records	Prod-M-Eng
2012	Gianluca De Rubertis	Autoritratti con oggetti	Niegazowana	Prod-Eng
2012	C+C=Maxigross	Ruvain (Single+2 tracks)	Vaggimal Records/Audioglobe	M-Eng
2012	DJ Nanna	Strani Amori	T-Rex	Prod-Arr-Eng-Mx-Mst
2012	DJ Nanna	Una Storia Importante	T-Rex	Prod-Arr-Eng-Mx-Mst
2012	DJ Nanna	La Canzone di Marinella	T-Rex	Prod-Arr-Eng-Mx-Mst
2012	DJ Nanna	Le Melodie di Natale	T-Rex	Prod-Arr-Eng-Mx-Mst
2012	DJ Nanna	Meravigliosa Creatura	T-Rex	Prod-Arr-Eng-Mx-Mst
2012	Francesco Trento	frAzioni di Viaggio	Abnegat Records	Wr-Prod-Eng-Arr-Mx-Mst
2012	100 Giorni da Pecora	*Anteprima	Abnegat Records	Wr-Prod-Eng-Arr-Mx-Mst
2012	Gioaccardo	Charles	Niegazowana/Picane	M-Eng
2011	Vanillina	Conta fino a Dieci	Venus	M-Eng
2011	Riaffiora	La Marsigliese	Dischi Soviet Studio	M-Eng
2011	OOPART	Perfidia		M-Eng
2011	Emmanuele Lo Russo	Note sull'onda di una vita	Abnegat Records	Prod-M-Eng
2011	Katia Ricciarelli	Addio del Passato	Cramps	Eng-Rmst
2011	100 Giorni da Pecora	Progetto 5	Abnegat Records	C-Prod-Eng-Arr-Mx-Mst
2011	Nicotine Alley	Downstaris	Marvel Hill Records	Eng-Mx
2011	Lola & The Lovers	Pissed off	Event Sound Promotion	Mst
2011	Fondazione Marzotto	Estate 2011	Marzotto Records	Prod-Eng-Mx-Mst
2011	L'Anthologia	new wave, punk e post punk	Cramps	Eng-Rmst
2010	L'Anthologia	Funk	Veneto West	Eng-Rmst
2010	Mr. Kinder	B612	Abnegat Records	P-M-Eng
2010	Donella Del Monaco	Opus Avantra	Cramps	Prod-Eng-Mx-Mst
2010	Il Genio	Vivere Negli Anni X	Disastro Records/Universal	Prod-M-Eng
2010	Opus Avantra	Introspezione	Cramps	Eng-Rmst
2010	Diving Suit	Foetus	Abnegat Records	Prod-Eng-Mx-Mst
2010	Paola e Luigi	Una Donna, Una Storia, Una Fiaba	Abnegat Records	Prod-Mx-Eng-Mst
2009	Il Mondo di Lucy	Il Mondo di Lucy	Abnegat Records	Prod-Eng
2009	Bestie del Quartiere	Varna	Abnegat Records	Prod-Eng-Mx-Mst
2009	Freakout	Viaggio Spaziale	InMusica Records	Eng-Mst
2008	Il Genio	Il Genio	Disastro Records/Universal	M-Eng
2008	Il Genio	Il Telefono	Diaframma	Prod-Mx-Eng-Mst
2008	Max Lazzarin	Don't Touch My shoes	Abnegat Records	Wr-Eng-M-Prod
2008	Lunie	La Lune	Scorpio	Prod-Eng-Wr
2007	Richard Ray Farrell & Marco Pandolfi	Stuck on the Blues	Blue Beet	Prod-M-Eng
2007	Tony Costa	Streetlife II	Abnegat Records/Inmusica	Prod-Eng-Mx-Mst
2007	Richard Ray Farrell & The Jacknives	Electric Blues	Abnegat Records	Prod-M-Eng
2006	D'Vious C	3D (single)	Sugar/Universal	Wr-Arr-Eng-M-Prod
2005	D'Vious C	Contraddiction	Sugar/Universal	Wr-Arr-Eng-M-Prod
2005	D'Vious C	IF (single)	Sugar/Universal	Wr-Arr-Eng-M-Prod
2005	Geronimo Stilton	Nel Regno della Fantasia	Piemme/Mondadori	Prod-Arr-Mx-Eng-Mst
2004	D'Vious C	Be Like Me (Single)	Sugar	Wr-Arr-Eng-M-Prod
2003	Amici	Yeppiyayea	Universal	Prod-M-Eng-Arr
2003	Jean Charles Carbone	Geronimo Stilton	Nel Regno della Fantasia	Prod-Mx-Arr-Mst
2002	Saranno Famosi	Never too Late	Sugar/Universal	Prod-M-Eng-Arr-Wr
2002	D'Vious C	Compilation RnB 2000 Hit	Le Parc Music	Wr-Arr-Eng-M-Prod
1996	Francesca De Muri	Videofestival Live 96	RAI3	Wr-Arr-Eng-M-Prod
1995	D'Vious C	Jam Crew and Friends	Power Records	Prod-Arr

== Films ==
Year	Artist	Title	Movie	Credits
2012	D'Vious C	Me & You	Acciaio	Prod-Mx-Eng-Arr-Wr-Mst
2012	Jean Charles Carbone	Full Soundtrack	Study	Prod-Mx-Eng-Arr-Wr-Mst
2010	Jean Charles Carbone	Soundtrack	Il mio primo schiaffo (best short movie YouTube worldwide contest)	Prod-Mx-Eng-Arr-Wr-Mst
2006	D'Vious C	various tracks	Cardiofitness	Prod-Mx-Eng-Arr-Wr-Mst

== Other sources ==
- "The Engineers Team". Abnegat Records. Archived from the original on 2016-04-13.
- Sebastiano Messina (2002-05-21). "Saranno famosi ma non sono originali - la Repubblica.it". Ricerca.repubblica.it (in Italian).
- "Universal Daughters - Recensione - Why hast Thou forsaken me? (Psichedelico, Alternativo, Pop rock)". Rockit.it.
- "PIMI e PIVI 2013, ecco le nomination! La rosa dei migliori progetti fra cui saranno eletti i vincitori di quest'anno | MeiWeb". Meiweb.it. 2013-10-28.
- "Universal Daughters: Why hast Thou forsaken me? - Osservatori Esterni". Osservatoriesterni.it. Archived from the original on 2016-08-14.
- "Official Site - Irish Singer and Composer". Gavin Friday.
- "Rizzoli Education | Home". Auladigitale.rcseducation.it. Archived from the original on 2015-03-16.
