= Il Genio =

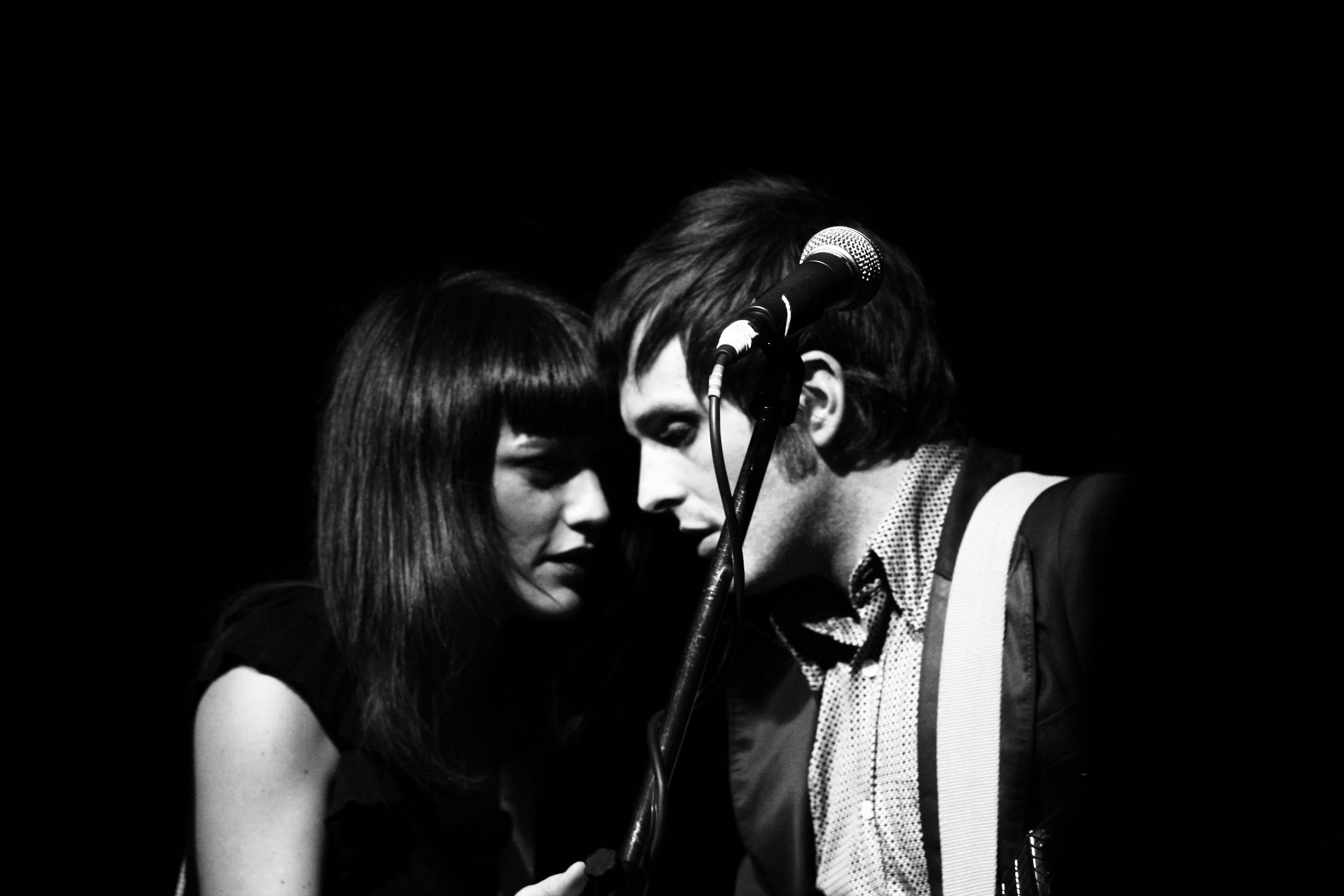

Background information
- Origin: Lecce, Apulia, Italy
- Genres: Pop, electronica
- Years active: 2007 - Present
- Labels: Disastro, Cramps Music, Universal
- Members: Gianluca De Rubertis; Alessandra Contini

Il Genio are an Italian electropop duo, consisting of Gianluca De Rubertis (guitar, keyboards, drums) and Alessandra Contini (bass vocals). Originally from Lecce, they moved to Milan in the early 2000s. In 2008 they were signed by Disastro Record (a label affiliated to Universal) and released their first album. Il Genio are best known for their hit Pop Porno, who spent seven weeks in the Italian top 20.

They sing in both Italian and French.

== Discography ==
=== Albums ===
- Il Genio (2008)
- Vivere Negli Anni X (2010)
- Una voce poco fa (2013)

=== Singles ===
- Pop Porno (2008)
- Non è Possibile (2009)
- Cosa Dubiti (2010)
- Precipitevolissimevolmente (duet with Dente) (2010)
- Tahiti Tahiti (2010)
- Roberta (2010)
- Amore chiama Terra (2011)
- Amore di massa (2013)
- Bar cinesi (2013)
- Dopo Mezzanotte (2014)

== Concerts ==
In June 2017 they held a concert in Florence.
