= Center for Sex Positive Culture =

Non-profit

Coordinates: 47.633738°N 122.375803°W

- Formation: 1999
- Type: Non-profit
- Purpose: Sex positivism
- Headquarters: Seattle, Washington
- Region served: United States
- Website: thecspc.org

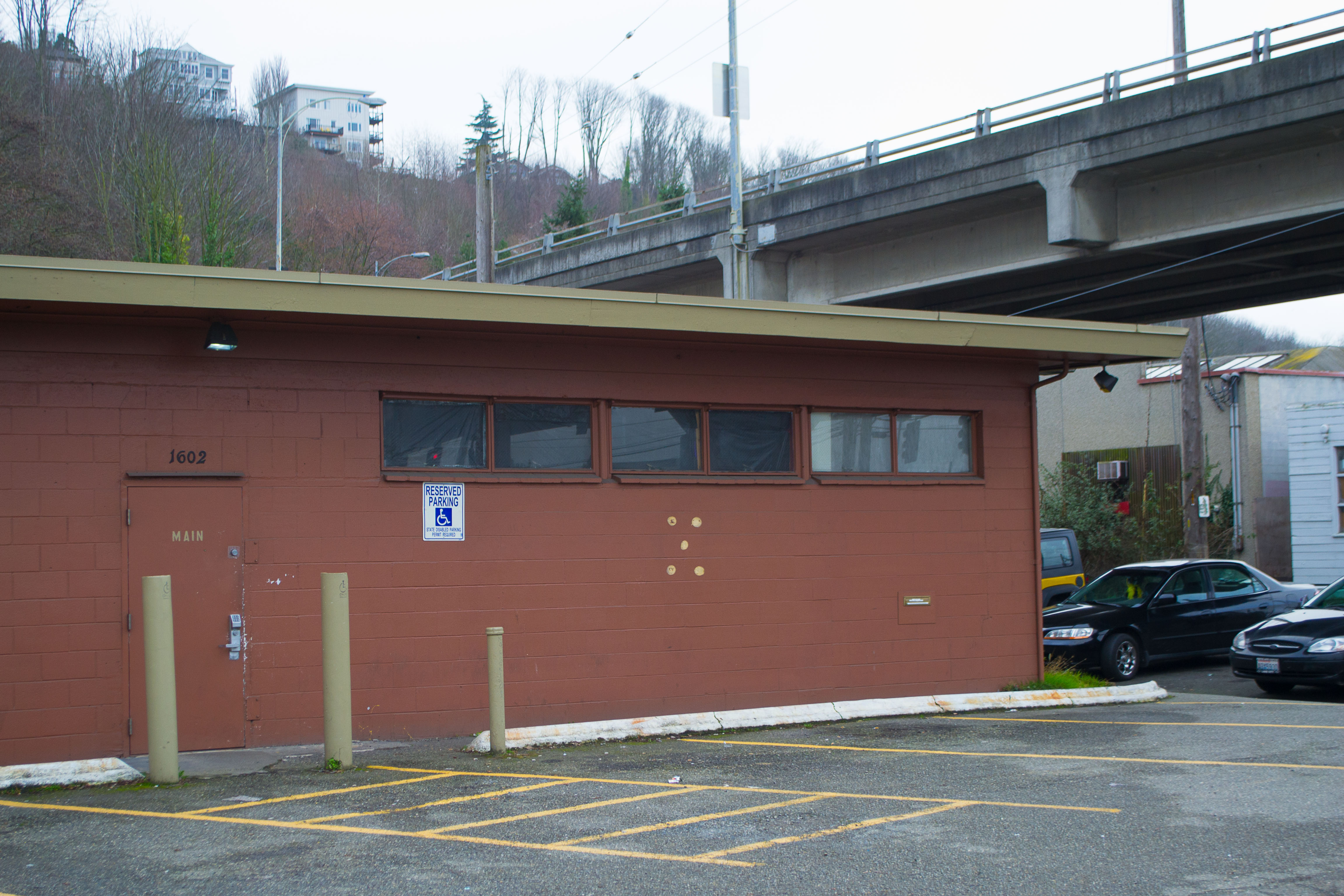
Seattle's Center for Sex Positive Culture main building was demolished in 2017 and relocated to Gallery Erato at 309 1st Ave S

The Center for Sex Positive Culture (CSPC), formerly known as The Wet Spot, is a non-profit, membership-based organization located in Seattle, Washington. It organizes events and provides space for several sex-positive subcultures, notably BDSM, swinging, and polyamory groups. CSPC welcomes people of all sexual identities and seeks to encompass all consensual sexual practices. The Center is a 501(c)(7) recreational club; its sister organization, the Foundation for Sex Positive Culture (renamed Pan-Eros in 2018) is a 501(c)(3) charitable/educational organization.

The organization held its first event, a fundraiser, in March 1999.

== History ==
The organization was founded in 1999 as the Seattle Sex Positive Community Center. Socially speaking, it is an outgrowth of Allena Gabosch's Beyond the Edge Cafe, which hosted BDSM related events. Several regulars of the cafe started discussing getting a dedicated space for their activities. One famously quoted "It would be great if we could get 200 members." In fact the idea became more popular than they envisioned; in its first year The Wet Spot registered about 2,000 members. In September 2007, they reached 10,000 registered members, although not all of them are current members. In 2007 the organization also changed its name to the Center for Sex Positive Culture and opened a second, "annex" building.

In November 2008 the Center for Sex Positive Culture was scrutinized in a KOMO-TV report regarding the Center's non-profit status, and the sexual activities which occur there. The story was criticized by Dan Savage and others for inaccuracies, and was later pulled from the station's website.

=== Building problems with new space, shutdown and acquisition of a new space ===
In the new space at Gallery Erato, The CSPC regrouped under the leadership of a new board, and started organizing events again, though at a lower frequency than the original location in Interbay. At the start of the COVID-19 global pandemic, both CSPC and Pan-Eros were required to cease in-person operations as of March 2020, which also led to the cancellation of that year's Seattle Erotic Arts Festival. Both organizations pivoted to online events, and in the middle of 2021, resumed some events with limited capacity and protective-measures in place.
