= Cyprus International Film Festival =

Film festival

- Location: Nicosia, Cyprus
- Established: 2006
- Language: International
- Website: cyiff.eu

The Cyprus International Film Festival (CYIFF) is an annual film festival held in Cyprus. The festival has taken place in Nicosia, Larnaca, Paphos and Limassol and, more recently, only in Nicosia, in cooperation with Cultural International Festivals.

== Description ==
The International Film Festival of Cyprus has operated since 2006 as an independent non-profit organisation. CYIFF is the first international film festival held in Cyprus with a competition section in categories that include feature, short, animation, video art/dance/music, humanitarian, sport, and children's films, devoted exclusively to independent emerging filmmakers. The category “Nostimon Imar” is dedicated to expatriate directors of Greek origin.

== Awards and features ==
The CYIFF Golden Aphrodite and other awards are selected by a jury committee; it also features seminars, workshops and conferences for upcoming directors.

The festival offers the opportunity to young aspiring directors from all over the world to present their work in front of a jury committee and to receive a form of recognition through one of the awards.

== See also ==
- List of Cypriot films
- Aphrodite
