= Two Arabesques =

Pair of arabesques composed for piano by Claude Debussy

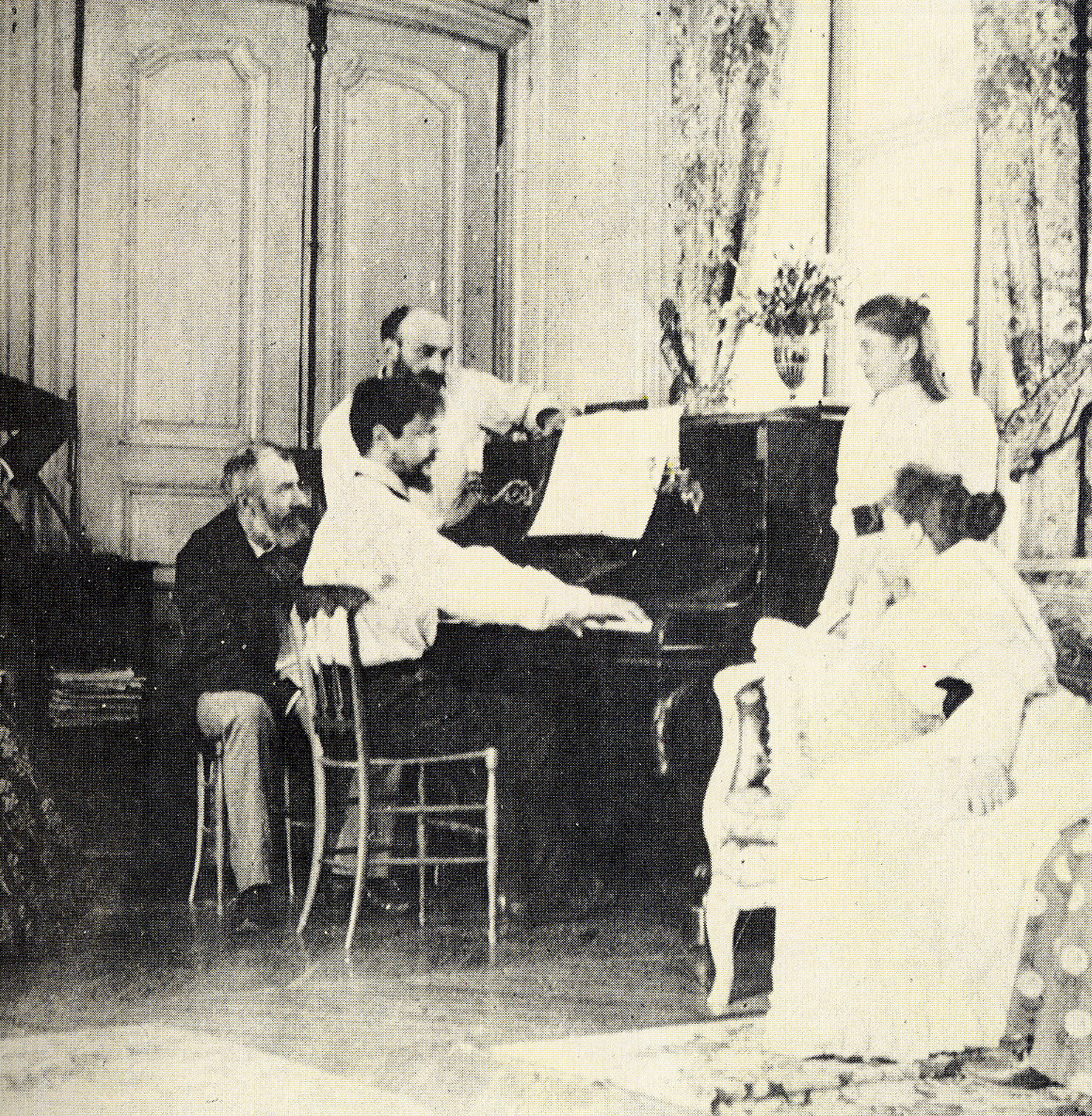
Claude Debussy at the piano in 1893

The Two Arabesques (Deux arabesques), L. 66, is a pair of arabesques composed for piano by Claude Debussy when he was still in his twenties, between the years 1888 and 1891.

The arabesques contain hints of Debussy's developing musical style. The set is one of the very early impressionistic pieces of music, following the French visual art form. Debussy seems to wander through modes and keys, and achieves evocative scenes throughout both pieces. His view of a musical arabesque was a line curved in accordance with nature, and with his music he mirrored the celebrations of shapes in nature made by the Art Nouveau artists of the time. Of the arabesque in baroque music, he wrote:

“That was the age of the ‘wonderful arabesque' when music was subject to the laws of beauty inscribed in the movements of Nature herself.”

== The arabesques ==
Première Arabesque (4:53)

Deuxième Arabesque (4:00)
Both pieces performed in 2016 by Patrizia Prati on piano at Madrid's Museum of Romanticism

The two arabesques are given these tempo marks:

1. Andantino con moto
2. Allegretto scherzando

=== 1. Andantino con moto ===
This arabesque is in the key of E major. The piece begins with parallelism of triads in first inversion, a composition technique very much used by Debussy and other Impressionists which traces back to the tradition of fauxbourdon. It leads into a larger section which begins with a left hand arpeggio in E major and a descending right hand E major pentatonic progression.

The second quieter B section is in A major, starting with a gesture (E–D–E–C♯), briefly passing through E major, returning to A major and ending with a bold pronouncement of the E–D–E–C♯ gesture, but transposed to the key of C major and played forte.

In the middle of the recapitulation of the A section, the music moves to a higher register and descends, followed by a large pentatonic scale ascending and descending, and resolving back to E major.

=== 2. Allegretto scherzando ===
The second arabesque in G major is noticeably quicker and more lively in tempo. It opens with left hand chords and right hand trills. The piece makes several transpositions and explores a lower register of the piano. Again notable is a hint of the pentatonic scale. It closes in a similar fashion to the first arabesque.

== In other media ==
The first piece was used as the theme to Star Gazers. It is also featured in the 2001 Japanese film All About Lily Chou-Chou along with other works from Debussy.

== See also ==
- Snowflakes Are Dancing, 1974 studio album by Japanese musician Isao Tomita
