= The Birds (Respighi) =

Orchestral suite by Ottorino Respighi

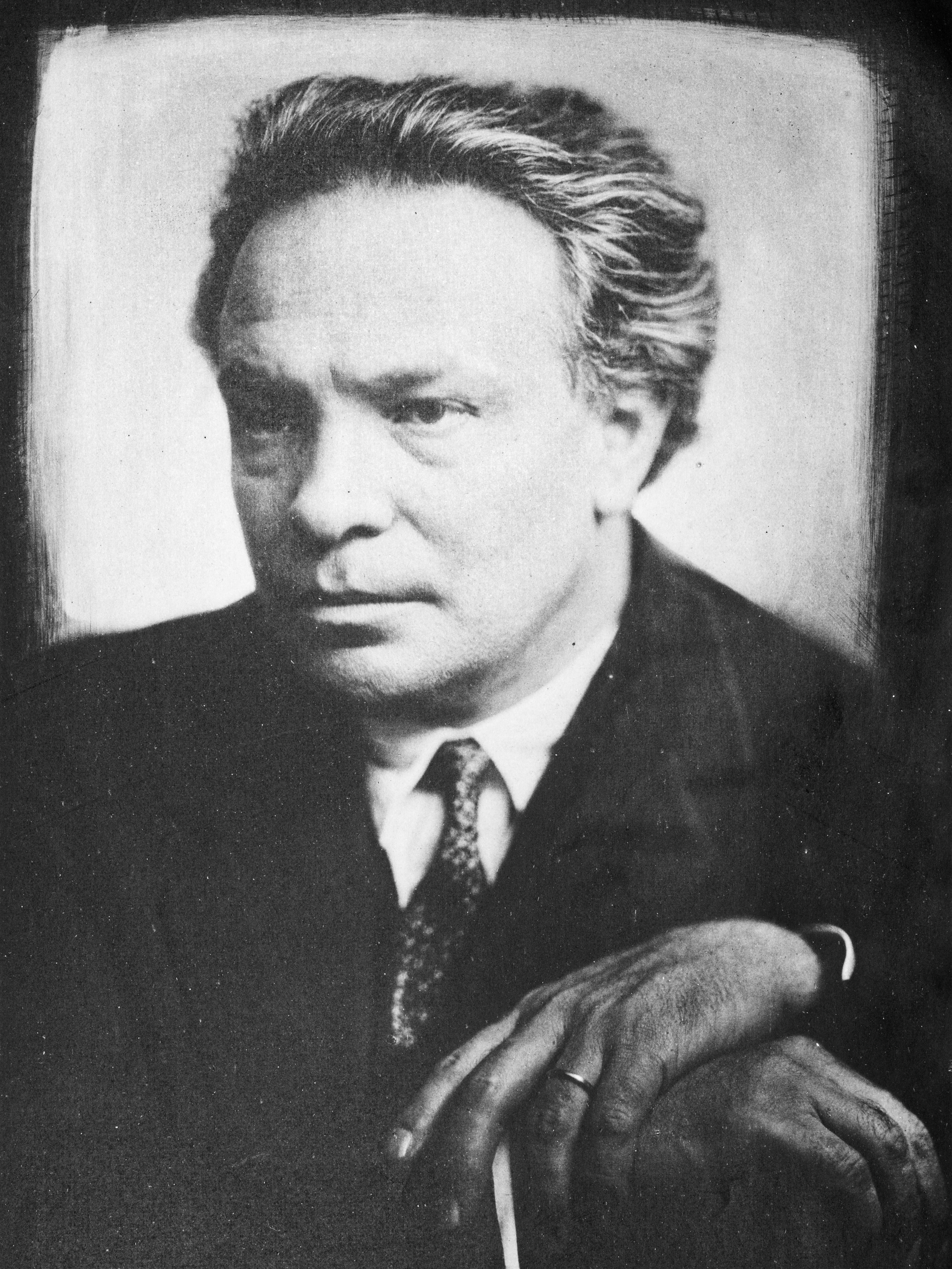
Ottorino Respighi in 1927

The Birds (Italian: Gli uccelli) is a suite for small orchestra by the Italian composer Ottorino Respighi. Dating from 1928, the work is based on music from the 17th and 18th centuries and represents an attempt to transcribe birdsong into musical notation, and illustrate bird actions, such as fluttering wings, or scratching feet.

The work is in five movements:

1. Prelude (based on the music of Bernardo Pasquini)
2. La colomba ("The dove"; based on the music of Jacques de Gallot)
3. La gallina ("The hen"; based on the music of Jean-Philippe Rameau)
4. L'usignuolo ("The nightingale"; based on the folksong "Engels Nachtegaeltje" transcribed by recorder virtuoso Jacob van Eyck)
5. Il cucù ("The cuckoo"; based on the music of Pasquini)

At least three of the movements make use of specific instruments picked to resemble birds. "La colomba" uses an oboe to resemble a dove. "La gallina" uses violins which are said to be "clucking in imitation of the gallinaceous beauty." "L'usignuolo" uses a woodwind over sylvan strings.

The suite was used for the ballet of the same name, with choreography by Cia Fornaroli, first performed at Sanremo Casinò Municipale on 19 February 1933; with choreography by Margarita Wallmann at the Teatro Colón, Buenos Aires, on 27 February 1940; and by Robert Helpmann, with design by Chiang Yee, by the Sadler's Wells Ballet at the New Theatre, London on 24 November 1942.

Between 1965 and 1977 the first movement was used as the opening and closing theme for the BBC TV series Going for a Song. The music played along with the sound of a bird in a cage automaton.

== Instrumentation ==
External audio
- You may hear Respighi's "The Birds" with Antal Dorati conducting the London Symphony Orchestra in a recording from 1959; Here on archive.org

- Woodwinds: 2 Flutes (2nd doubling Piccolo), Oboe, 2 Clarinets, 2 Bassoons
- Brass: 2 Horns, 2 Trumpets
- Keyboard: Celesta
- Strings: Harp, 1st and 2nd Violins, Violas, Cellos, Double Basses

== Reception ==
Discussing The Birds, John Mangum notes that it "serves as a reminder, in our own age of authenticity, that there are other ways to hear and enjoy Baroque music". Timothy Judd of the Listener's Club calls it "colorful, atmospheric, and cinematic"
