= Ministry of Freedom =

Budapest fetish club

The Ministry of Freedom club in Budapest is the only hedonist and fetish club in Hungary and the surrounding region.

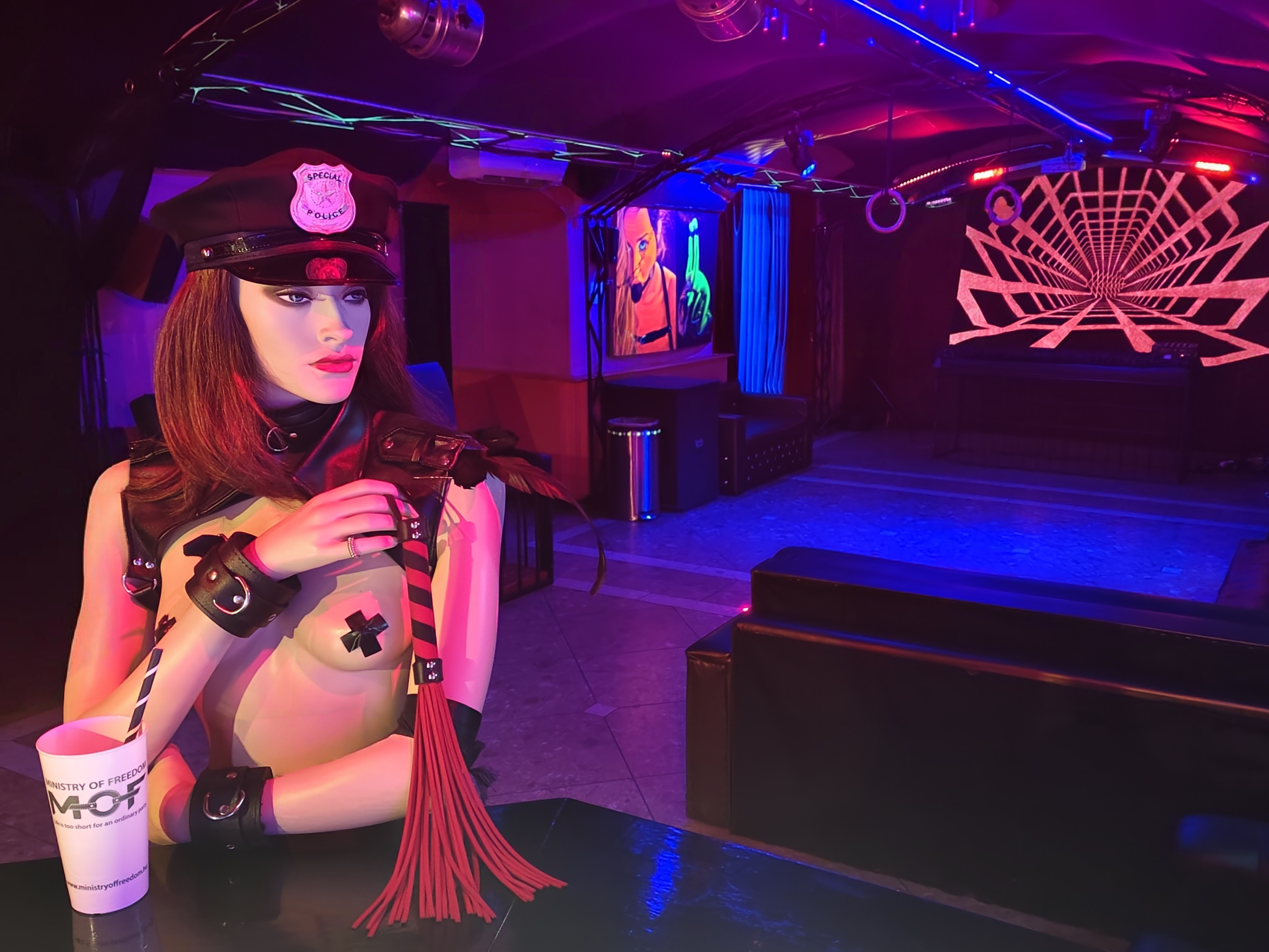
The club's iconic decorative piece is Lujza, a mannequin dressed in fetish clothing, who always stands by the bar with a drink, and guests often regard her as if she were a real person.

== Overview ==
The club is known for offering unusually high level of freedom (including open sexuality, regardless of identity or orientation), while being extremely strict about a few rules, immediately removing anyone who does not comply with the dress code, touches someone without verbal consent, or attempts to take photos.

The club treats its exact address as a secret, it is only given on the pre-purchased ticket.

The club holds events 1-3 times a week for lovers of sex-positive parties and curious people from all over the world. The Ministry of Freedom is the only place in East-Central Europe where weekly fetish parties are organized in addition to music/dance events, workshops, film screenings and theater performances are also held.

== The beginnings ==
The creation of the club was started in 2021 by the team of the Freedom Fetish party series (Hungary's largest fetish party), and it opened in February 2023 after renovation works and a few closed events. The goal was to create a secret free universe behind closed doors within the conservative Hungarian society.

In the initial months, it was open only on Saturdays and only 50-60 guests attended the parties per week, but this number doubled and then tripled in half a year. Full houses are common these days, when all tickets are sold long before the events.
