= Emigration from Mexico =

Mexicans moving abroad

Map of the Mexican diaspora around the world (including people with Mexican citizenship or children of Mexicans born abroad). Mexico + 1,000,000 + 100,000 + 10,000 + 1,000

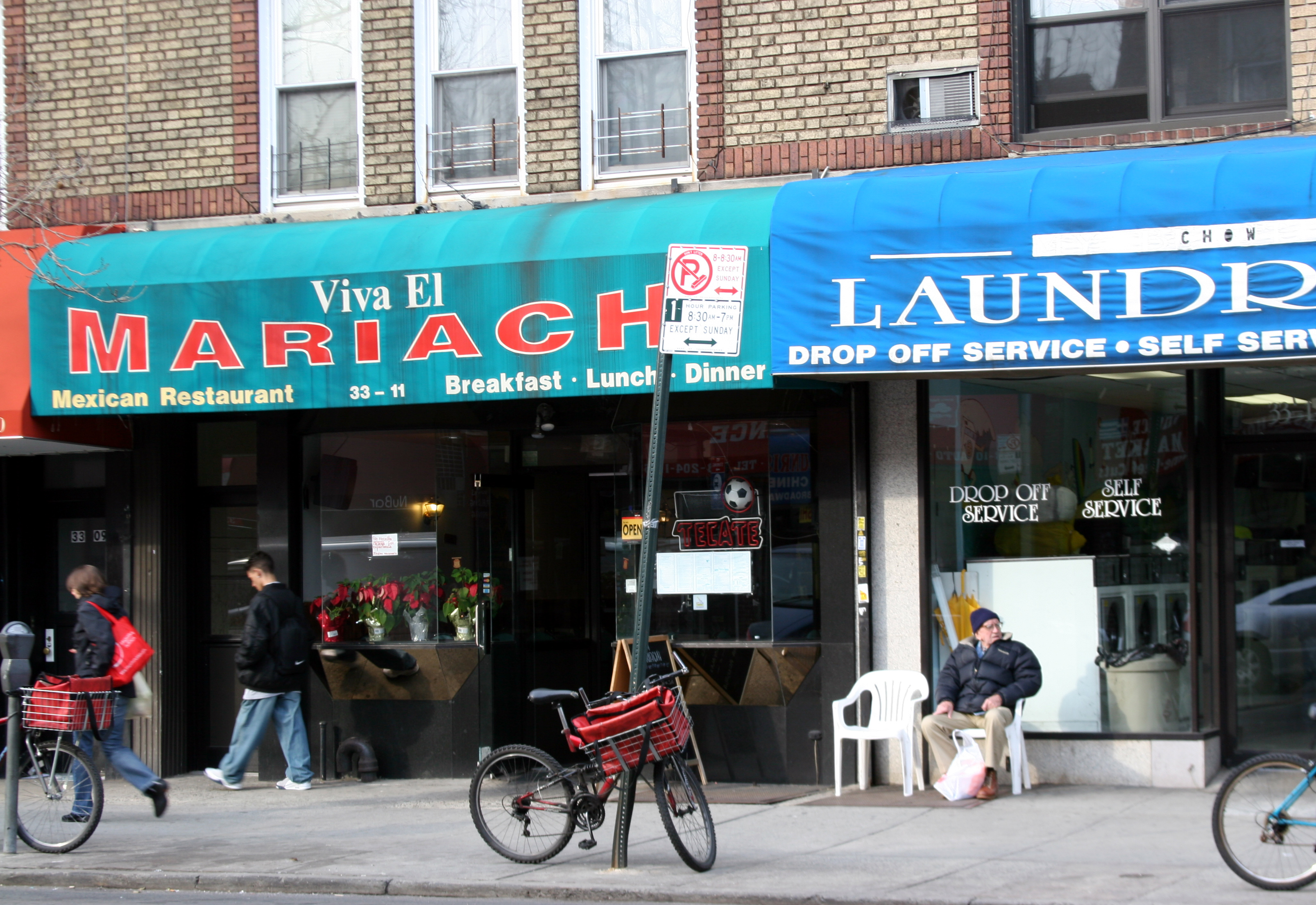
Mexican restaurant and shops in Astoria, Queens, NYC, United States.

Emigration from Mexico is the movement of people from Mexico to other countries. Emigration from Mexico has risen over the years.

== Overview ==
The United Nations listed Mexico among the top ten emigration nations during 1970 to 1995. The top destination by far is the United States, by a factor of over 150 to 1 compared to the second most popular destination, Canada. There are various reasons as to why people emigrate from Mexico such as the U.S needing low-skilled labor, or emigrants desiring to establish themselves and their families in the U.S. Furthermore, the patterns of immigration have changed over the years as laws and programs such as the U.S. Immigration Act of 1996, the Bracero Program, and the Immigration Reform and Control Act have affected migration. These programs, along with a heavy focus on the border in U.S politics, have led to many changes in where, how and why people emigrate. Following the U.S. in receiving immigrants from Mexico is Canada and Spain. However, the main place of immigration remains the U.S. Emigration to the U.S. increased in the period 2013-2018, as indicated in a report by the Pew Research Center which showed that, for the first time in years, more Mexicans were coming to the U.S. than leaving.

== Destinations ==
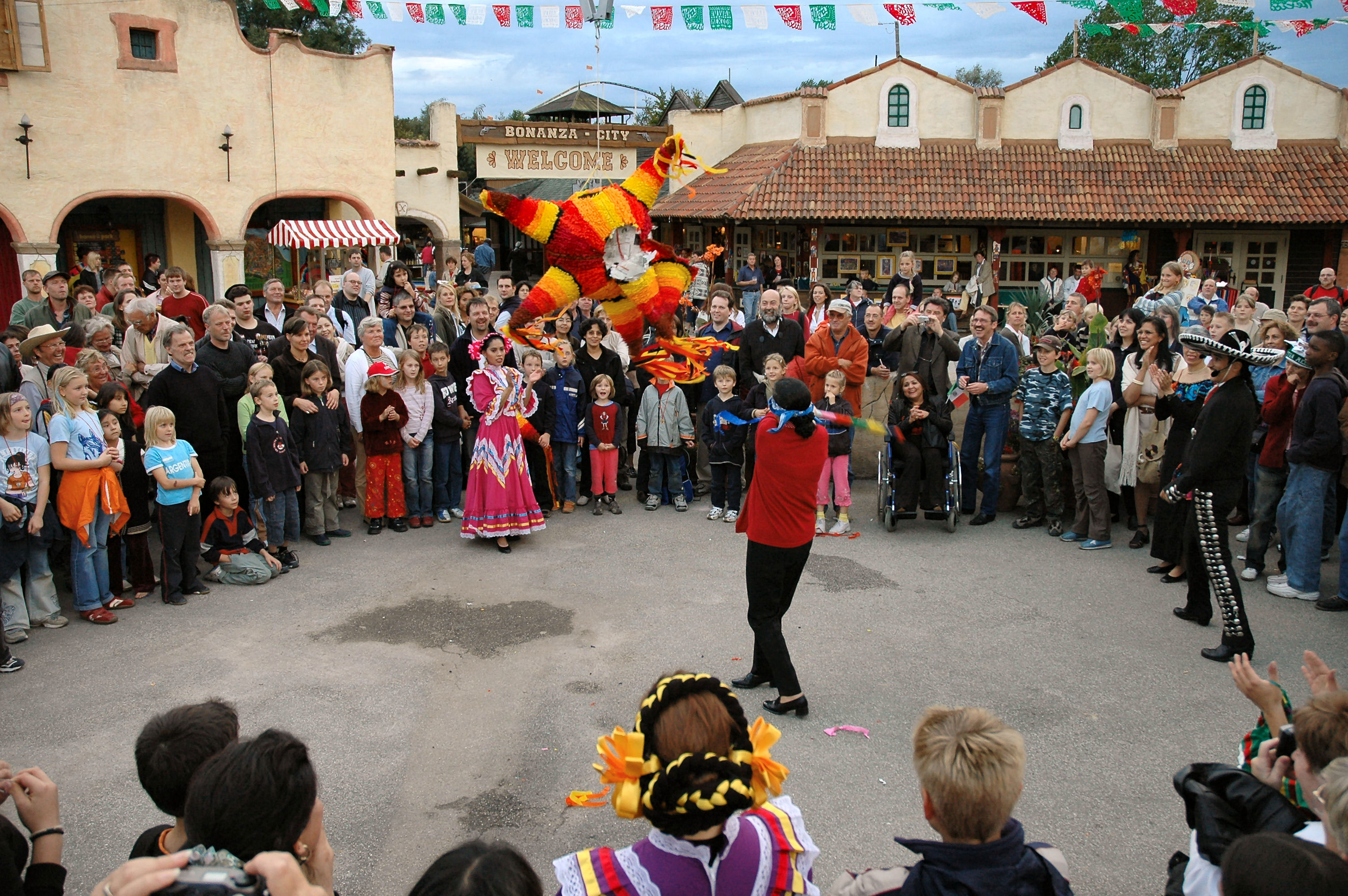
Piñata, Mexico Day in Germany.

Aside from the United States, Mexican immigrants have settled in Canada, Spain, Germany, Italy, the United Kingdom, France, Taiwan, Japan and other countries. A large Mexican immigrant population also exists in Central and South American countries as Guatemala, Costa Rica, Cuba, Brazil, Colombia, and Chile. Mexican Mennonites settled in Bolivia, Argentina and Paraguay. There have been cases of Mexicans working or residing in Saudi Arabia and other countries but not in demographically significant numbers. Under "Aliyah", or the immigration of Jews of the Diaspora to Israel, an unspecified number of Mexican Jews have immigrated to Israel. In recent years, Mexican business and engineering professionals have settled in African countries like Kenya, Nigeria, and South Africa.

Canada has a program that hires Mexican agricultural workers on a temporary basis. Many countries allow Mexicans opportunities in areas like science research, to study at colleges and universities, and through other cultural exchanges. The mass departure of artists, scientists, actors and more has led to a Mexican brain drain. However, recent years have shown an uptick in immigration to Mexico.

=== Estimates by country ===
The list below is of countries hosting Mexican descendent populations.

Rank	Country	Population	Year	Ref.
1	United States	37,991,500	2023	
2	Canada	155,380	2021	
3	Spain	53,158	—	
4	Guatemala	18,003	—	
5	Germany	16,892	—	
6	Australia	7,420	2020	
7	New Zealand	1,425	2018	
8	Finland	886	2020	
9	Greece	880	2020	
10	Portugal	863	2020	
11	South Korea	842	2020	
12	Hungary	674	2020	
13	Poland	625	2020	
14	Turkey	546	2020	
15	Philippines	377	—	
16	South Africa	374	2020	
17	Thailand	348	2020	
18	Russia	348	2020	
19	Venezuela	315	2020	
20	Taiwan	259	2023	
21	Nicaragua	235	2020	
22	Romania	224	2020	
23	Egypt	179	2020	
24	Haiti	168	2020	
25	Iceland	154	2020	
26	Jamaica	146	2020	
27	Malaysia	144	2020	
28	Serbia	106	2020	
29	Ukraine	100	2020	
30	Vietnam	95	—	
31	Trinidad and Tobago	87	2020	
32	Lithuania	68	2020	
33	Angola	60	2020	
34	Croatia	46	2020	
35	Cyprus	41	—	
36	Mozambique	37	2020	
37	Ghana	24	2020	
38	Tanzania	24	2020	
39	Cambodia	19	—	
40	Bulgaria	15	2020	
41	Barbados	14	—	
42	Laos	4	2020	
43	Dominica	3	2020	
44	Madagascar	3	2020	

== Migrants ==
Mexicans account for the biggest group of immigrants living in America, but the number of immigrants coming into the U.S. has started to decline. They primarily come from nine states: Zacatecas, Guanajuato, Michoacán, Oaxaca, Guerrero, San Luis Potosí, Hidalgo, Chiapas and Jalisco. In these states it is not uncommon to see towns where men have left in hope of finding work in the U.S. Often, while women stay in Mexico to take care of their children, husbands who find work in the U.S. send money to their families. This money, called remesas in Mexican Spanish, has become the second highest source of income that Mexico receives from other countries, second only to exports of petroleum and its products. The jobs people took up in Mexico often set the tone for the work Mexican immigrant will take up when they arrived in the United States. A survey has shown that families are not the only ones affected physically and emotionally by their migration, but it also affects the family members that were left behind.

Recent economic opportunities and advantages with international treaties, harassment, and threatening insecurity have induced even some affluent persons to leave the country. Many Mexicans envision this new ideology of living in a world that could give more economic opportunities. Not only were Mexicans focused on economic benefits but also social and cultural benefits.

Violence in Mexico is a result of political instability, drug cartel violence, and corruption, that leads to both internal and external migration, as well as unstable employment and lack of opportunity. Mexicans Immigrants endure multiple forms of violence during their transit and at their settlement. One of the most influential factors of why people are choosing to flee their country is due to the consistent occurrence of violence associated with the drug war that lead to disappearances, deaths, and kidnappings, as well as human rights violations by the military and police forces.

== History ==
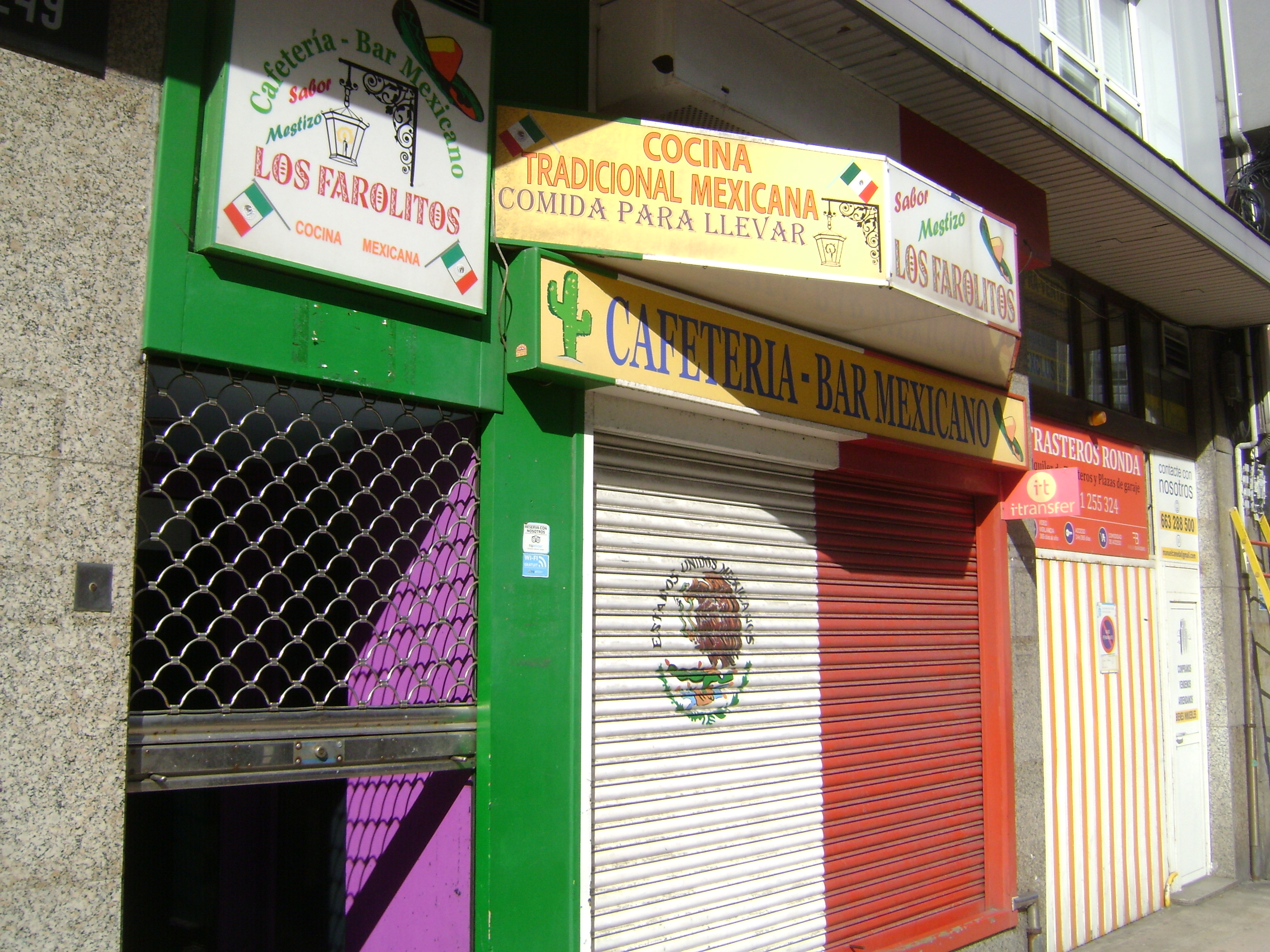
Mexican bar in Coruña, Galicia, Spain.

Following the Mexican–American War, which was concluded by the Treaty of Guadalupe Hidalgo in 1848, and later, the Gadsden Purchase in 1853, approximately 115,000 Mexicans living in present-day states stayed within the United States. Throughout the rest of the 19th century and early 20th century, Mexican migration was not subject to any restrictions, and Mexicans were free to move across the border, and often did so, typically in order for them to work in construction or in agriculture. From 1910 to 1920, the political violence and societal chaos caused by the Mexican Revolution also played a role in increasing migration northwards. Mexico's working-age population faced a shortage of jobs and depressingly low earning which was due to Diaz Notices that continued to benefit hacendados at the expense of campesinos. The impoverished campesinos in central Mexico started moving north in search of work, higher pay, and more affordable living conditions. On average, immigrants came from more advantageous background as the cost of migration limited poorer individuals from migrating. Economic inequality, rural poverty, significantly lower wages, and better opportunities have also played a role throughout the 20th century as factors pulling Mexicans to migrate to the US.

The immigration laws of the U.S. such as Emergency Quota Act generally allowed exemptions for Mexico, while being more restrictive to citizens of the Eastern Hemisphere. Mexicans received special allowances under U.S. immigration law due to the importance of Mexican labor in the U.S. economy. One example of these allowances is the Immigration Act of 1917. Under this act, all potential immigrants would have to pass a literacy test and pay a head tax. At the request of growers in the southwest who depended on farm labor from Mexico, the U.S. Secretary of Labor waived those requirements for Mexican immigrants. The groups interested in the availability of inexpensive labor ensured that the immigration laws in place throughout the early 20th century did not adversely affect the movement of Mexican migrants, in spite of calls on the part of some of the southern states' congressmen to put an end to the open border policies. The population of Mexican immigration took a turn. In the years between 2010 and 2017, the immigration numbers increased, with a reduction by 2014. In recent years, immigration has slowed down, as has the Mexican economy. More people have been counted returning to Mexico than immigrating to the U.S., with Mexico no longer being the main source of immigrants. From 2012 to 2016, most Mexican immigration was to California and Texas. In that period of time, Los Angeles, Chicago, and Houston were the largest cities with notable populations of Mexican immigrants.

== Effects of governmental policies on Mexican immigration in the U.S. ==
Major effects of governmental policies on Mexican immigration in the U.S. are as follows:

=== Restrictive regulations ===
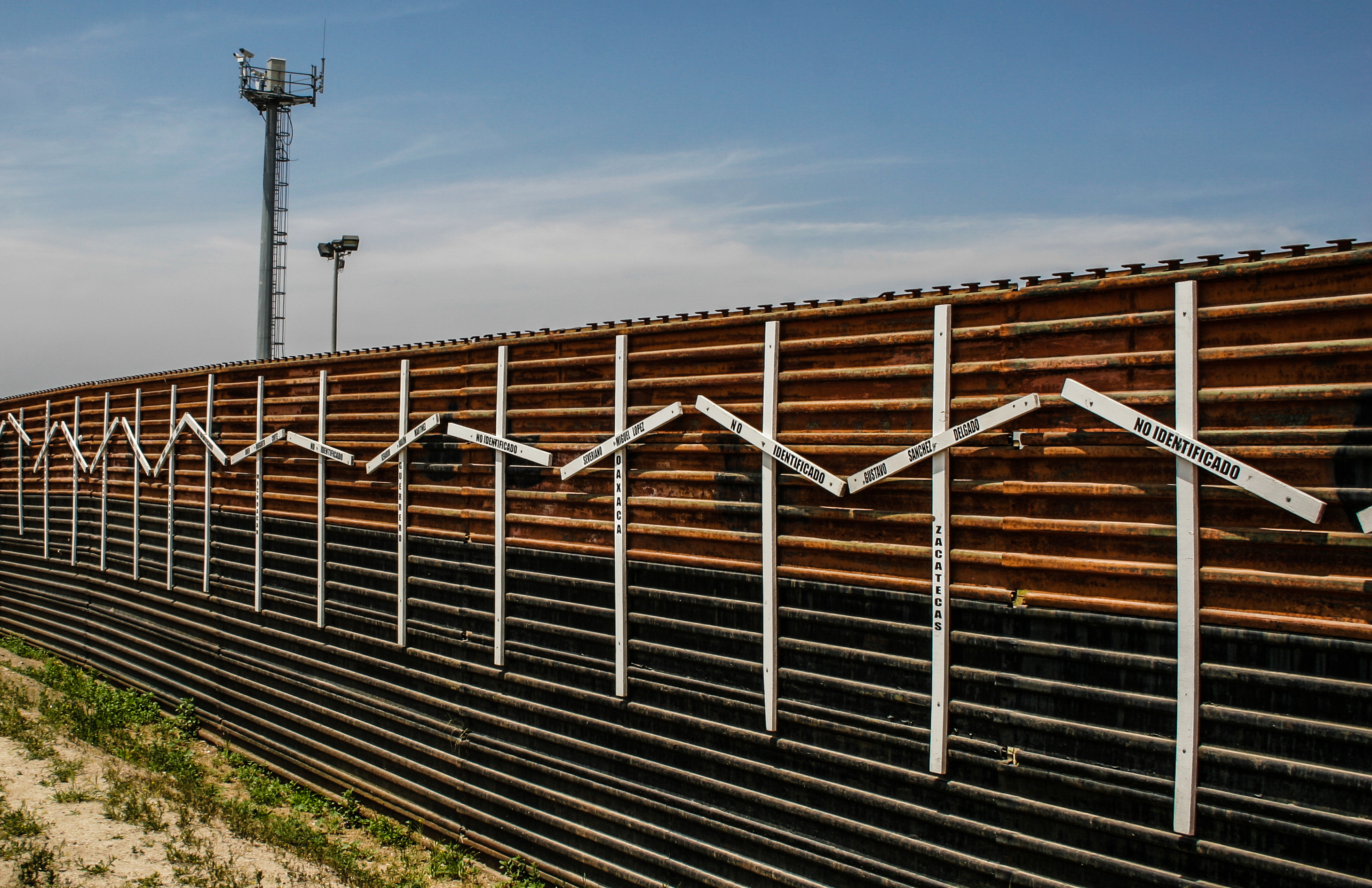
Mexico–United States barrier at the border of Tijuana, Mexico and San Diego, California. The crosses represent migrants who died in the crossing attempt. Some identified, some not. Surveillance tower in the background.

The Great Depression in 1929 brought an abrupt end to these allowances that had been made for the benefit of Mexican workers. In California, mass raids were executed in predominantly Mexican-American communities and sent either Mexicans or people with Mexican ancestry to Mexico without opportunity to return to the U.S. Overall, thousands of Mexicans were forced back across the border and barriers to future immigrants were constructed. From 1929 to 1931, legal Mexican immigration entries fell by 95%, and in the next ten years as many as 400,000 Mexican citizens were repatriated.

=== More admissive regulations ===
The limitations on Mexican immigration lasted until the beginning of World War II, when the U.S. found itself short of labor. In 1942 the U.S. and Mexico instituted the Bracero program. Under this arrangement, millions of Mexican laborers were contracted to agricultural work in the U.S. While under contract they were given housing and received a minimum wage of thirty cents an hour. The program was intended to provide the U.S. with temporary workers while many working-age residents were away at war. In order to ensure that braceros did not stay in the U.S., their wives and families were not allowed to accompany them. Additionally, 10% of each worker's wage was withheld to be given back upon the worker's return to Mexico, though few U.S. employers complied.

The Bracero Program displays that 4.6 million Mexican nationals took farm labor jobs, showing that this program had influenced many to come to the United States for work. These workers paved the way for many of the migrant labor programs in the U.S. today.

The Bracero Program allowed agribusiness access to a large pool of labor that had virtually no civil rights, and no recourse to address growing injustices. This inequity was seen in poor working conditions and the decrease in agricultural wages, which during the 1950s, actually dropped below the levels they were at during World War II. The U.S. did not report the conditions that immigrants faced, in fear that the Bracero Program would be jeopardized. Nor did Mexico and the U.S. agree on a contract which ensured the safety of the Mexican people. As the war ended, few returning soldiers returned to the jobs that the braceros were holding, and instead, they moved on to more industrial areas and reinforced the belief that immigrants take on the jobs that Americans would not be willing to do.

== Historical border issues ==
In response to the growing number of Mexicans entering illegally, the United States government implemented Operation Wetback in 1954. The racial term "Wetback" originated when Mexicans crossed the river Rio Grande in order to illegally reside in Texas. Under the direction of the Immigration and Naturalization Service (INS), the Border Patrol began deporting Mexicans who were in the United States illegally, and up to one million Mexicans were deported. Operation Wetback ended not long after its launch, due to the complaints regarding the violence involved in the deportations, and the fact that in many cases children who were United States citizens were deported with their immigrant parents.

=== Continuing migration ===
Although the Bracero Program ended in 1964, the migration of Mexican workers did not. The Immigration and Nationality Act of 1952 which had put limits on the total number of visas granted, was amended in 1965 following the termination of the Bracero Program. These amendments put an end to the quota system, and instead, created a total number of visas allowed to the Western Hemisphere. Exceptions to that total number were granted to spouses, minors and parents of United States citizens. However, the total allotment of 120,000 in 1965 still was not enough to address the demand for visas from Mexico. By 1976, there was a two-year waiting period for any eligible applicant from the Western Hemisphere before they could receive a visa.

=== Displaced workers in northern Mexico ===
A contributing factor to the persistently high numbers of migrants from Mexico was the creation of the Border Industrialization Program in 1965. The termination of the Bracero Program in 1964 had led to both a shortage of workers willing to work for lower wages in the United States, and a high population of displaced workers at the northern Mexico border. The result of this imbalance in the supply and demand of labor in the two countries in turn led the creation of this new agreement that allowed the construction of foreign-owned factories in northern Mexico. These factories are referred to as maquiladoras or maquilas, and provided both Mexico and the United States with a number of benefits. The factories provided Mexico with a way to increase its manufactured exports to the United States, and in return, the United States received tax benefits for placing its factories within Mexico. For example, the equipment imported into Mexico to be used in the factories was not subject to import taxes, and the final product was only taxed on the value that was added at the factory, rather than the entirety of the item.

The creation of the maquilas program provided jobs to the displaced Bracero Program workers and allowed the United States to continue to use labor from Mexico, which was less expensive than labor in the United States. The popularity of this program is evident in the incredible increase in the number of maquilas in operation: in 1967 there were 57 maquiladoras operating in Mexico; less than ten years later in 1976, that number had increased to 552. The rise in the number of available jobs in the region led to an extreme swell in the population of the border towns. The maquiladora industry employed 4000 people in 1967, and by 1981 that amount grew to more than 130,000. The maquilas drew the population north to the border in search of employment opportunities, but in many cases the northward pull did not stop there. The proximity of the United States with its markedly higher standard of living continued to pull the people who had migrated to border region even farther north, and led to higher numbers of migrants crossing the United States – Mexico border.

Amendments to the Immigration and Nationality Act continued throughout the 1970s. In 1976 the United States Congress imposed a limit of 20,000 visas per country per year in the Western Hemisphere. At that time Mexico was exceeding that amount by approximately 40,000. In 1978 a new amendment was put in place that enacted a worldwide immigration policy, allowing 290,000 visas per year total, with no limitations per country.

The end of the Bracero Program combined with restrictions put on the number of visas allowed by the United States greatly increased the levels of illegal migration from Mexico. As a response, in 1986 the United States enacted the Immigration Reform and Control Act (IRCA). Under this act, all undocumented migrants living in the United States as of January 1, 1982, as well as those who had labored in the seasonal agriculture work for at least ninety days during the previous years were granted legal residence. IRCA also made it possible to impose civil and criminal penalties on any employer who knowingly hired undocumented workers. Although a legalization of current undocumented workers, coupled with the increase in penalties suffered by employers who employed future undocumented workers was meant to decrease the total number of undocumented migrants in the United States, the actions did not produce the desired effect; as is evidenced by the number of apprehensions achieved through border patrolling.

== Reversal of net migration between Mexico and the U.S. ==
Pew Research Center statistics found approximately equal amounts of migration in both direction for the period 2005–2010, with net migration toward Mexico of about 130,000 people from 2009 to 2014. Pew found this trend reversed again for the period 2013–2018, with net migration of about 160,000 people toward the United States.

=== Reasons for trend reversal ===
Several major factors contribute to a general sense among Mexican migrants and potential migrants that there is less profit and more danger to migrate to the U.S., leading many of them to decide that it is better to leave the U.S. or to stay in Mexico:

- The decline of fertility in Mexico has resulted in proportionally fewer young people, and thus lower migration to the U.S.
- The Great Recession led to a decline of work opportunities in the U.S., meaning that many migrants who moved to the U.S. for work couldn't find any. Access to social security, healthcare and education in the U.S. has also become more difficult.
- The economic situation in Mexico has become better, ensuring better access to healthcare, education, and jobs. This reduces the incentive for Mexicans to leave the country.
- Since 2010, U.S. legislation has placed stricter controls on illegal immigration: several American states have criminalized illegal immigration. Deportations under the Obama administration (2009-2017) reached record numbers.
- During the last few years, violence associated with drug cartels and organized crime has been on the rise in Northern Mexico, making the routes for passing the border more dangerous.

Mexicans and Americans Thinking Together (MATT) conducted 600 in-depth, in-person interviews of migrants who returned to the Mexican state of Jalisco, and found that family reasons and nostalgia are the primary cited reasons for return migration to Mexico. The research also found that of the interviewed migrants who moved back to Mexico, only about 11% were forced to leave the United States due to being deported. 75% of the respondents cited that their reasons for return migration were self-motivated.

=== Developments in Mexico ===
Mexican source communities, mostly indigenous villages, are most often poor. To survive economically, such areas rely heavily on the emigration of some of their members and on the remittances they send back. Furthermore, research suggests that Mexican households are equal in authority and control over resources, which predicts the emigration of their male partners to the U.S. Emigration can function as an escape valve to alleviate economic pressures, as it provides a source of income and opens up work opportunities in villages of origin. The return of many migrants thus causes great stress on these communities, who are heading for economic crisis as important sources of income fall away and more people become unemployed as there is less work available. The states most affected by this phenomenon try to take action to help those who come back, but the full economic impact of the return of migrants is still to come.

While emigrants return to their (mostly poor) home communities, sending them into economic crisis, another migration phenomenon is accelerating: internal migration. The lack of work opportunities in small villages drives people to migrate to large cities, rather than to the U.S. with almost 80% of the Mexican population living in urban zones in Mexico. Urban violence and crime, stunted growth, malnutrition, poor elementary education, poor hygiene and inadequate sanitation are just some of the implications of life in urban slums. According to UNICEF, urban migration has badly worsened the reach of social schemes of health and nutrition.

Among communities of origin, there is a widespread ambivalence towards migrants, as the money they send back is welcome, but there is resentment against the cultural changes that they bring with them when they come back. Returning migrants are blamed for bringing with them drug use, sexually transmitted diseases, and antisocial behavior. They are held responsible for the abandonment of the traditional indigenous way of life as they bring back western cultural habits and material culture. The return of migrants to Mexico thus has important cultural repercussions and changes the face of their home communities forever.

=== Developments in the U.S. ===
In 2016, Hispanics were estimated to account for nearly 20% of the US labor force by 2024. Furthermore, nearly 60% of Hispanic Americans are of Mexican origin. This sector constitutes a non-negligible part of the U.S. economy. With the current migration trends, within a few years, Mexico will not be able to cover current demand for Mexican labor of its neighbor anymore. Migration from Venezuela, Guatemala, and the Dominican Republic to the U.S. is rising, as their migrants begin to replace Mexican workers. It is however unclear whether other Hispanic American countries follow these trends, and it is unsure whether the gap left by returning Mexicans will be filled by such migrants. Jeffrey Passel, chief demographer of the Pew Center, says the consequences for the U.S. economy may be important.

Since 2010, deportations of illegal immigrants have increased, as deportation procedures became more systematic and border controls were reinforced with police and military patrols. Several states, such as Arizona and Alabama, have implemented laws that permit police officers, during any lawful stop, detention, or arrest, to investigate an individual's immigration status if they have "reasonable suspicion" that the person may be unlawfully present in the United States. Proposed acts that offer easier paths to U.S. citizenship for immigrants, such as the DREAM Act, have been rejected. Continuing on over into 2015, during President Donald Trump's presidency, he reinforced harshly on enforcing immigration laws nationwide and specifically at the Southern border. One of the many actions he done to make sure these immigration restrictions were enforced is he ended the Deferred Action for Childhood Arrivals (DACA) program

== See also ==
- Demographics of Mexico
- Foreign relations of Mexico
- Immigration to Mexico
- Mexican Repatriation
