= Mexican immigration to Costa Rica =

Mexicans in Costa Rica Mexicanos en Costa Rica
Total population
- 8,000 (2022)

Regions with significant populations
- San José, Heredia, Liberia, Alajuela.

Languages
- Mexican Spanish

Religion
- Roman Catholicism and Protestantism

Related ethnic groups
- Mexicans of European descent, Indigenous peoples of Mexico, Mestizos in Mexico

Mexican immigration to Costa Rica comprises people who emigrated from Mexico to Costa Rica and their descendants. Costa Rica has the most Mexicans living in Central America, aside from Guatemala. The waves of migration from Mexico to Costa Rica started from 1970s, as they were attracted by a stable democracy, a mild climate and political stability that characterizes this country south of Central. The Mexican population in Costa Rica reaches more than 5,000 people who exercise as professionals, doctors, secretaries, among other services. Costa Rica is the seventh destination for Mexican immigrants in the world, and first in Hispanic America. Unlike other destinations, most Mexicans who immigrate to Costa Rica are mainly from Nuevo León, Tamaulipas, Chihuahua, Baja California and Mexico City. Despite having more cultural elements similar to the northern countries of Central America, such as Guatemala, Mexicans in Costa Rica are quickly assimilated by the Costa Rican population. From 2010, a new wave of Mexican immigrants began coming to Costa Rica, and these are mainly young professionals, who find no opportunities in their country, migrate to the Central American country. Many others are running away from the waves of violence following the war against drug trafficking in Mexico.

One of the growing destinations for the Mexican population in the 21st century is Costa Rica, becoming the Central American nation with the largest population of Mexican citizens, exceeding immigration into Panama and Guatemala. Mexicans who migrate to Costa Rica are generally young families looking for development opportunities and job growth. Mexicans in Costa Rica numbered 2,327 in 2005.

== See also ==
- Immigration to Costa Rica
- Demographics of Costa Rica
- Mexican diaspora
- Costa Rica–Mexico relations
