= Costa Rica–Mexico relations =

Costa Rica-Mexico relations
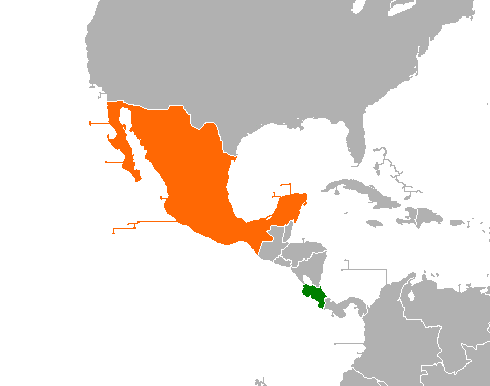

- Costa Rica: Mexico

The nations of Costa Rica and Mexico established diplomatic relations 1838. Both nations are members of the Association of Caribbean States, Community of Latin American and Caribbean States, Organization of American States, Organization of Ibero-American States and the United Nations.

== History ==
Costa Rica and Mexico are two Latin American nations that share a common cultural history from the Nahuas and the Oto-Manguean people that inhabit both central Mexico and the Guanacaste province in northwestern Costa Rica. The two nations also share a common history in the fact that both nations were colonized by the Spanish Empire. During Spanish colonization, Costa Rica was under the administration of the Viceroyalty of New Spain in Mexico City.

In 1821, Mexico gained independence from Spain and Costa Rica became a part of the First Mexican Empire. In 1823, the empire dissolved and Costa Rica, along with El Salvador, Guatemala, Honduras and Nicaragua joined the United Provinces of Central America. In 1831, Mexico established diplomatic relations with the United Provinces, however, in 1838 the union dissolved and Costa Rica became an independent nation. That same year, Costa Rica and Mexico established diplomatic relations.

In March 1948, Costa Rica entered into a civil war. During the war, the ambassadors of Chile, Mexico, Panama and the United States met at the premise of the Mexican embassy in San José and agreed to mediate between both belligerents of the war to bring them to a peaceful resolution. This was known as the Pacto de la embajada de México. The war ended in April 1948 and Costa Rica entered into its 'Second Republic.'

The 1960s were an important decade for both nations as their respective Presidents paid official visits to each other's nations, starting with Mexican President Gustavo Díaz Ordaz traveling to Costa Rica in 1966. A year later, Costa Rican President José Joaquín Trejos Fernández paid a visit to Mexico in 1967. There would be several more visits between leaders of both nations.

During the central-American wars taking place in neighboring El Salvador, Guatemala and Nicaragua; both Costa Rica and Mexico led mediation dialogues between warring factions in each nation in order to bring peace and stability to the region. Mexico (along with Colombia, Panama and Venezuela) created the Contadora Group which helped create the framework for the Esquipulas Peace Agreement, led by Costa Rica's President Oscar Arias.

In 2021, Costa Rican President Carlos Alvarado Quesada paid a visit to Mexico and met with Mexican President Andrés Manuel López Obrador.

== High-level visits ==
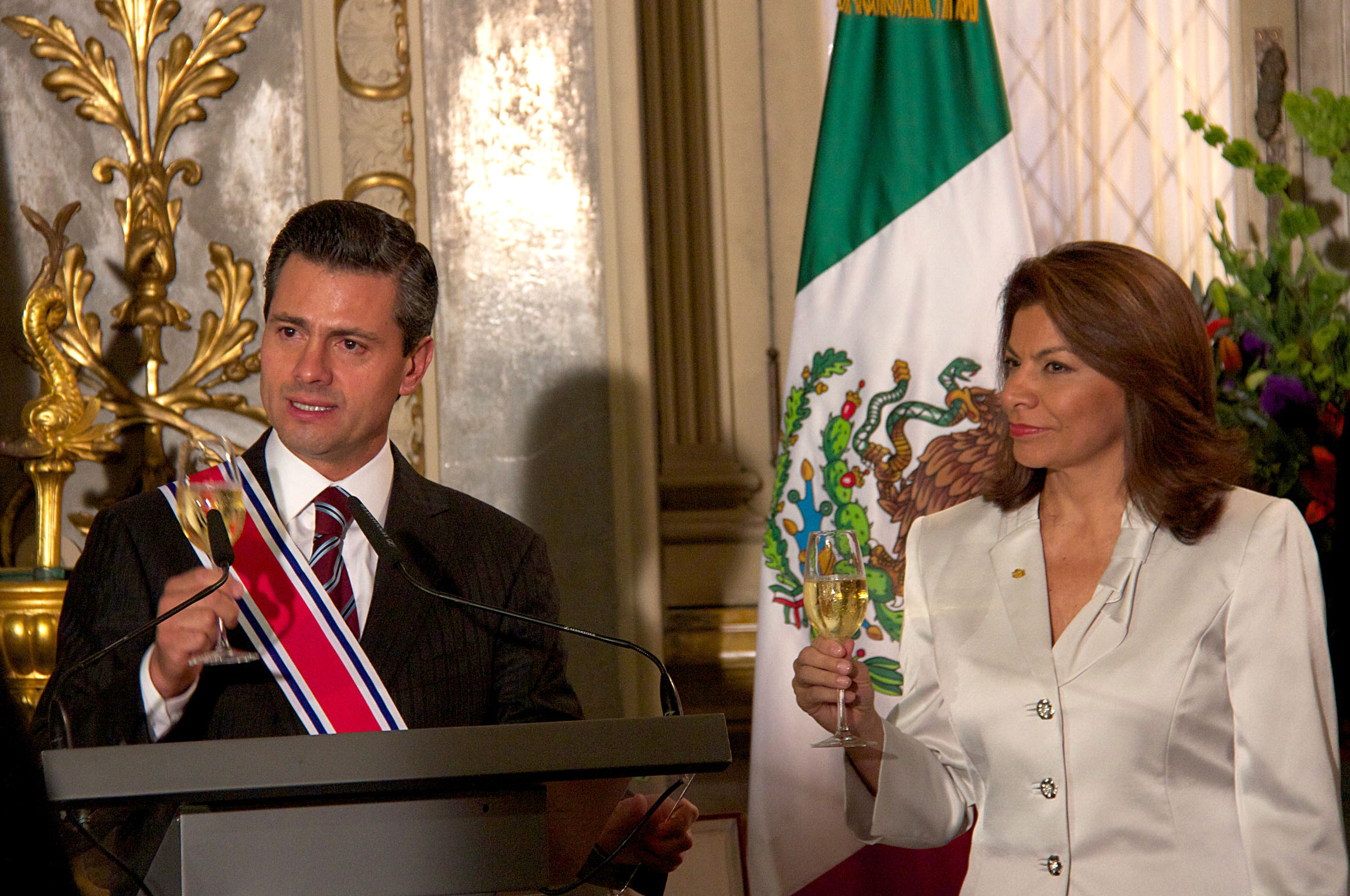
Costa Rican President Laura Chinchilla and Mexican President Enrique Peña Nieto in San José; February 2013.

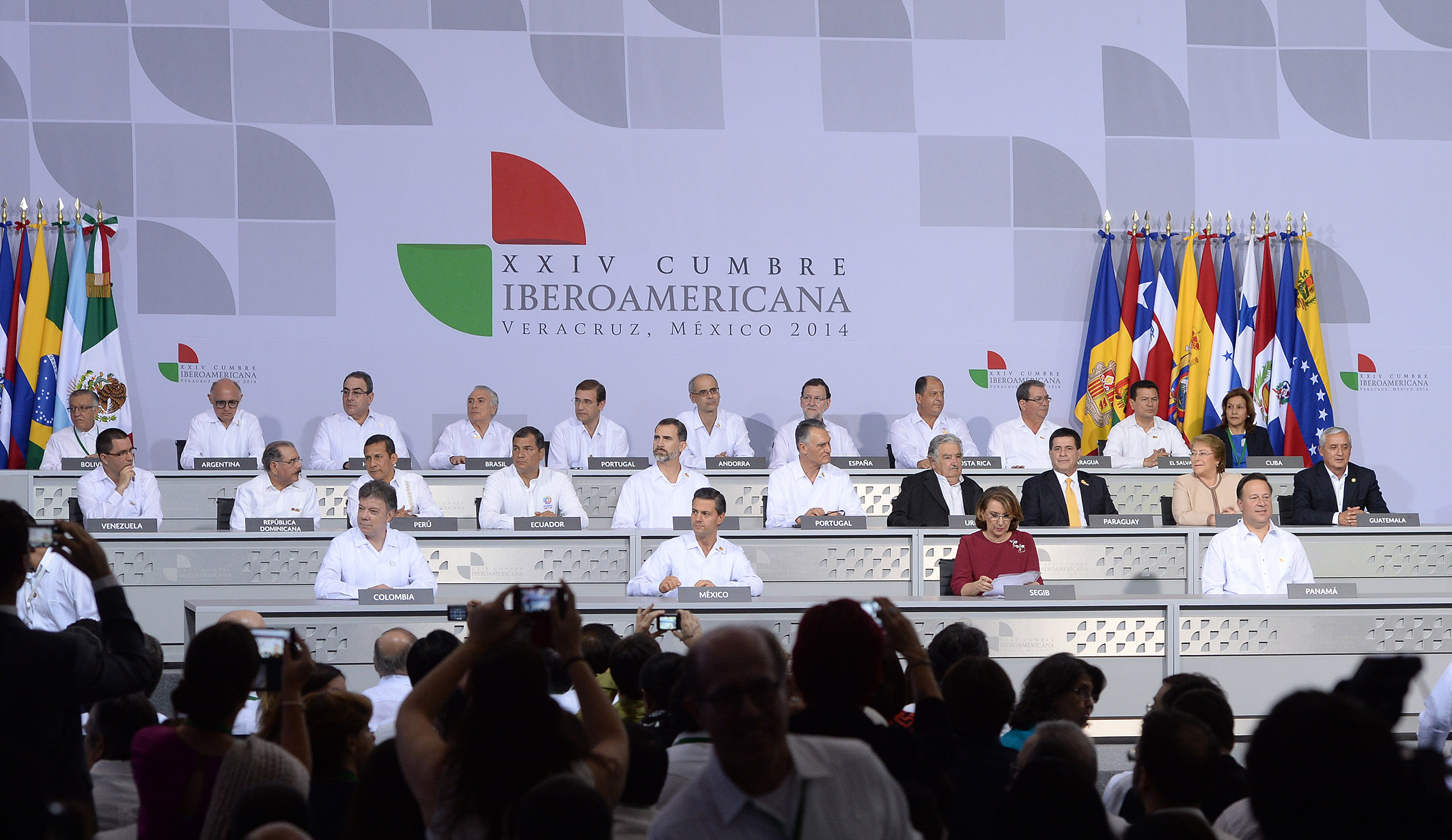
Costa Rican President Luis Guillermo Solís attending the Ibero-American Summit in Veracruz City, Mexico; 2014.

Presidential visits from Costa Rica to Mexico

- President José Joaquín Trejos Fernández (1967)
- President José Figueres Ferrer (1971)
- President Rodrigo Carazo Odio (1979)
- President Óscar Arias (1987, 2009, 2010)
- President Rafael Ángel Calderón Fournier (January, February, May & July 1991, 1992, 1994)
- President José María Figueres Olsen (1994)
- President Miguel Ángel Rodríguez (January, June & November 2000; 2001, 2002)
- President Abel Pacheco de La Espriella (2004)
- President Laura Chinchilla (2011)
- President Luis Guillermo Solís (2014)
- President Carlos Alvarado Quesada (2021)

Presidential visits from Mexico to Costa Rica

- President Gustavo Díaz Ordaz (1966)
- President Carlos Salinas de Gortari (1992)
- President Ernesto Zedillo (1999)
- President Vicente Fox (2002, 2004, 2005, 2006)
- President Felipe Calderón (2009, 2010)
- President Enrique Peña Nieto (2013)

== Bilateral agreements ==
Both nations have signed several bilateral agreements such as an Agreement on Telegraph Exchanges (1931); Agreement on Touristic Cooperation (1980); Agreement of Cooperation to Combat Drug Trafficking and Drug Dependency (1989); Agreement on Air Transportation (1991); Agreement on Educational and Cultural Cooperation (1995); Treaty on the Execution of Criminal Judgments (1999); Treaty for the Recovery and Return of Stolen Vehicles and Aircraft or Matter of Illicit Disposition (2000); Agreement on Strategic Association (2009); Agreement on the Exchange of Information in Tax Matters (2011); Extradition Treaty (2011); Treaty of International Criminal Law Assistance (2012); Agreement on Development Cooperation (2013) and an Agreement to Avoid Double Taxation and Prevent Tax Evasion in Income Tax (2014).

== Transportation ==
There are direct flights between both nations with Aeroméxico, Avianca Costa Rica, Volaris and Volaris Costa Rica.

== Trade relations ==
In 1995, Costa Rica and Mexico signed a free trade agreement. In 2023, two-way trade between both nations amounted to US$2.5 billion. Costa Rica's main exports to Mexico include: electronic integrated circuits, computer processors and palm oil. Mexico's main exports to Costa Rica include: televisions, vehicles, electronics, medicines, and food based products. Several Mexican multinational companies such as América Móvil, Cemex, Cinépolis, FEMSA, Grupo Bimbo, Gruma and Sigma Alimentos (among others) operate in Costa Rica.

== Resident diplomatic missions ==
- Costa Rica has an embassy in Mexico City.
- Mexico has an embassy in San José.

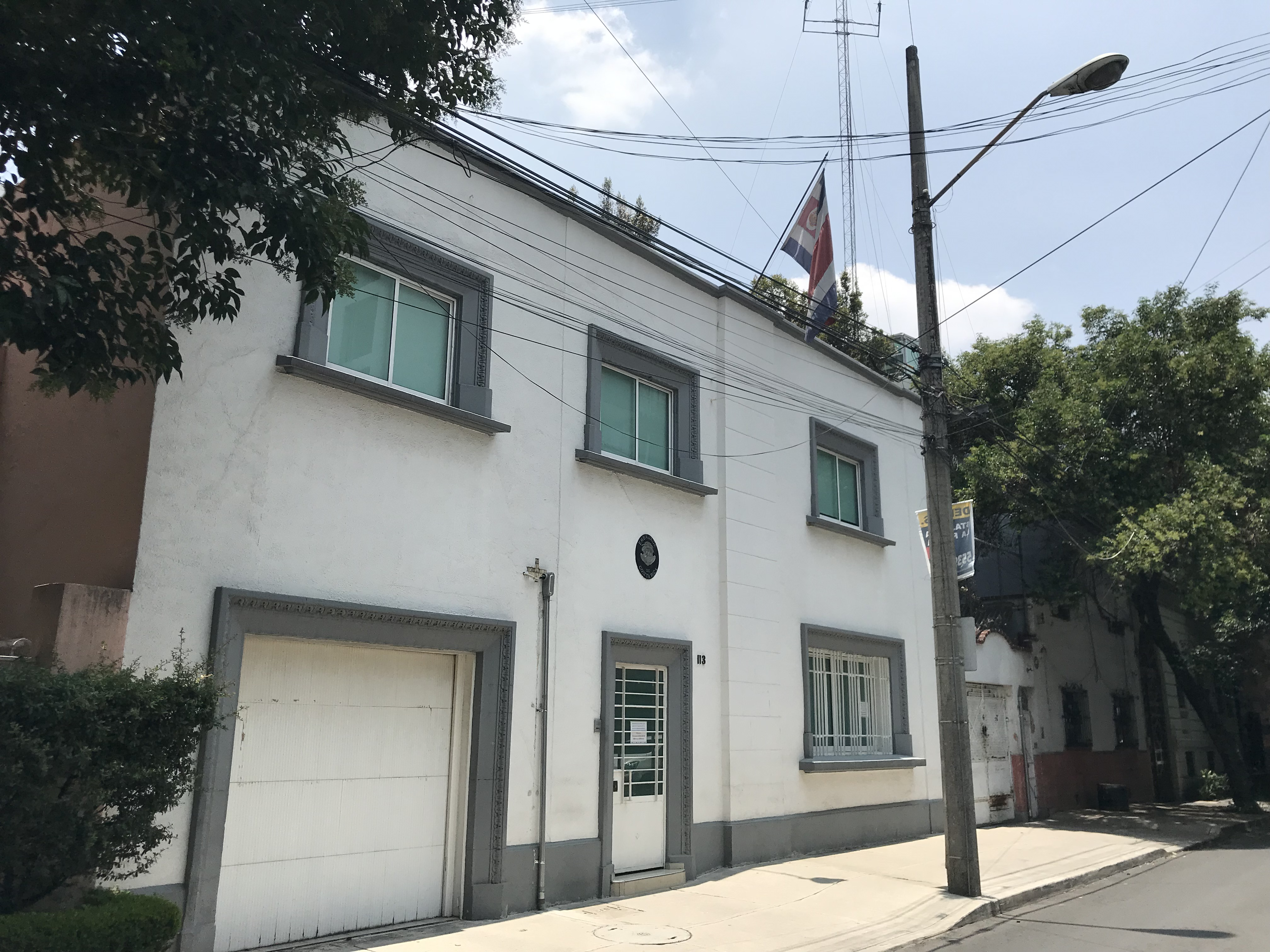
Embassy of Costa Rica in Mexico City

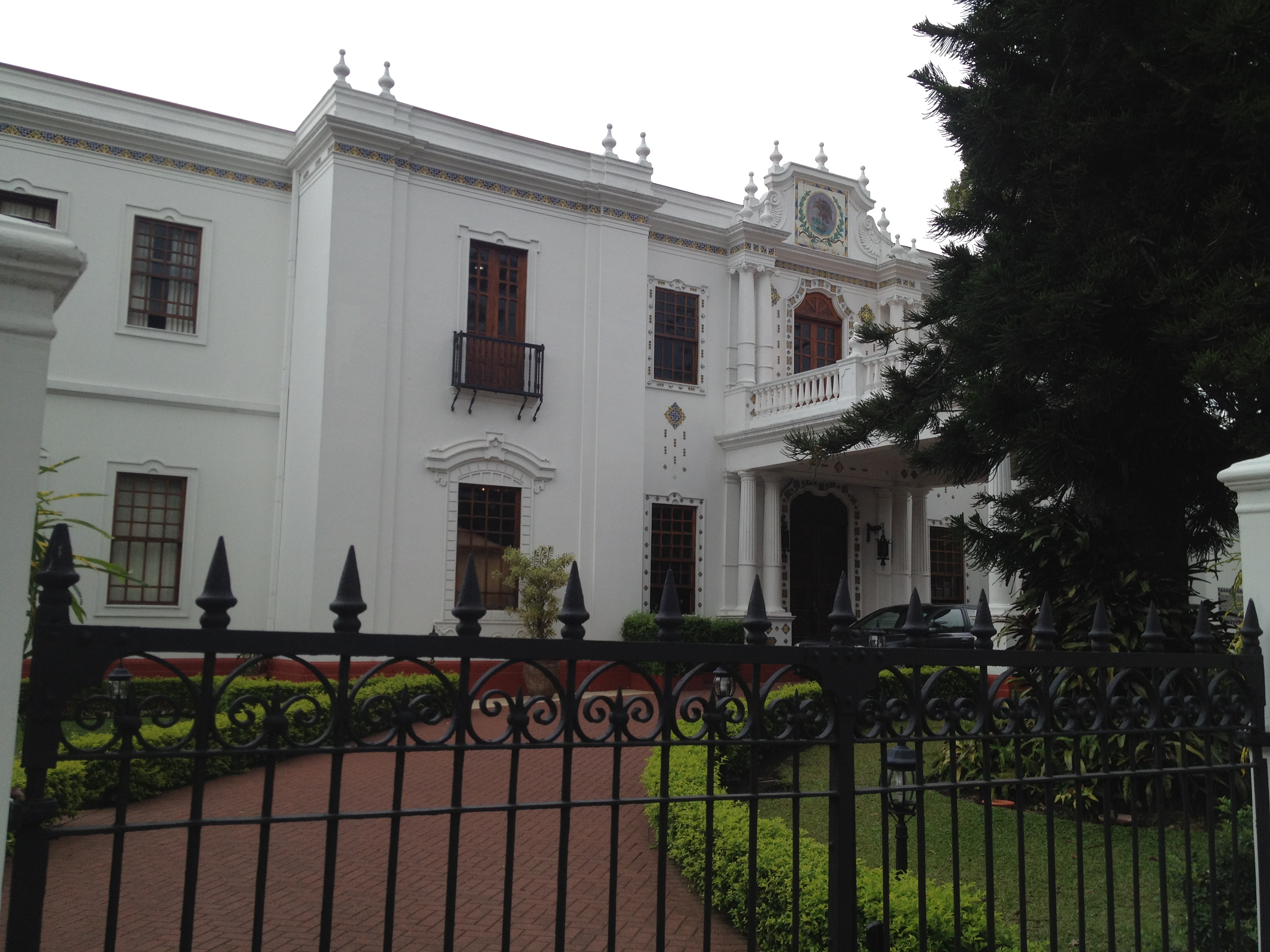
Embassy of Mexico in San José

== See also ==
- Costa Ricans
- Mexican immigration to Costa Rica
