= Germany–Mexico relations =

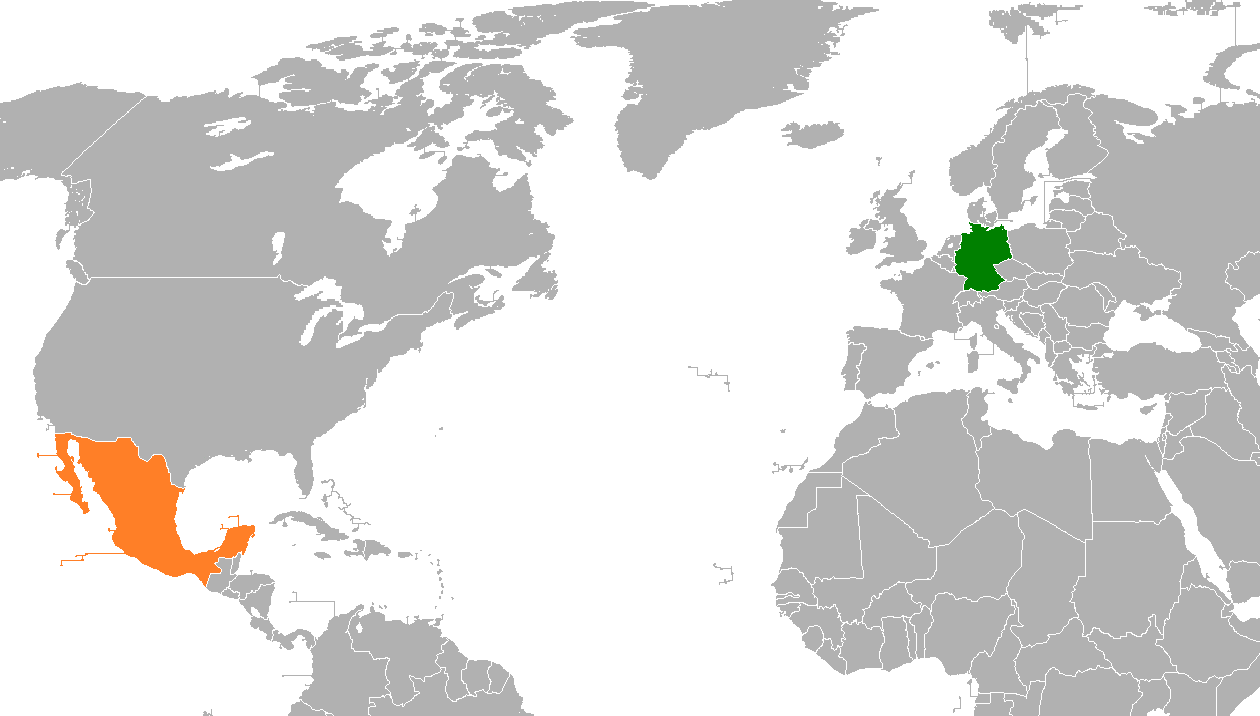

- Germany: Mexico

The nations of Germany and Mexico first established formal diplomatic relations in 1879, following the unification of Germany. In 1917, the German Empire proposed a World War I alliance with Mexico against the United States in the Zimmermann Telegram before it was foiled by British intelligence agents. The two nations were twice on the opposite sides of 20th century conflicts: first in the Spanish Civil War from 1936 to 1939, and later during World War II from 1942 to 1945. Mexico established relations with both halves of partitioned Germany in 1952 and maintained the relationship through the German reunification in 1990.

Both nations are members of the G-20 major economies, Organisation for Economic Co-operation and Development and the United Nations.

== History ==
=== 19th century ===
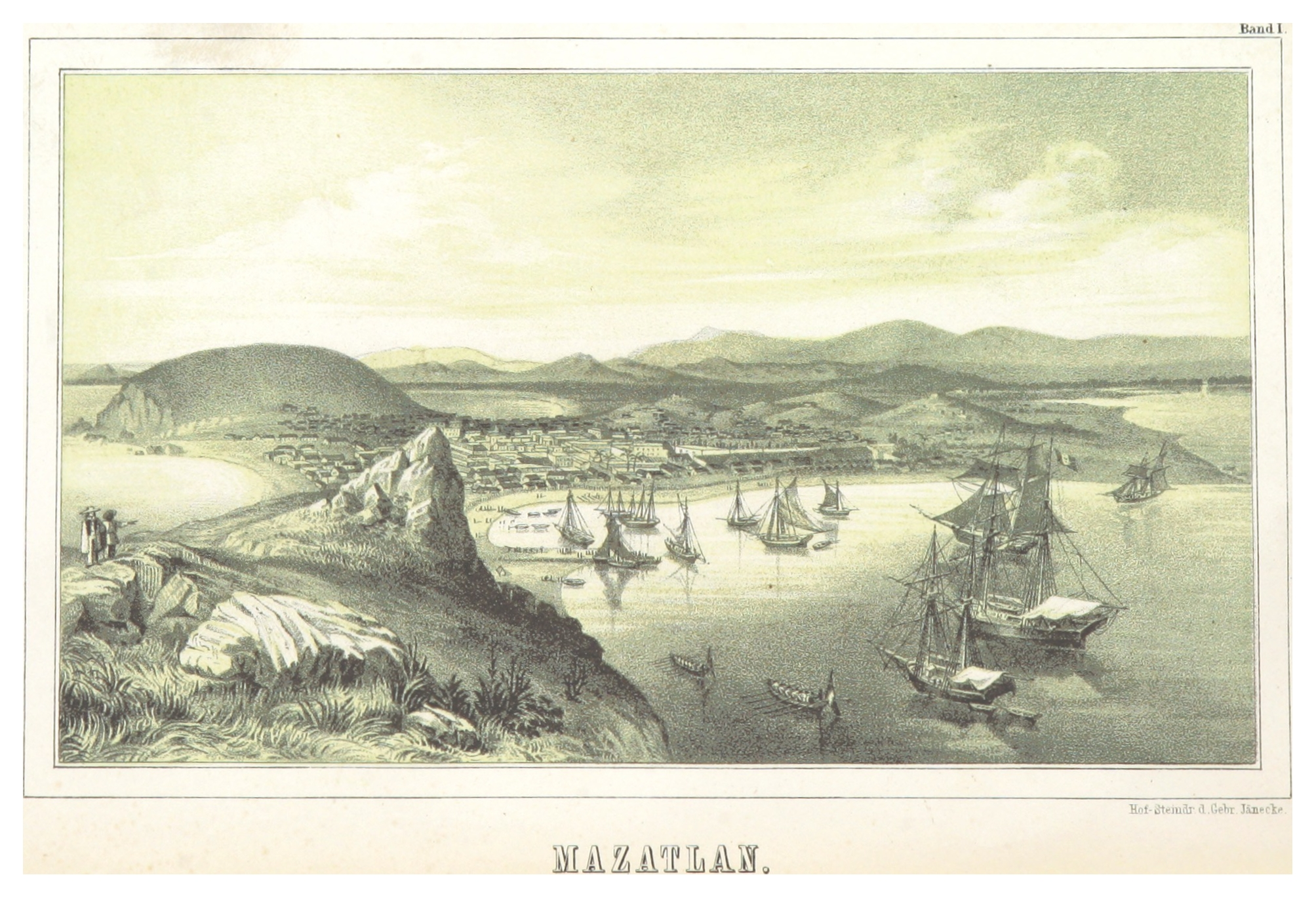
The Pacific coast port of Mazatlán as drawn by a German migrant. The port and the town's brewing industry were developed by German immigrants living there in the early 19th century.

German clergy and technical mining personnel arrived in colonial Mexico in the late eighteenth and early nineteenth centuries. One of the first contacts between Germany and Mexico was via the scientific expedition of Prussian aristocrat Alexander von Humboldt, who arrived in Mexico in 1803 and remained for a year mapping Mexican topography, examining its mining sector, and studying its culture and history.

In the 19th century, Mexico had established diplomatic relations with a few German States and as early as 1826, Prussia had established a trade representative in Mexico. In 1833, Mexico assigned an ambassador in Berlin to Prussia. Diplomatic relations between Mexico and a unified Germany were established on 23 January 1879.

During the Second Mexican Empire and the reign of Maximilian I of Mexico, Germans were brought to Mexico to settle in Mexico's southern states, primarily in Yucatán. In 1890, Mexican President Porfirio Díaz and German Chancellor Otto von Bismarck collaborated to bring 450 German families to the Mexican state of Chiapas where they settled in the town of Soconusco to develop the region's agriculture industry. Several German migrants would immigrate to primarily northern Mexico and helped develop several towns such as the port of Mazatlán and Mexico's brewing industry.

=== World War I ===
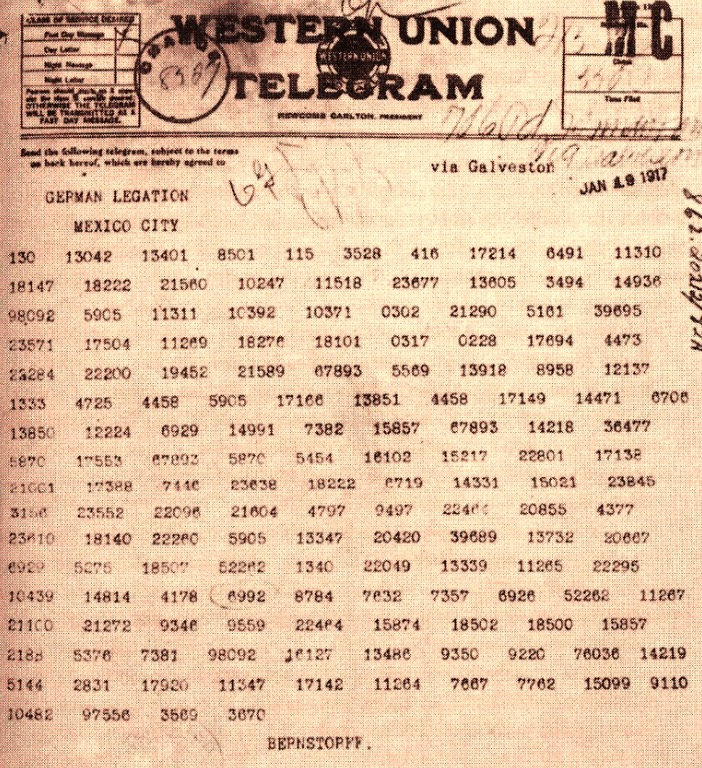
Zimmerman Telegram

During World War I (1914–1918) Mexico remained neutral. During this time, Mexico was preoccupied with its revolution (1910–1920) which took place the same time as World War I. In January 1917, British agents intercepted a telegram sent to German Ambassador to Mexico Heinrich von Eckardt by Arthur Zimmermann, State Secretary for Foreign Affairs of the German Empire. In the telegram, Germany proposed to Mexico that if the United States were to join the war, Mexico should join and side with the Central Powers. In appreciation, and if the Central Powers were to win, Mexico would recuperate the territories of Texas, New Mexico, and Arizona, which Mexico had lost in its war against the United States during the Mexican–American War in 1848. The telegram, known as the Zimmermann Telegram was intercepted when the telegram was being wired to the German embassy in Washington, D.C., to be rerouted to Mexico City. Mexico eventually rejected the telegram and continued to remain neutral during the war. However, this would lead to the American declaration of war against Germany during World War I.

The German Empire had supported the Mexican government to disrupt the exports of American arms. The Germans would also promise Mexico they would send them arms and money if President Huerta would have a war with the United States and would be returned to power. These conspiracies would be found by the United States.

The Ypiranga Incident was an Interception by the United States of a German ship named the SS Ypiranga that was carrying shipments of arms and ammunition that were going to supply the Mexican Government. When the U.S Navy captured it they forced the ship to turn back.

If true or not, the possibility of Germans at the border in Mexico was reasonable enough for a strong U.S. presence on the border of Nogales. There was a report of 2 Germans being killed during the Battle of Ambos Nogales but no evidence or proof is shown.

=== Spanish Civil War ===
During the Spanish Civil War (1936–1939), Mexico and Germany supported opposing sides of the conflict, with Mexico supporting the Republicans and Germany supporting the Nationalists. In addition, Mexico was the only country to protest against Germany’s annexation of Austria at the League of Nations. Such confrontations put Mexico and Germany against each other and caused a largely negative interaction between them.

=== World War II ===
On 22 May 1942, Mexico declared war on Germany during World War II. The decision for war was made by Mexican President Manuel Ávila Camacho after German U-boats had destroyed two Mexican oil tankers in the Gulf of Mexico; the SS Potrero del Llano and SS Faja de Oro, both of which were carrying crude oil to the United States. Mexico is one of only two Latin American nations to contribute soldiers during the war (the other nation being Brazil). Mexican troops fought in the Philippines rather than in Europe.

=== Late 20th century ===
After World War II, Mexico maintained diplomatic relations with both the Federal Republic of Germany (West Germany) and the German Democratic Republic (East Germany). Mexico established an embassy in Berlin for East Germany in 1976 and an embassy in Cologne for West Germany in 1952, before transferring the embassy to Bonn in 1979. In 1963, Mexican President Adolfo López Mateos became the first Mexican head-of-State to visit Germany (West Germany). In 1966, West German President Heinrich Lübke became the first German President to visit Mexico.

After the reunification of Germany in 1990, Mexico established relations with the Federal Republic of Germany and in the year 2000, Mexico moved its embassy to its current location in Berlin.

=== 21st century ===
There have been several high-level visits between leaders of both nations. In June 2017, German Chancellor, Angela Merkel, made an official visit to Mexico, and met with Mexican President Enrique Peña Nieto. Both leaders reaffirmed the strength of the bilateral relationship, which is based on shared values such as democracy and the promotion of free trade. Both nations all focused on the joint collaboration in the defense of multilateralism, cooperation for sustainable development, attention to the migration phenomenon and the fight against climate change, among other issues.

In September 2022, German President Frank-Walter Steinmeier paid a visit to Mexico and met with Mexican President Andrés Manuel López Obrador. During the visit, Steinmeier urged the Mexican government to stand with Europe in opposing the Russian invasion of Ukraine. German President Steinmeier paid a second visit to Mexico in March 2026.

== High-level visits ==
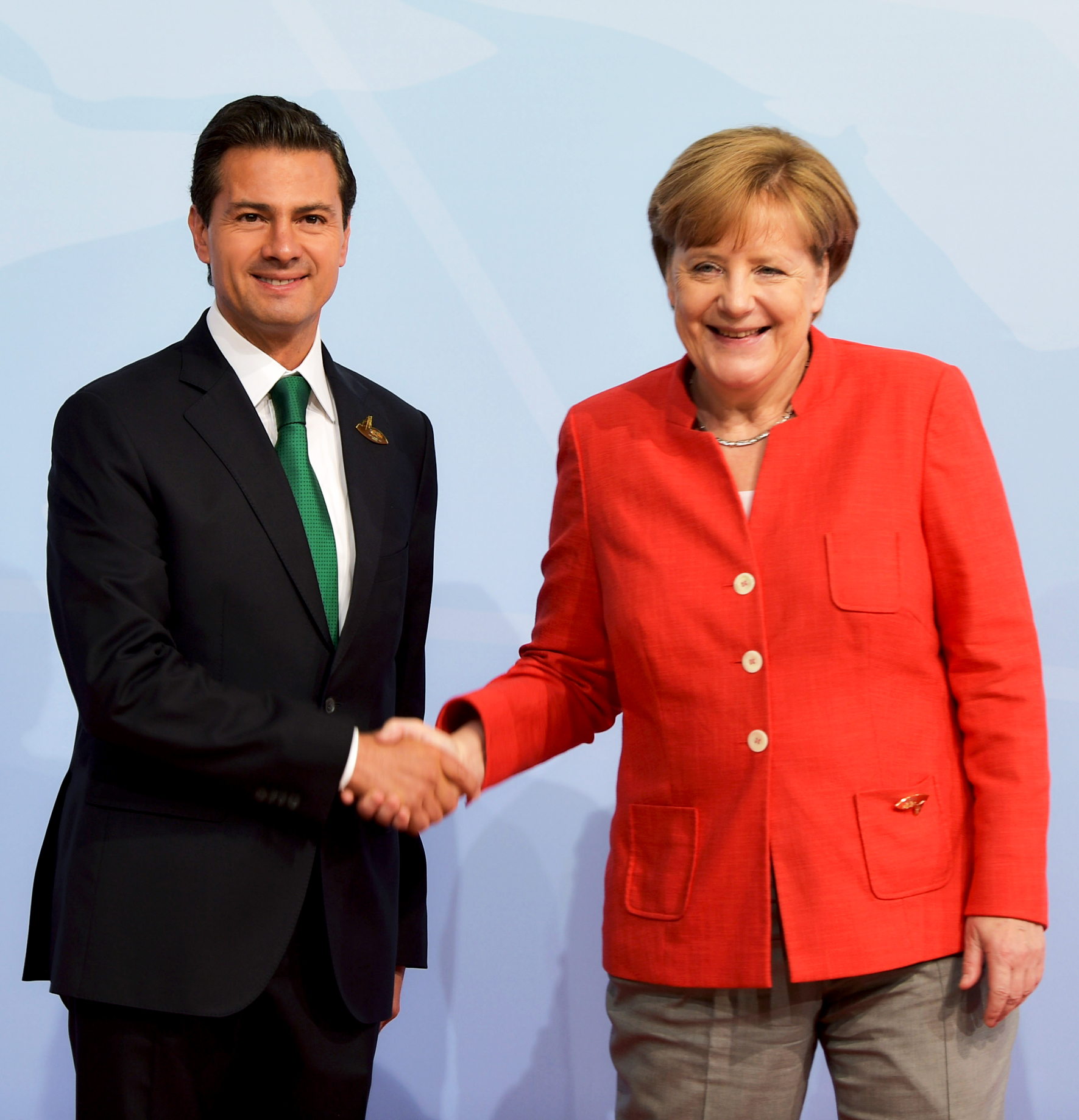
German Chancellor Angela Merkel and Mexican President Enrique Peña Nieto meeting in Hamburg; July 2017.

High-level visits from Germany to Mexico

- President Heinrich Lübke (1966)
- President Walter Scheel (1977)
- Secretary General of East Germany Erich Honecker (1981)
- Chancellor of West Germany and unified Germany Helmut Kohl (1984, 1996)
- President Roman Herzog (1999)
- Chancellor Gerhard Schröder (2002)
- President Johannes Rau (2003)
- President Horst Köhler (2004)
- Chancellor Angela Merkel (2008, 2012, 2017)
- President Christian Wulff (2011)
- President Frank-Walter Steinmeier (2022, 2026)

High-level visits from Mexico to Germany

- President Adolfo López Mateos (1963)
- President Luis Echeverría Álvarez (1974)
- President José López Portillo (1980)
- President Miguel de la Madrid Hurtado (1985)
- President Carlos Salinas de Gortari (1991)
- President Ernesto Zedillo (1997)
- President Vicente Fox (January and October 2001, 2003)
- President Felipe Calderón (January and June 2007, 2010)
- President Enrique Peña Nieto (2016, 2017, 2018)

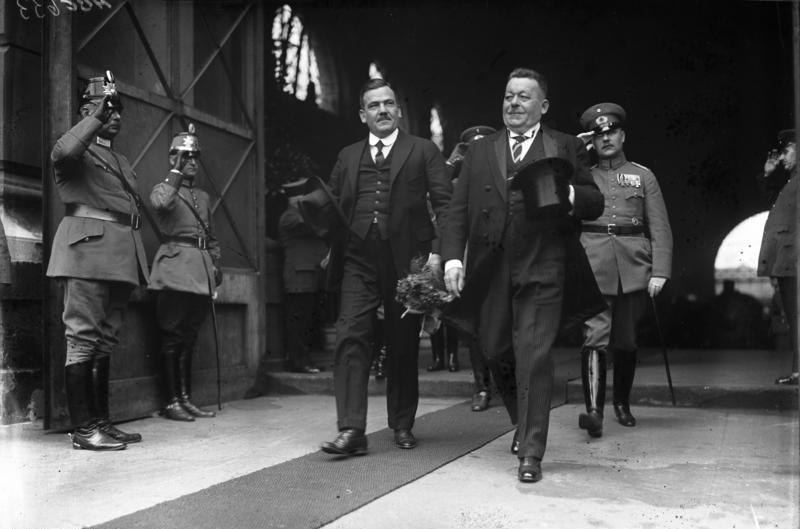
President-elect Plutarco Elías Calles along with President Friedrich Ebert in Berlin; August 1924.

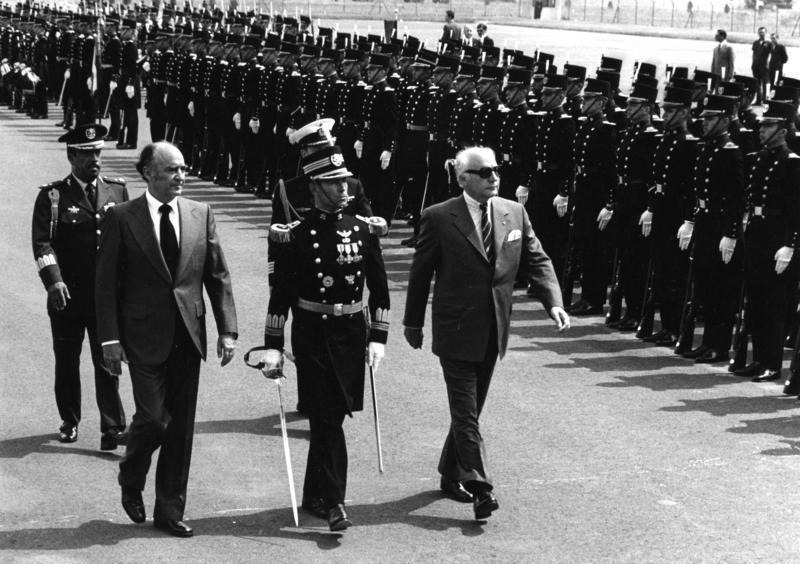
West German President Walter Scheel along with President José López Portillo in Mexico City; 1977.

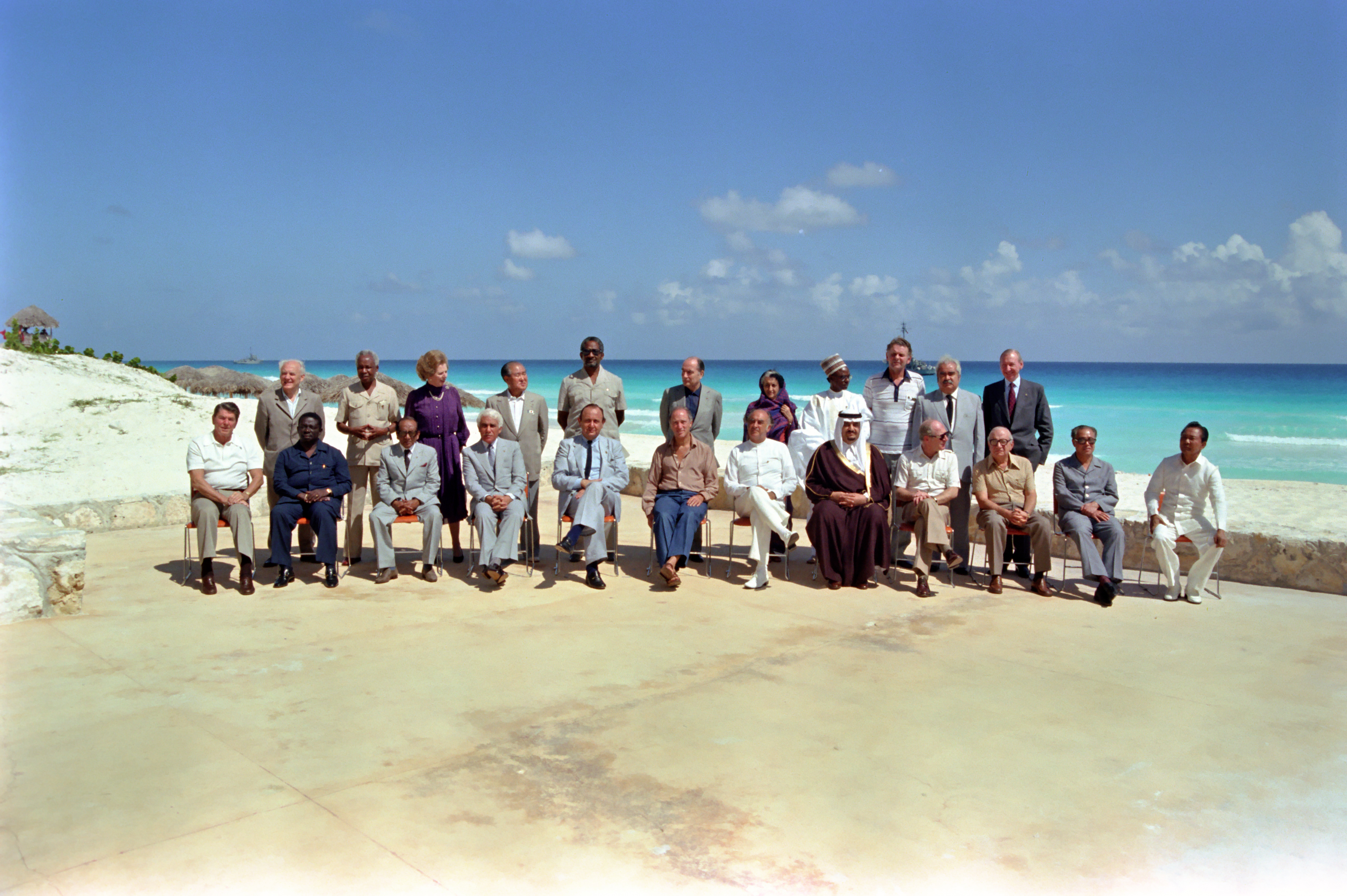
President José López Portillo and West German Foreign Minister Hans-Dietrich Genscher in Cancún; 1981.

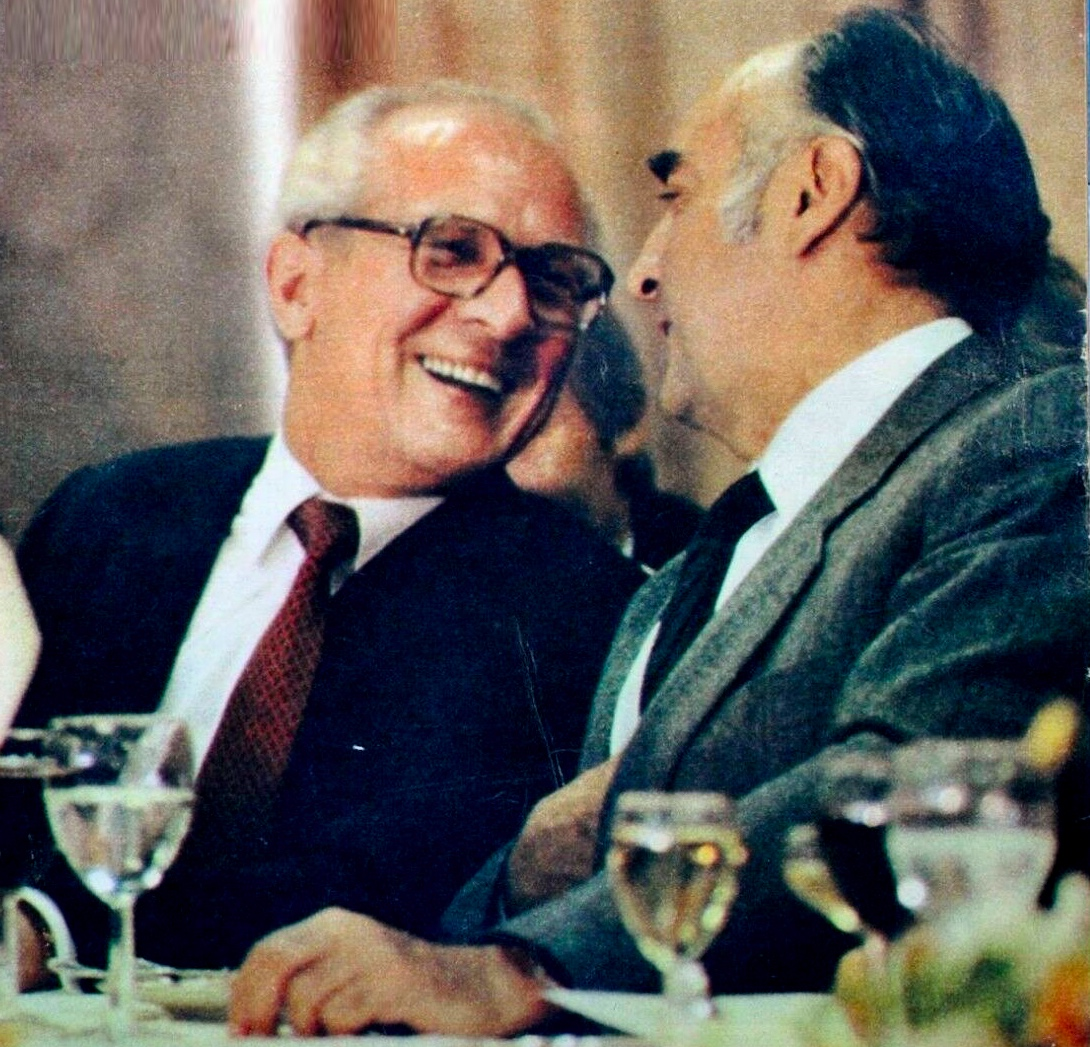
East German General Secretary Erich Honecker with President José López Portillo; 1981.

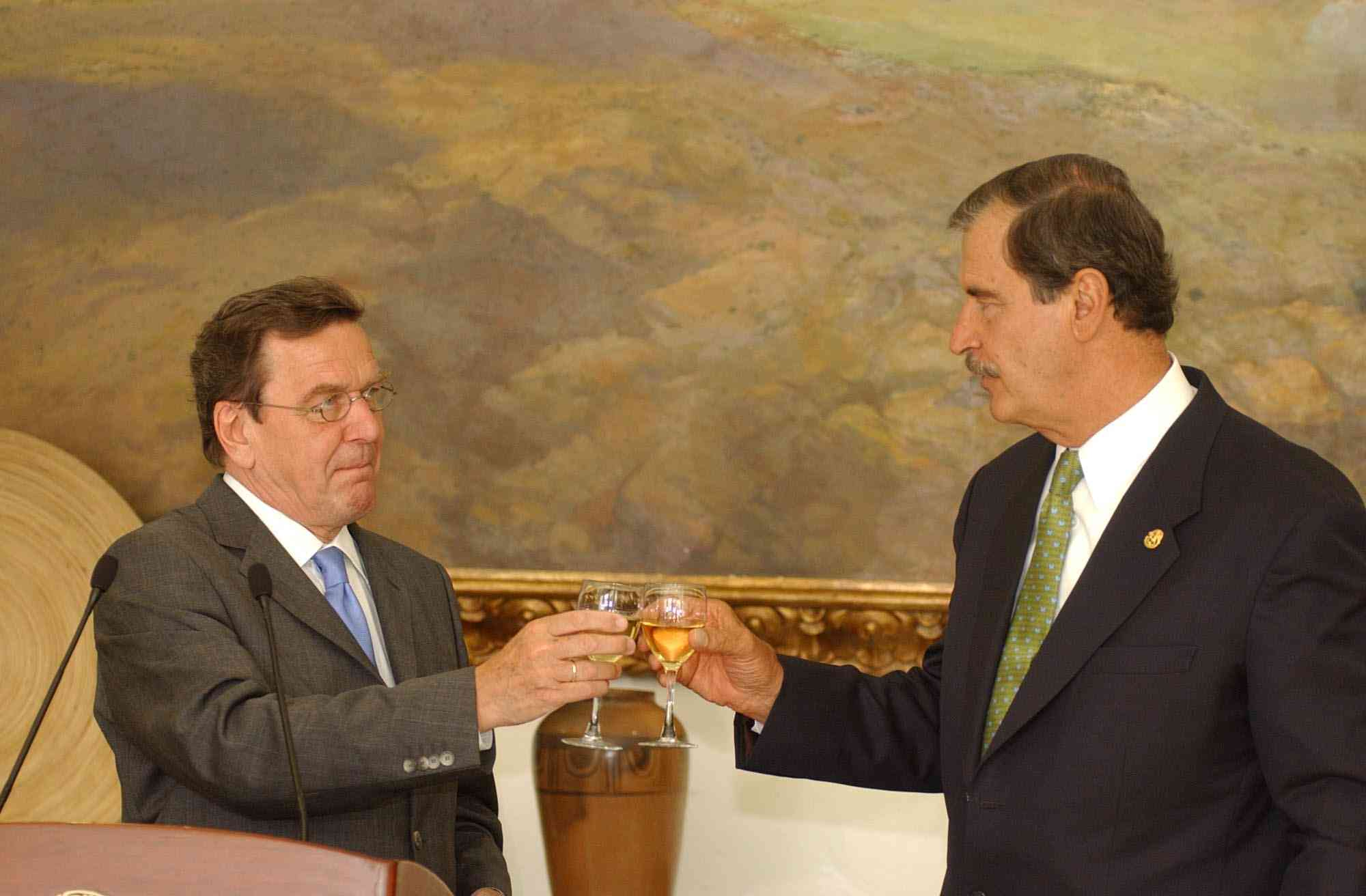
Chancellor Gerhard Schröder and President Vicente Fox in Mexico City; 2002.

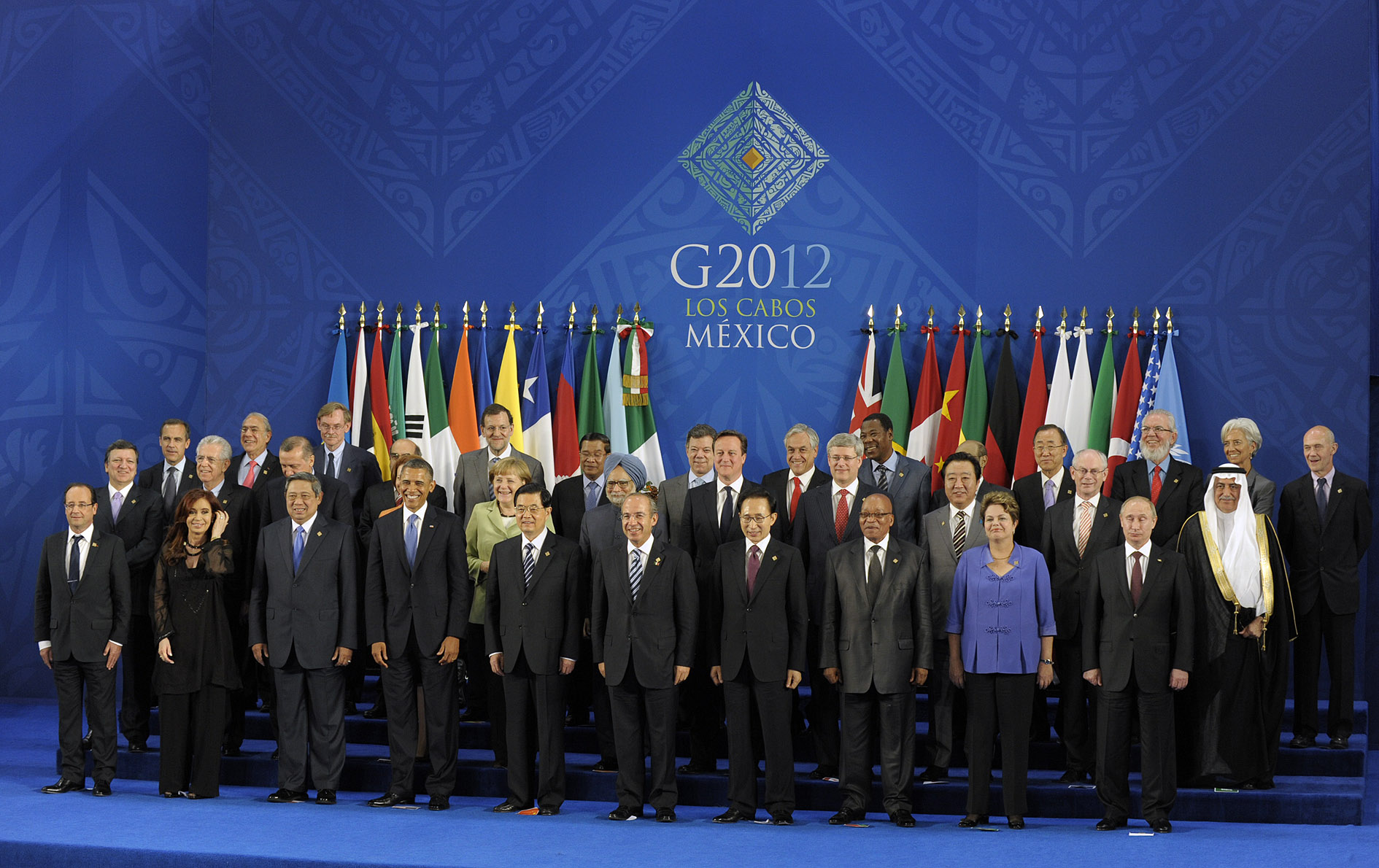
President Felipe Calderón and Chancellor Angela Merkel in Los Cabos; 2012.

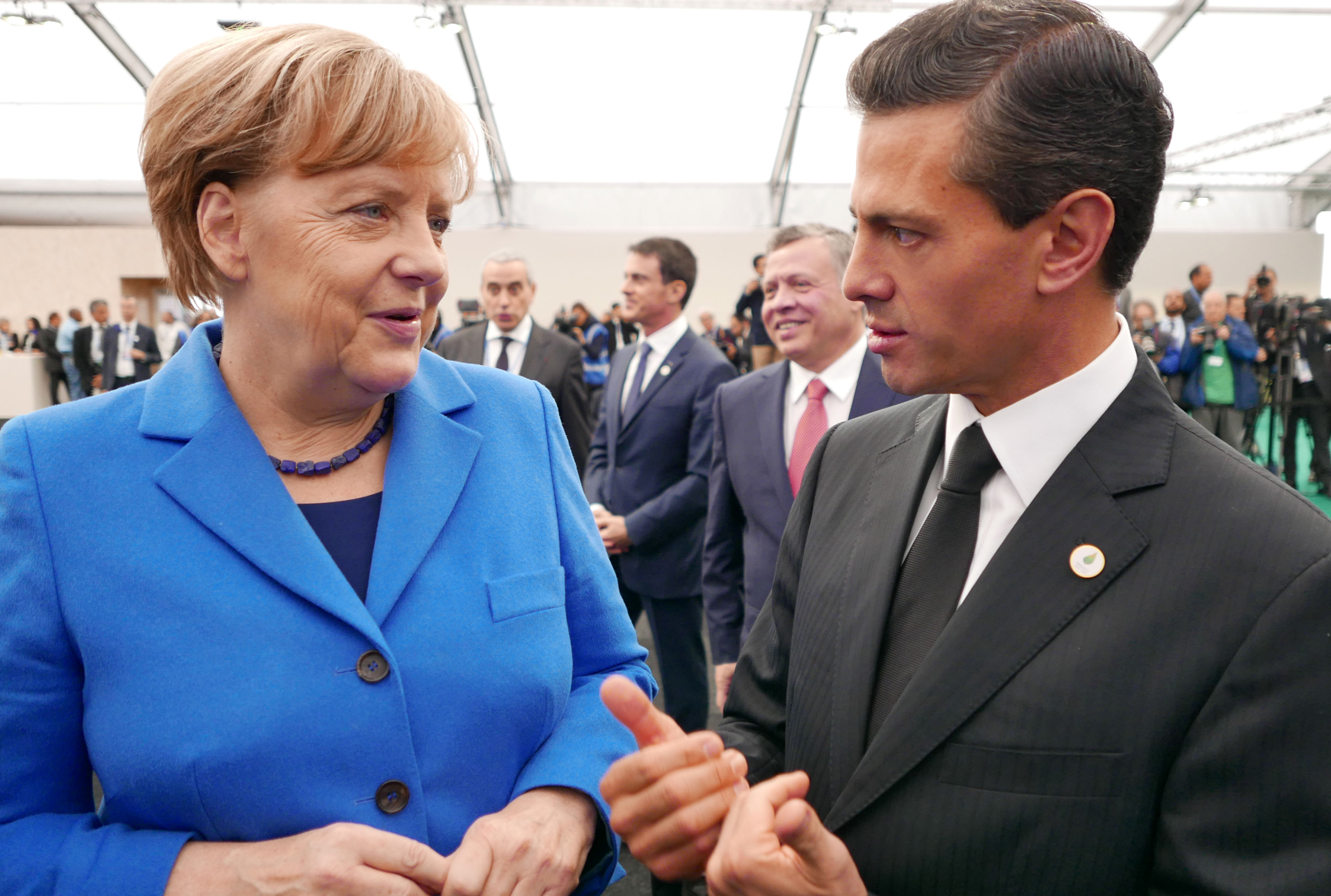
Chancellor Angela Merkel and President Enrique Peña Nieto in Paris; 2015.

== Bilateral agreements ==
Both nations have signed several bilateral agreement such as an Agreement for the Protection of the Rights of Author of Musical Works (1954); Agreement on Reciprocity in Legal Aid (1956); Agreement of Air Transportation (1967); Agreement of Scientific and Technological Cooperation (1974); Agreement of Cultural Cooperation (1977); Agreement of Cooperation between both nations governments (1996); Agreement in Technical Cooperation (1997); Agreement on the Promotion and Reciprocal Protection of Investments (1998) and an Agreement to Avoid Double Taxation and Tax Evasion in the Matter of Income and Wealth Taxes (2008).

== Migration ==
There is a sizable German origin community in Mexico that thrives and several prominent Mexican politicians, journalists, artists and actors are of German descent. There is also a Mennonite community in Mexico with approximately 100,000 members of predominantly German origin. Currently it is estimated that there are 1,200,000 Mexicans with partial German ancestry, mostly concentrated in the north of the country.

== Transportation ==
There are direct flights between both nations with the following airlines: Condor, Discover Airlines and Lufthansa.

== Trade relations ==
In 1997, Mexico signed a Free Trade Agreement with the European Union (which includes Germany). In 2023, two-trade between both nations amounted to US$26.7 billion Germany is Mexico's biggest trading partner within the European Union and fifth biggest globally. At the same time, Mexico is Germany's second biggest trading partner in Latin America (after Brazil). Germany's main exports to Mexico include: machinery, automobiles, chemical based products, pharmaceutical products and medical technology. Mexico's main exports to Germany include: automobiles and automotive parts, as well as products from the electronics industry.

There are over 1,300 German companies based in Mexico. Several German multinational companies invest and operate in Mexico such as Audi, Bayer, BMW, Deutsche Bank, Mercedes-Benz, Siemens and Volkswagen (among others). Mexican multinational companies such as Cemex, Grupo Alfa, Nemak and Orbia (among others) operate in Germany.

== Resident diplomatic missions ==
- Germany has an embassy in Mexico City.
- Mexico has an embassy in Berlin and a consulate in Frankfurt.

Embassy of Germany in Mexico City

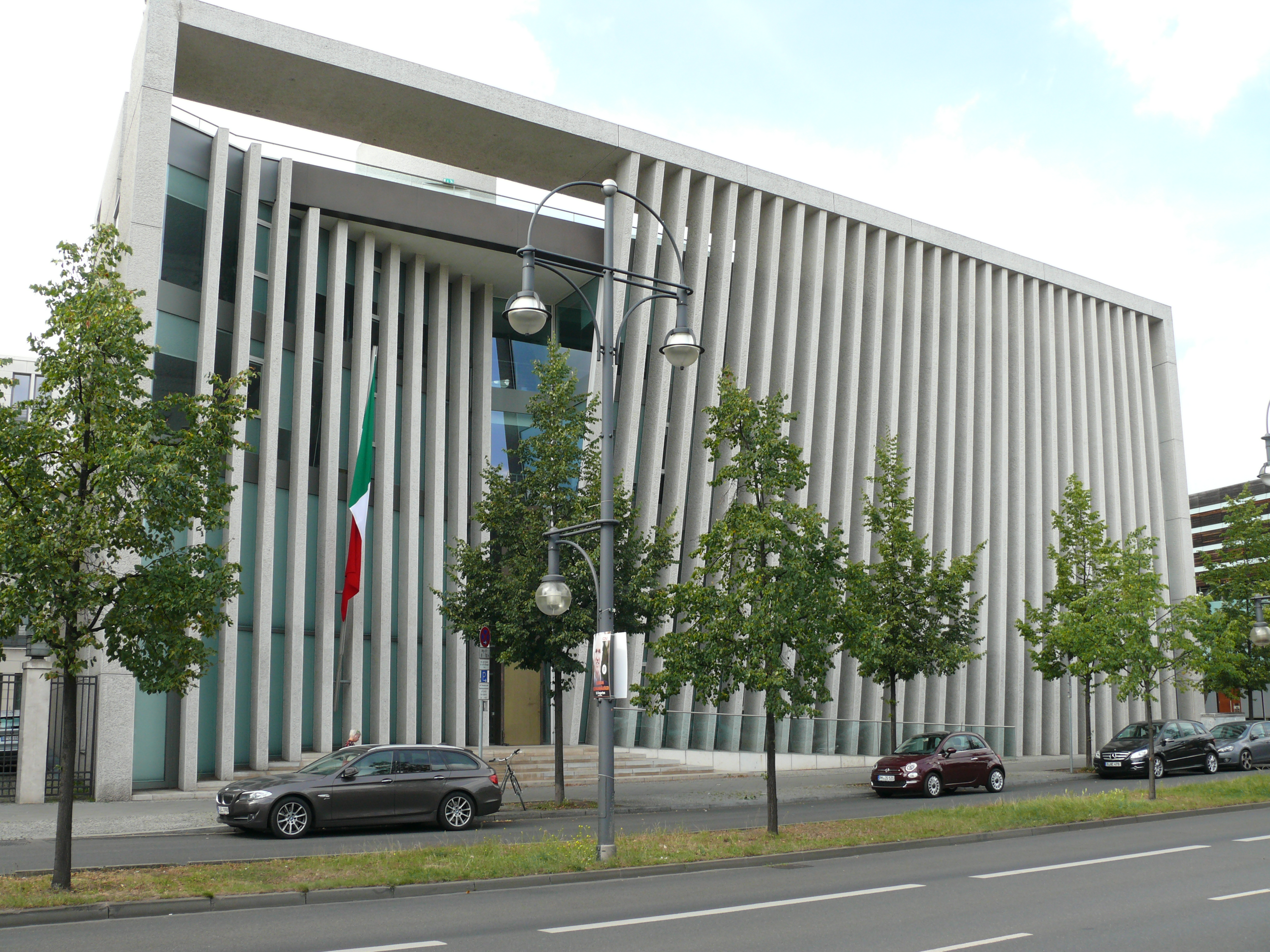
Embassy of Mexico in Berlin

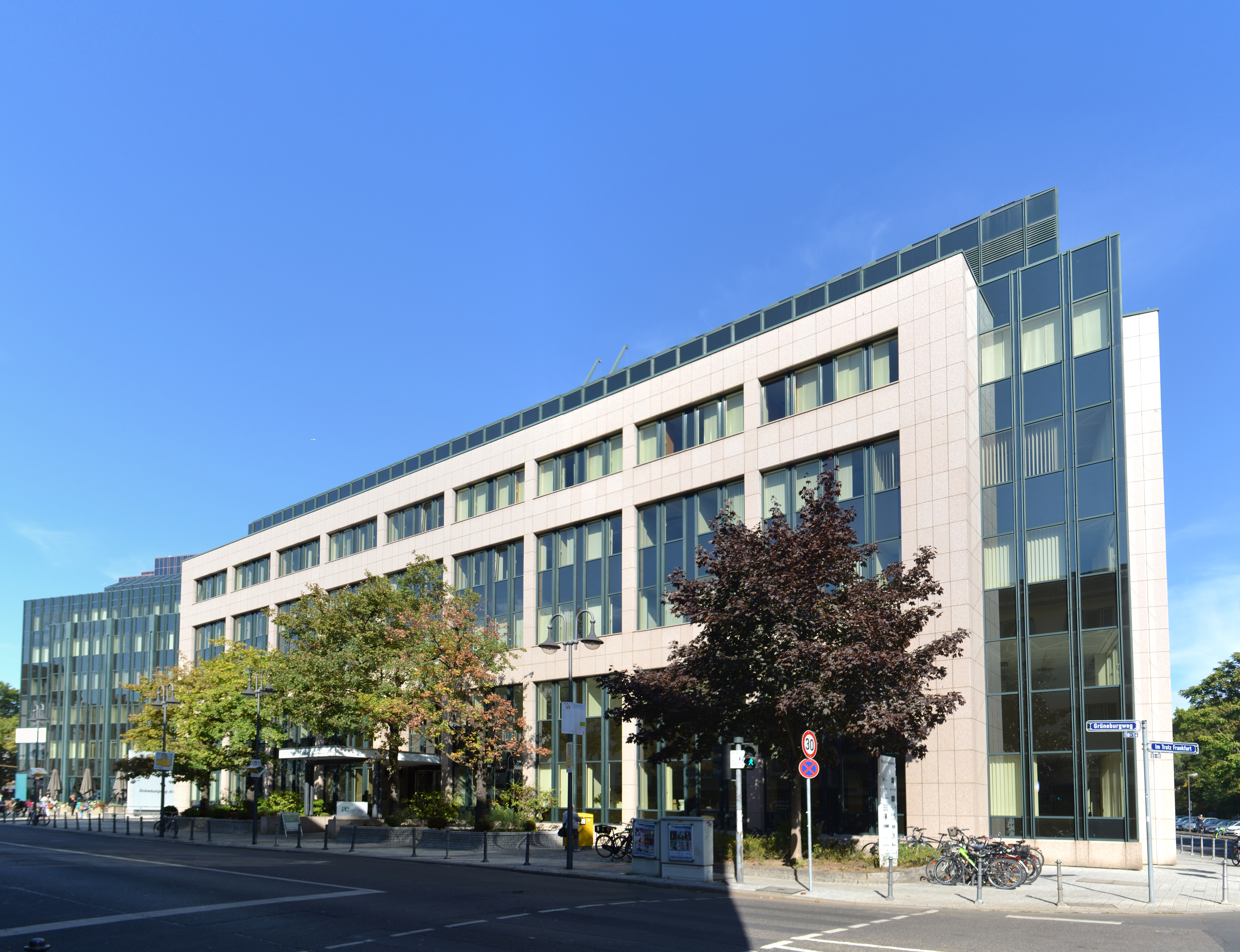
Building hosting the Consulate of Mexico in Frankfurt

== Gallery ==
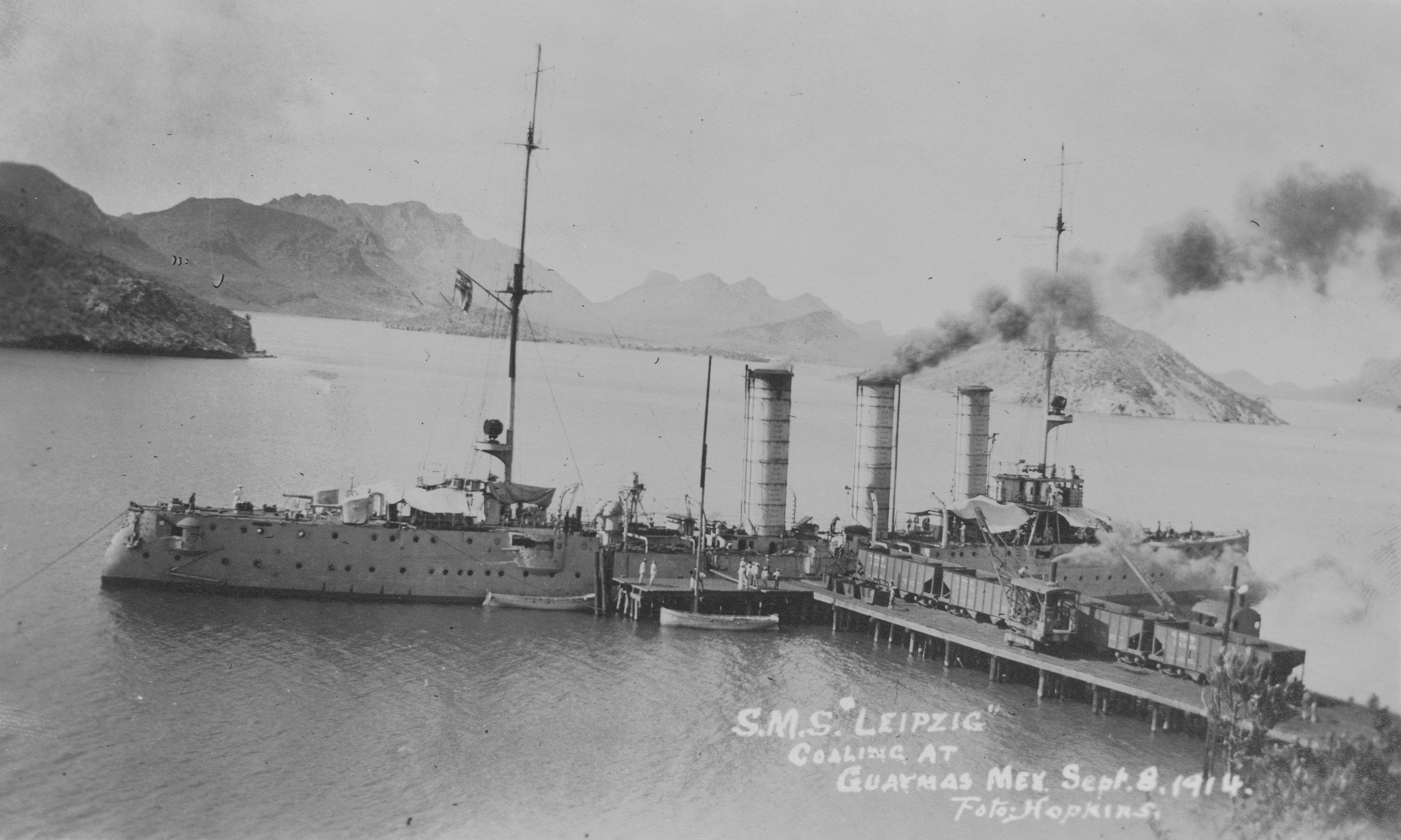
German Navy cruiser, SMS Leipzig, at the Mexican port of Guaymas

Statue of Alexander von Humboldt in Mexico City

Mexican Naval training vessel, the ARM Cuauhtémoc, in Hamburg

== See also ==
- German Mexicans
- Mexicans in Germany
