= Mexican immigration to Spain =

Mexicans in Spain Mexicanos en España
Total population
- 87.575 (2025) (Note: 48.025 is the size of the population in Spain born in Mexico (including those with Spanish citizenship). 39.550 is the size of the foreign population (thus, with no Spanish citizenship) in Spain with Mexican citizenship.)

Regions with significant populations
- Madrid, Catalonia, Andalusia and Asturias

Languages
- Spanish

Religion
- Roman Catholicism

Related ethnic groups
- White Mexicans, Amerindian Mexicans, Mestizo Mexicans, Black Mexicans

Mexicans living in Spain are composed primarily of students, skilled professionals, spouses of Spaniards, as well as Mexican citizens who also have Spanish nationality. In January 2025, the National Statistics Institute in Spain had 87.575. registered Mexicans within its territory. Out of these, 48.025 were Spanish citizens and 39.550 had not yet acquired Spanish citizenship. Mexican and Spanish laws allow dual citizenship, and many Mexicans who have asked for it, whether they are residents in Spain as grandchildren or they are children of Spanish migrants to Mexico. In 2010, the Ministry of Foreign Affairs of Mexico recorded 21,107 Mexicans living in Spain, who became the third largest Mexican community residing abroad, after the United States and Canada; and the largest Mexican community in Europe.

The main destinations of the Mexican community according to the INE, are the autonomous communities of Madrid with 4,138; Catalonia with 4,482 and Andalusia with 2,822. Of the Mexican migrants living in Spain, 61% are women, mainly from the Mexican states of Jalisco, Nuevo León, Veracruz, Baja California, Hidalgo, Puebla, Querétaro, Sinaloa, Yucatán, Chihuahua and Chiapas. The typical profile of the Mexican immigrant is a middle-aged individual from the upper-middle class, concentrated in Madrid, Barcelona, and Seville. There are many examples of graduate students who have built working relationships and emotional ties that lead to them remaining in Spain.

Spain has always been the European country where the majority of Mexican emigrants to Europe go to, but since 2012, Mexican citizens are migrating more to other European countries, such as Germany, Switzerland, France, the Netherlands, Italy and the United Kingdom, following the economic crisis that Spain has undergone in recent years.

== History ==
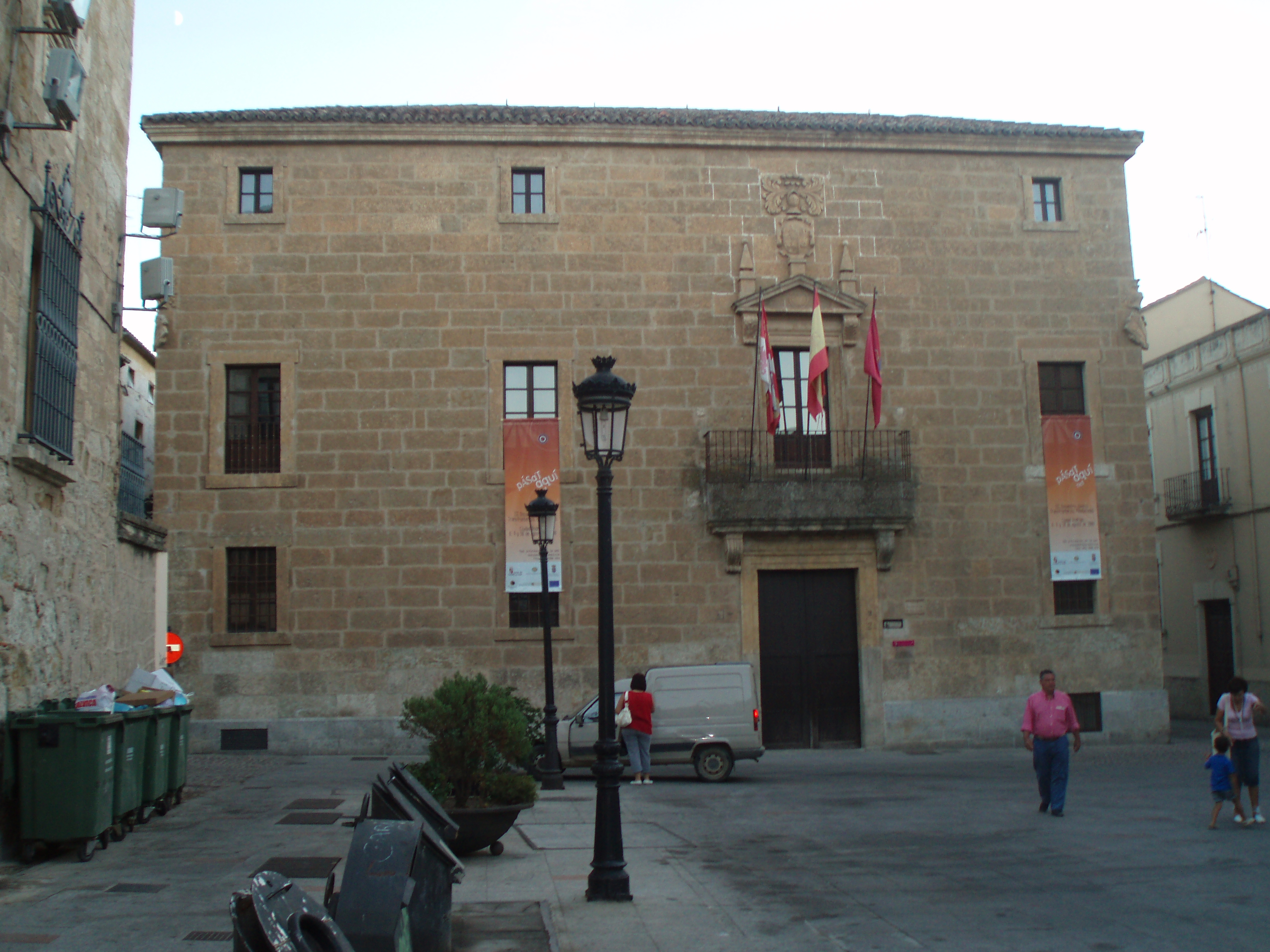
The palace of Moctezuma in Ciudad Rodrigo, one of the palaces of Spanish descendants of the Aztec emperor Moctezuma II.

After Spain completed the conquest of Mexico-Tenochtitlan, the first marriages between the daughters of the Emperor Moctezuma Ilhuilcamina and the Spanish soldiers of Extremadura were carried out.

The first Spanish-born Mexicans to arrive on their native soil were the children of soldiers in Hernán Cortés's army who returned to Seville and Extremadura and the descendants of Aztec royalty which included the titled Duke of Moctezuma de Tultengo and in Granada, the Counts of Miravalle.

At the end of the sixteenth century, after Mariana de Carvajal married Juan de Toledo Toledo-Moctezuma, who was a descendant of Juan Cano de Saavedra and Isabel Moctezuma, daughter of the Aztec emperor Moctezuma II, who built his palace in Cáceres with a coats of arms incorporating those of the families of Toledo Carvajal as well as Moctezuma.

During the early twentieth century, there was already a permanent Mexican community in Spain, many of whom were exiled during the Mexican Revolution. Some Porfirian families chose to be exiled rather than continue to live under the new government.

At the beginning of Spanish Civil War, many Mexicans were part of the armed movements in the territory of Spain, supporting the Republican fighters.

In the twentieth century, the causes of migration are different, mainly marital links with citizens of Spain, student exchanges or university graduate, which the labor supply and naturalization arises; and the existing economic dynamism between Mexico and Spain, thus achieving the establishment of numerous Mexican companies in the Iberian peninsula.

In 2015, a legislation conferring Sephardic Jews the right to get Spanish citizenship under the right of return principle was approved in Spain; within a year 88 Mexican Jews were granted Spanish nationality.

== Mexican culture in Spain ==
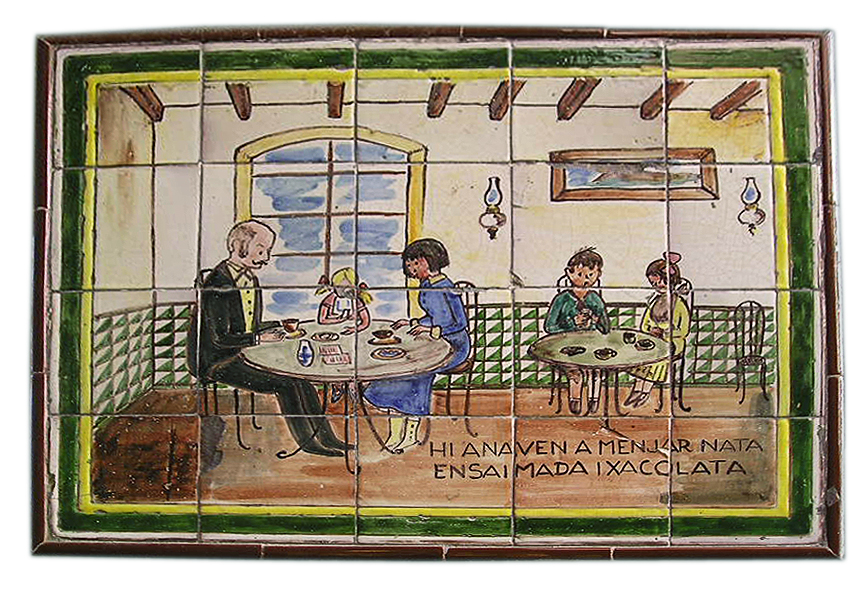
Chocolate in Barcelona.

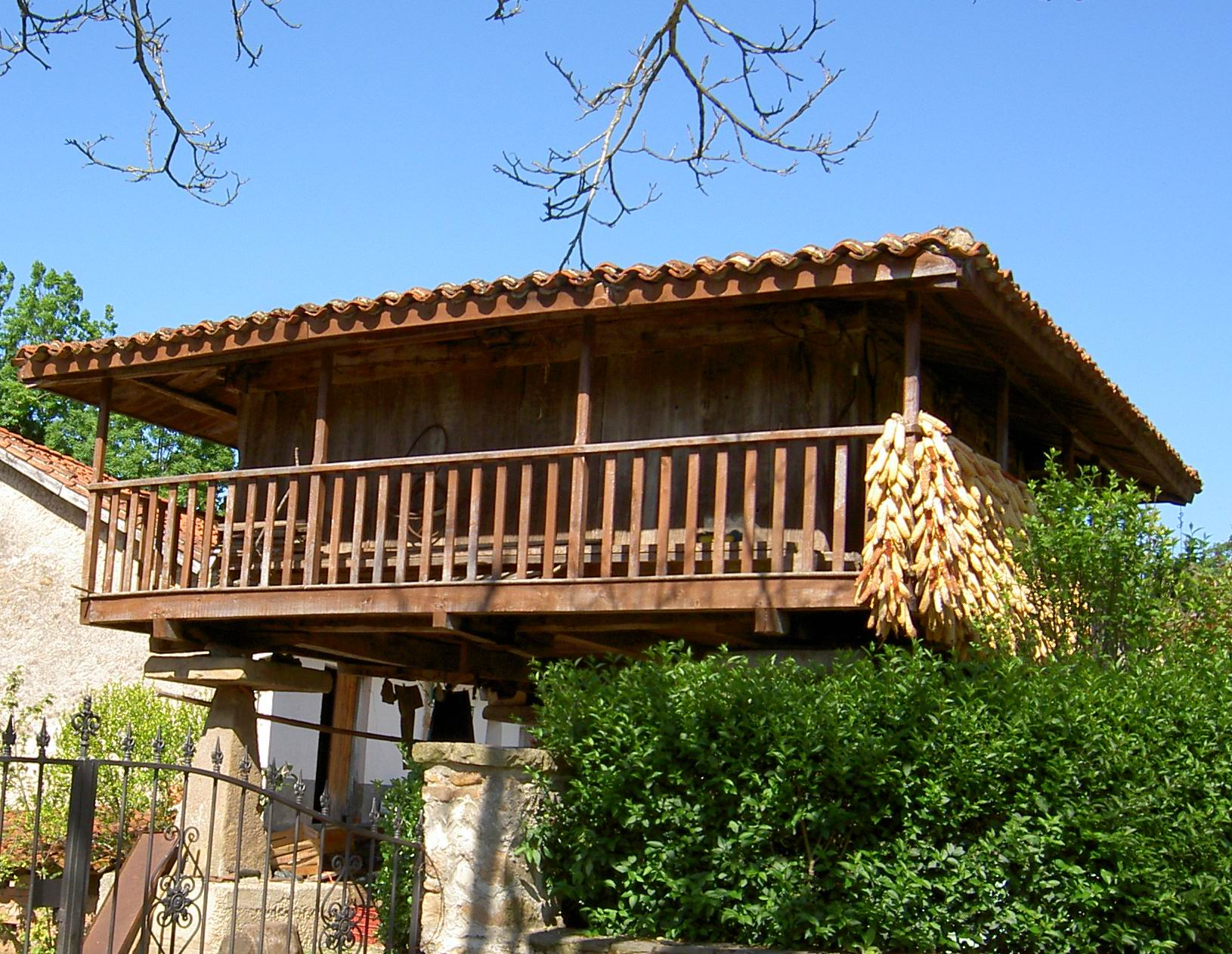
The culture of maize manifests itself mainly in northern Spain.

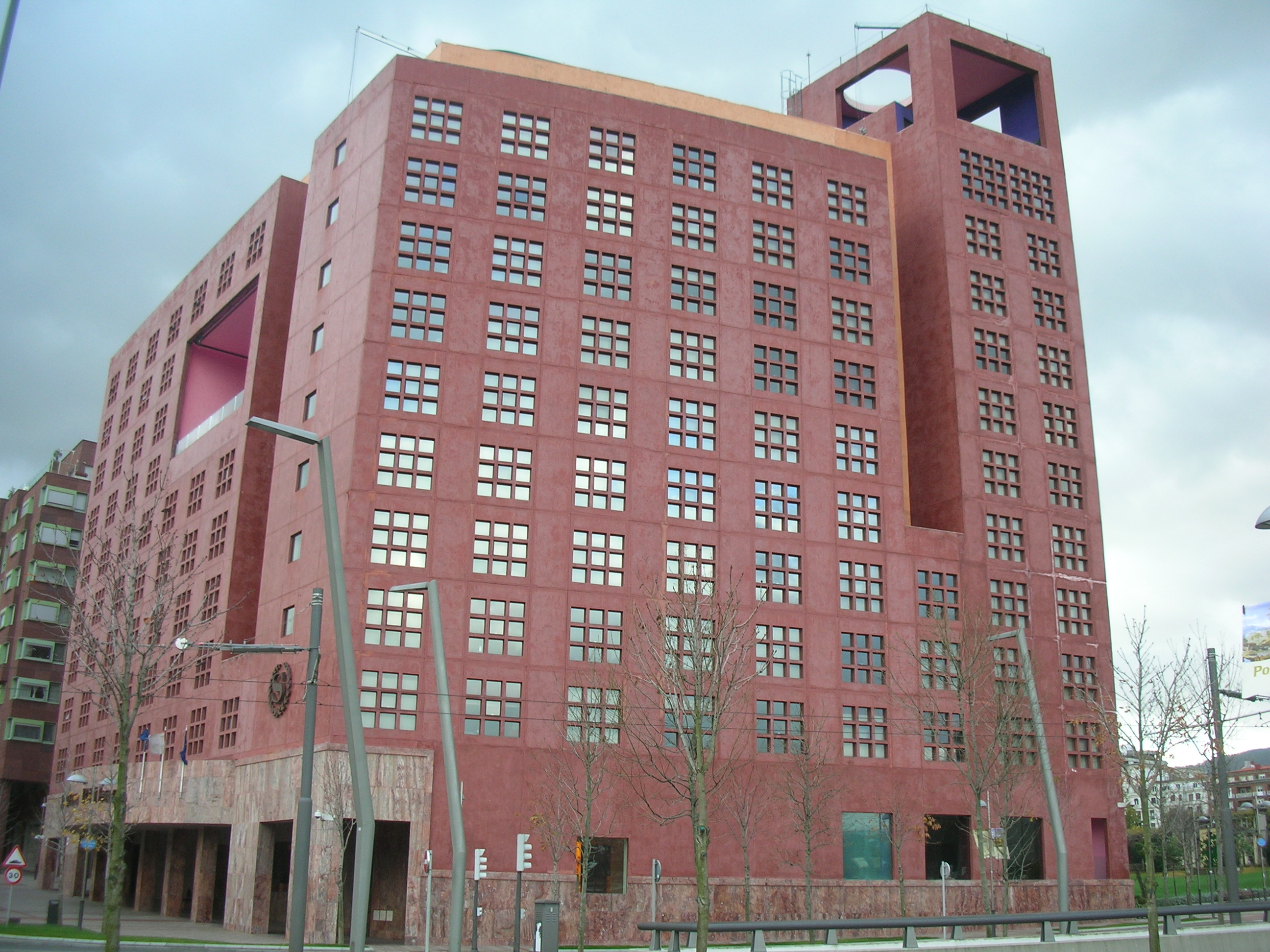
Hotel Sheraton Bilbao was influenced by contemporary Mexican architecture.

As for concerning Spanish cuisine, the influence of Hispanic flavors in the kitchen is very marked in the rest of Hispanic America and the Philippines. The Spanish kitchen also was enriched with Mexican products such as tomatoes, maize, avocado, vanilla and fine chocolate, which was Mesoamerican origin.

Ranchera and mariachi music are well appreciated and disseminated within the Spanish society. There are important interpreters of music that express the different rhythms and lyrics of Mexican singer-songwriters or composers. Rocío Dúrcal is an icon that has been well identified with the ranchera genres.

Mexican architecture in Spain is mainly expressed by the modern movement and the colors of the walls used by Luis Barragán and Ricardo Legorreta, Mexican architects have built several buildings with a clear stylistic formality. Sheraton Bilbao and Housing Parque Europa in Madrid hotel are constructions with shapes and styles of contemporary Mexican architecture.

== Mexican communities ==
Spain is the third country where Mexicans immigrate to. It is noteworthy that there is no relationship with the Mexican immigration to the United States or to Canada. Mexicans who immigrate to Spain or the rest of the European continent are primarily middle or high class and do not work in manual labor; rather they are recruited from Mexico to operate in any Mexican or Spanish company, of which many of them occupy important positions.

Many Mexicans abroad are by business or labor issues that were brought by major Mexican business groups who settled in this country such as Grupo Bimbo, Cemex, Aceros de Monterrey, Jumex, Farmacias Similares, among others. Mexican companies have found an important development among Spanish consumers by the similar way that the Mexican entrepreneurs do business in connection with Americans.

== Social status ==
While approximately 1,000 Mexicans enter Spain each year as temporary students or construction contract workers, they are not counted as immigrants because of their explicitly temporary legal status.

== Other factors ==
The illegal drug trade is the reason the Spanish prison system has a presence of approximately 10,000 Hispanic American citizens, of whom 393 are Mexican men and women between 25 and 50 years of age serving sentences of up to nine years in prison, while in 1990 there were 6 and 37 in 2000 Mexican prisoners. After the United States, the Foreign Ministry has in its Mexican embassy in Madrid the second busiest processes related to drug trafficking.

== Mexican diplomatic consular offices in Spain ==
- Embassy of Mexico in Madrid
- Consulate in Barcelona, Catalonia
- Honorary consulate in Gijón, Asturias
- Honorary consulate in Murcia, Region of Murcia
- Honorary consulate in Palma de Mallorca, Balearic Islands
- Honorary consulate in Santa Cruz de Tenerife, Canary Islands
- Honorary consulate in Seville, Andalusia
- Honorary consulate in Valencia, Valencian Community
- Honorary consulate in Zaragoza, Aragon
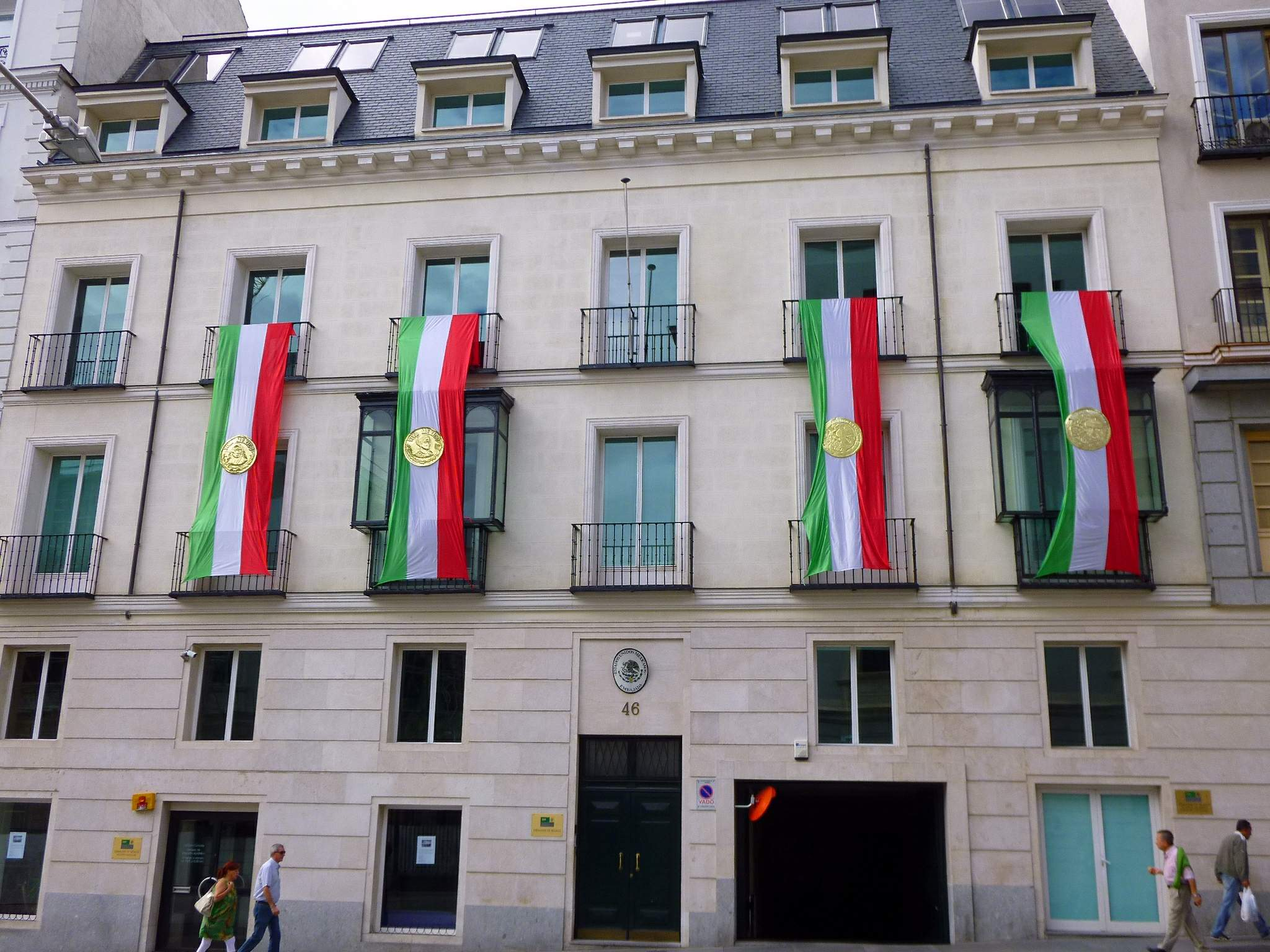
Embassy of Mexico in Madrid

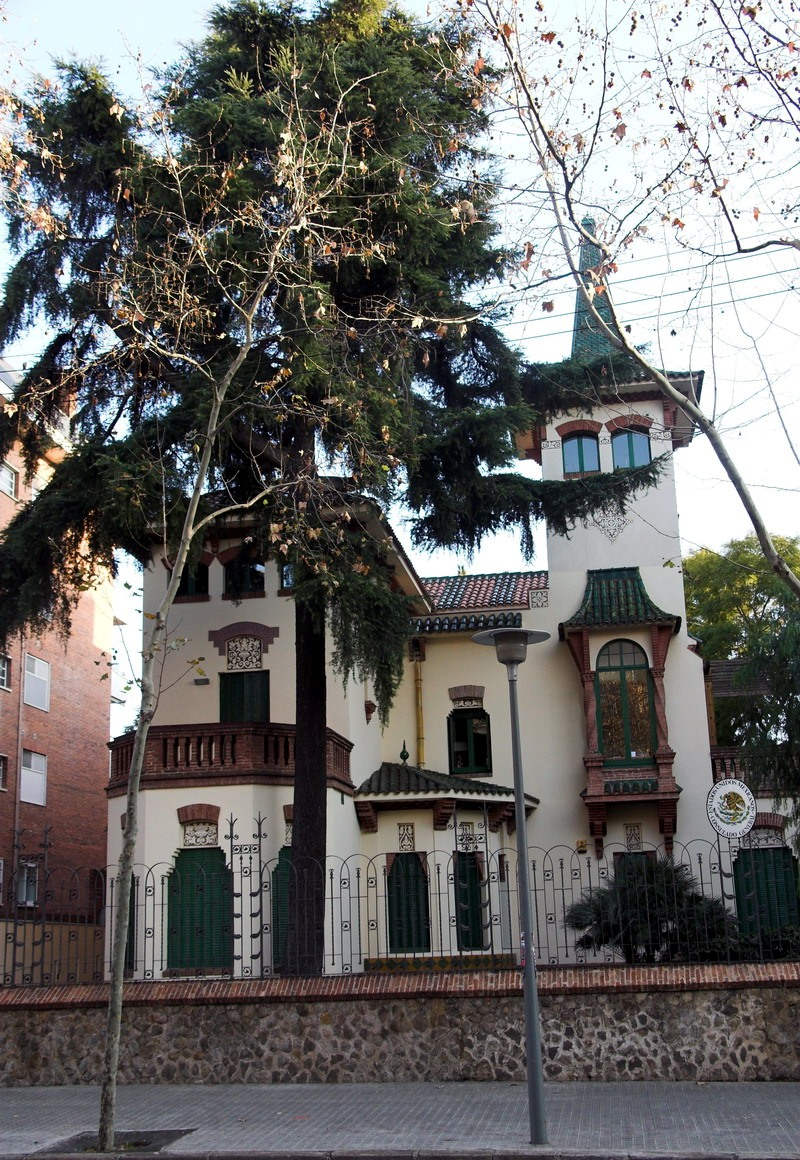
Consulate of Mexico in Barcelona

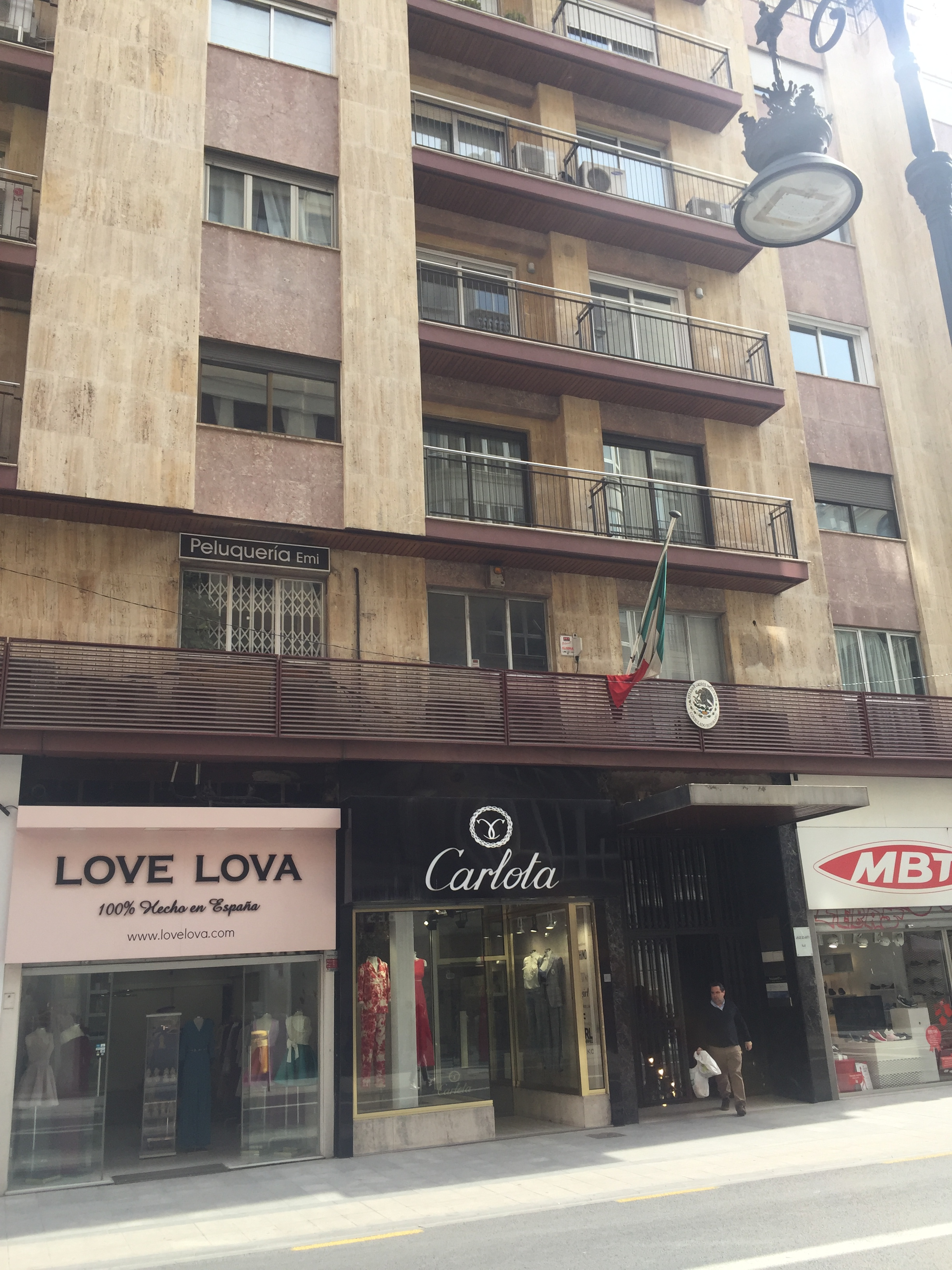
Honorary consulate of Mexico in Valencia

== Statistics ==
Year of census	Mexican residents
2008	14,399
2009	16,482 ▲
2010	21,107 ▲
2012	16,864 ▼
2020	61,194 ▲

== Notable Mexican residents in Spain ==
- Juan Ruiz de Alarcón, Novohispanic poet.
- Alaska, singer.
- Mark Consuelos, actor.
- Eduardo Noriega, actor

== See also ==
- Spanish immigration to Mexico
- Mexico–Spain relations
- Immigration to Spain
- Mexican diaspora
