= Mexicans in Germany =

Mexican population of Germany

Mexicans in Germany Mexicanos en Alemania Mexikaner in Deutschland
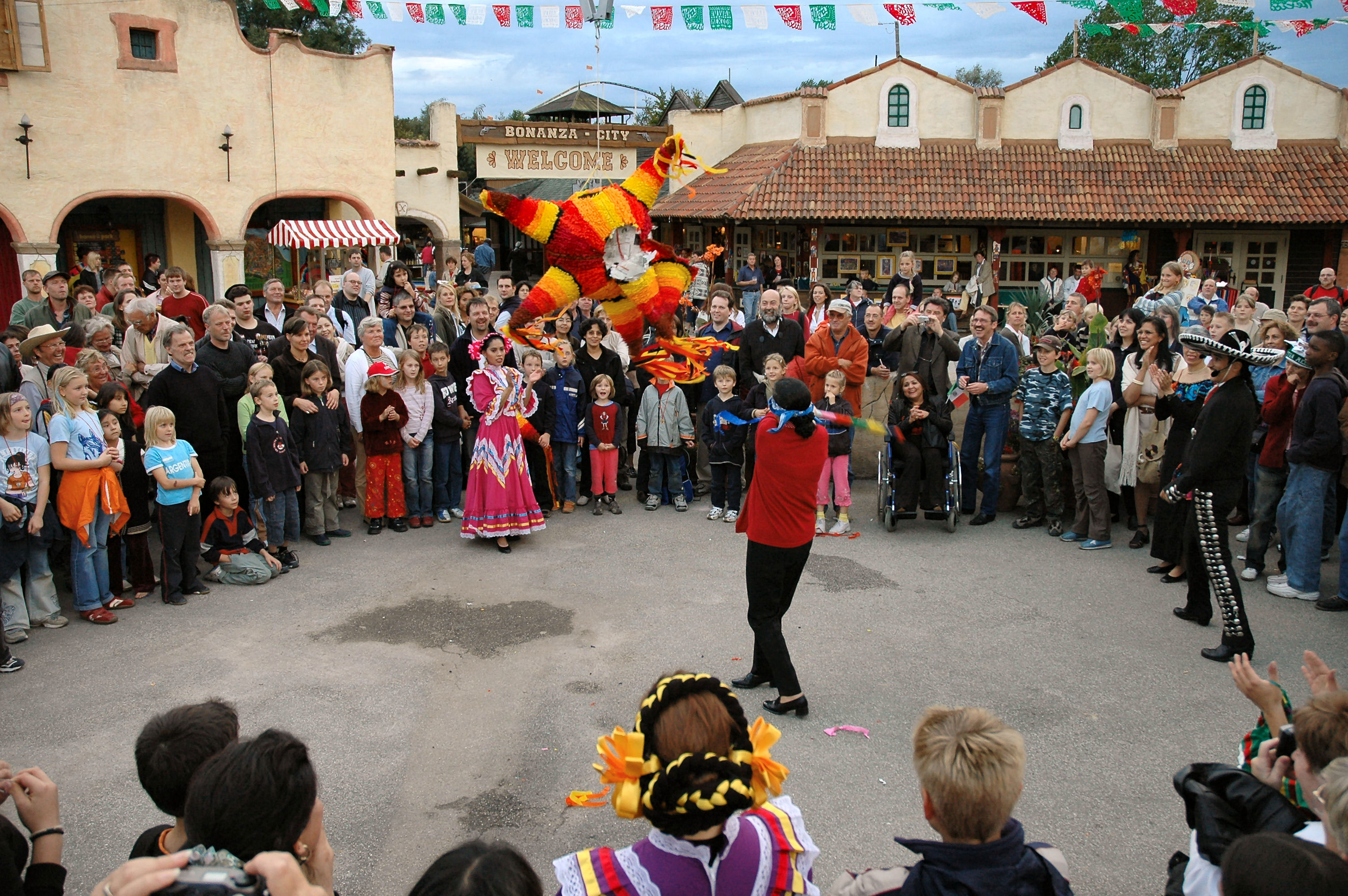
- Mexican party in Schleswig-Holstein, Germany.

Total population
- 17,755

Regions with significant populations
- Berlin, Bavaria, North Rhine-Westphalia, Baden-Württemberg, Frankfurt

Languages
- Spanish (Mexican Spanish), German

Religion
- Roman Catholicism and Protestantism

Related ethnic groups
- White Mexicans, Amerindian Mexicans, mestizo Mexicans

Mexicans in Germany refers to the Mexican population in Germany and their German-born descendants.

== Overview ==
Number of Mexican citizens in districts of Germany in 2021

According to the Federal Statistical Office of Germany, the Mexican population is concentrated mostly in the federal states of Bavaria, Baden-Württemberg, both in southern Germany and Berlin. Substantial populations also exist in Lower Saxony and Rhineland in northwestern Germany, which is the fourth largest community of Mexicans abroad; and the second in Europe after Spain. There are currently 16 registered Mexican-German companies. Among the main activities include the realization of socio-cultural, some in coordination with embassy events, which highlight the history, lifestyle and traditions of Mexican culture and arousing interest in German public for Mexico. Mexican associations are staunch allies in case of emergency actions as natural meteors that happen in Mexico, and one of them, the Mexican-German Society AC (Deutsch-Gesellschaft eV Mexikanische), which brings together a select group of industrialists and businessmen Germans, supports various infrastructure projects, education and indigenous communities.

The unemployment that has affected the upper middle class of Mexico and the pursuit of professional development of young Mexican graduates of public and private universities has made Germany a preferred destination for Mexican immigrants, with the Mexican community having most have grown in recent years compared to other Hispanic American communities who have had a strong presence in this country (such as Cuba, Chile and Colombia). In 2014, the Mexican population is estimated to be from 12,000 to 15,000 people, mostly between 20–40 years of age and upper middle-class or upper-class; work and educational opportunities are not the only main attraction, also mobility to other countries in the European Union, the marital bonds and bi-national efforts between Mexico and the European Union has benefited the descendants of Germans and other European countries born in Mexico.

The economic crisis in Spain has made Mexicans move to Germany, which is getting Mexican transmigrants, who had arrived in other European countries, but that the economic and political difficulties in them is forcing them to emigrate again without the possibility to return to Mexico. The European Union has noted that Mexicans based on the continent have only changed their residence to countries such as Germany, Switzerland, Poland, Sweden and Norway and the United Kingdom, of which Germany is where most displaced Mexicans are concentrating.

== History ==
The first Mexicans who arrived in what would be known as years later as the Federal Republic of Germany were among exiled government supporters of Porfirio Díaz, for the revolutionary movement reached the port of Bremerhaven in 1911; but had to migrate to other countries due to the war events of World War II.

Mexicans who had migrated to Europe as a result of the Mexican Revolution, the beginning of the war events that arose in the countries of Central Europe forced them to migrate to other European countries, such as Spain and Switzerland, which were neutral. In the concentration camps in Germany alone it has been recorded that five Mexicans were interned during World War II. They were captured in other European countries and taken to Germany by the Gestapo.

After the unification of Germany, an exodus of Mexican intellectuals and students arrived, which took the educational and labor supply. Most of the Hispanic American presence in the country are in descending order: Colombian, Cuban and Mexican immigrants.

The Mexican migrant population in Germany compose mainly young people between 20 and 35 years of both sexes have high educational levels. Unlike emigration to the United States are mainly distributed in large metropolitan cities, their jobs vary from 1–4-year tenure, many Mexicans are part of the bodies of work and research laboratories, universities and industrial workshops. Some women find work in the care of children and elderly are the other main sector marital bonds that have recently emerged between people from Germany and Mexico, which have been increasing the generation of German children with a parent in Hispanic America.

== Mexican communities in Germany ==
Germany is a recipient nation for Mexican transmigrants, and it is final destination in most things because of the economic and employment stability that Germany presents compared to other European countries. Some of these Mexican transmigrants had already arrived to other European countries, but the difficulties prompted them to move to Germany or Switzerland without leaving Europe.

=== Mexicans in Berlin ===
The largest Mexican community in Germany lives in Berlin and its surrounding metropolitan area. Mexicans are mainly professionals, academics, researchers, entrepreneurs and enterprising youth who have come to try their luck.

=== Mexicans in Bavaria ===
Bavaria has one of the largest Mexican communities in the country. There are many reasons why Mexicans have chosen the Bavarian cities as a destination, such as its proximity to many European countries, unlike the mild climate of northern Germany; the widely professed Catholicism in the south; the roots from relatives of Bavarian migrants to Mexico, job opportunities, the coexistence and integration of many nationalities, air links with Mexico, labor and educational exchanges and the assimilation of Mexican and Hispanic American culture.

== Diplomatic relations of Mexico in Germany ==
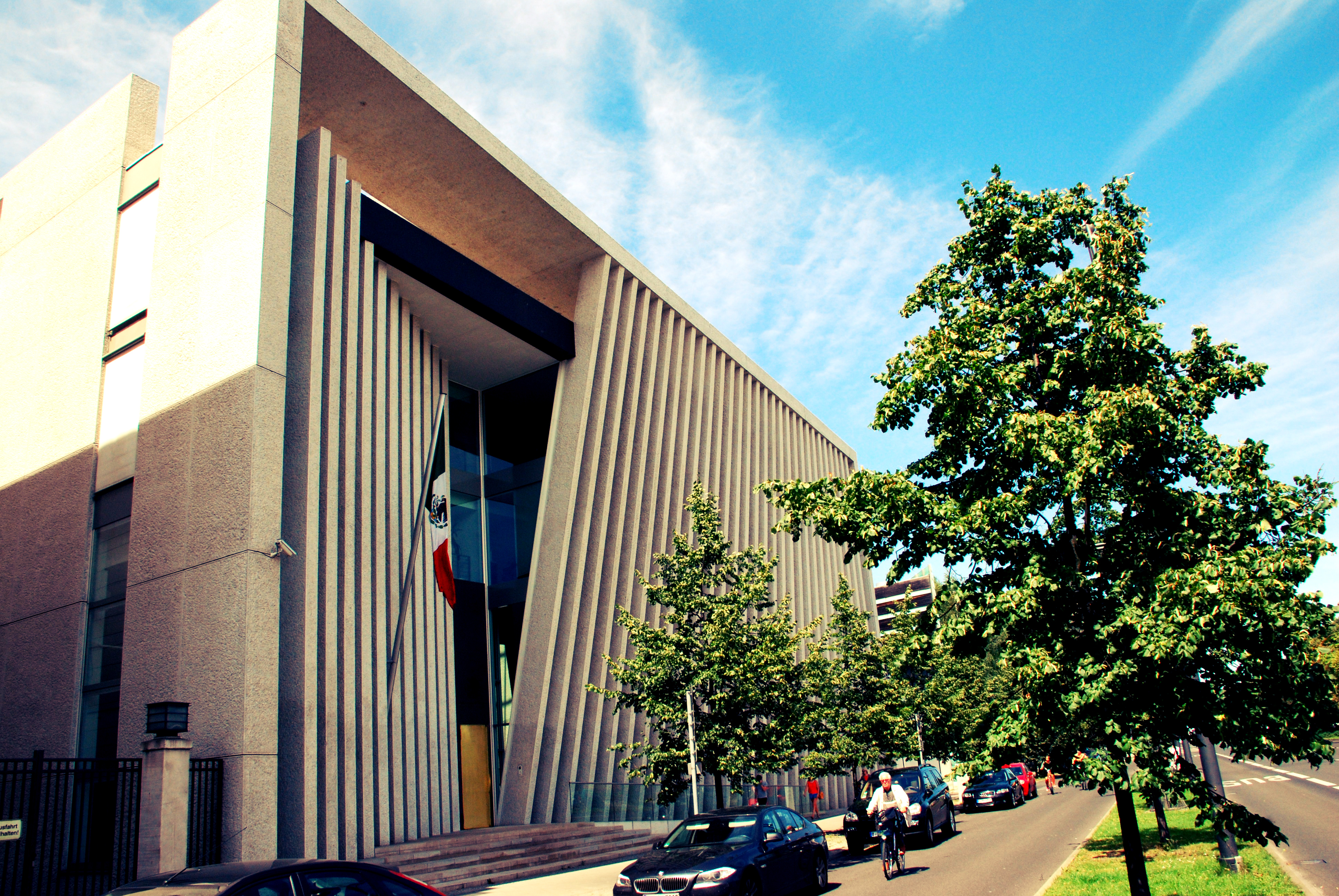
Mexican Embassy in Berlin, Germany.

- Embassy of Mexico in Berlin, Germany.
- Consulate in Frankfurt, Hasse.

== Statistics ==
Year of census	Mexican citizens in Germany
1995	4.233
2000	6.069 ▲
2005	7.649 ▲
2010	9.583 ▲
2015	14.204 ▲
2020	17.755 ▲
2021	19.200 ▲

== See also ==
- German Mexicans
- Germany–Mexico relations
- Immigration to Germany
