= Chilean Mexicans =

Chilean Mexican chileno-mexicano
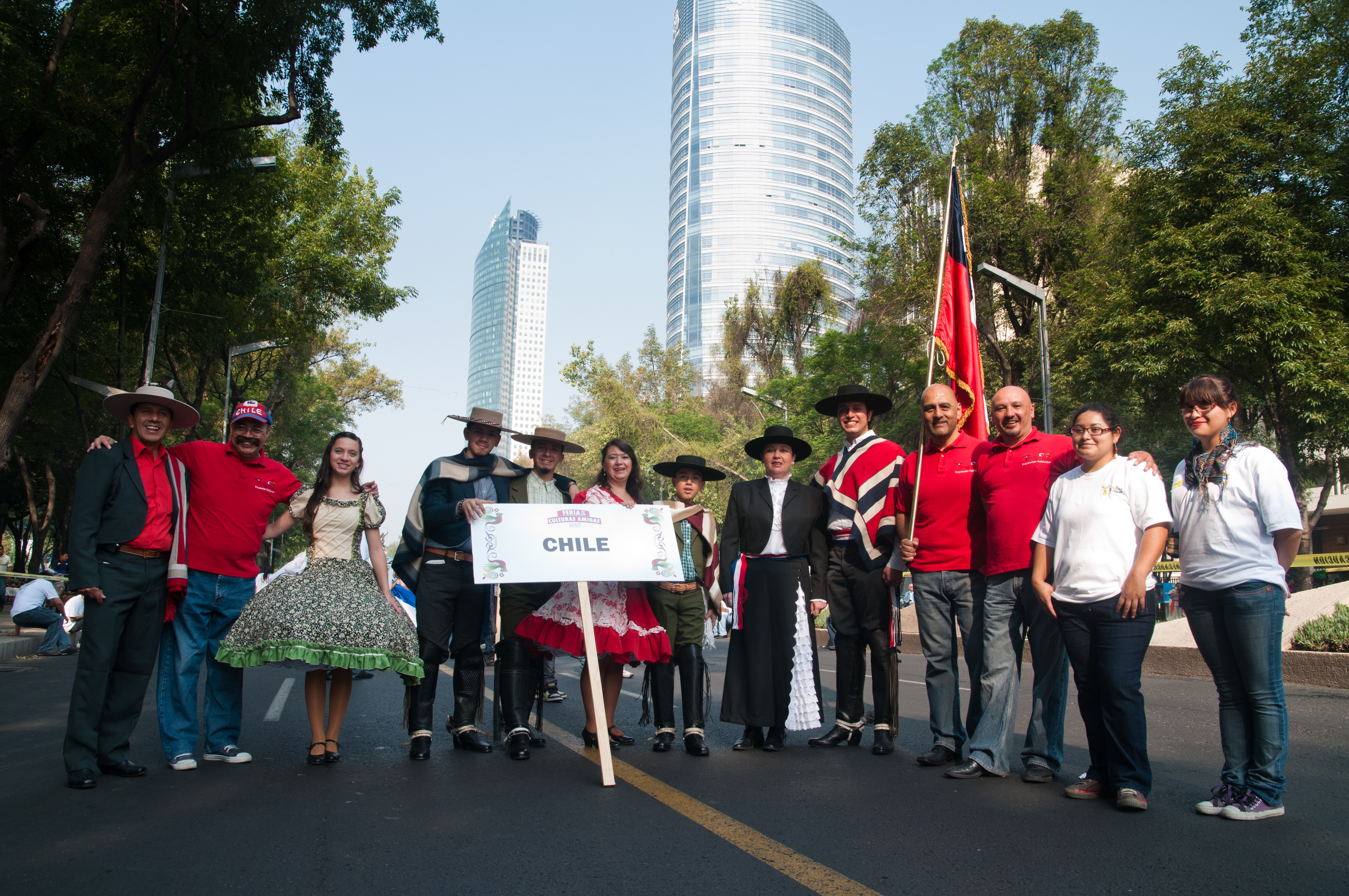
- Chilean community in Mexico City

Total population
- 7,389 Chile-born residents (2017); Unknown number of Mexicans of Chilean descent

Regions with significant populations
- Mostly concentrated in urban areas such as: Mexico City, Guadalajara, Puebla, Monterrey, León, Mérida, Cancun

Languages
- Chilean Spanish · German · English · Italian · Mapuche · Rapa Nui

Religion
- Roman Catholicism, minority Protestantism and Irreligion

Related ethnic groups
- Chileans, Mexicans

There is a small Chilean diaspora in Mexico. According to the 2010 census, there were 5,267 registered Chilean citizens living in Mexico, an increase from the 3,848 registered in the 2000 census. Chilean immigrants constitute the fifth largest community of South Americans in Mexico (after Colombian Mexicans, Argentine Mexicans, Venezuelan Mexicans and Brazilian Mexicans) and the fifteenth largest immigrant community overall.

== History ==
The first South Americans who came to an independent Mexico came from Chile and Peru, who passed through the ports of Acapulco and Puerto Ángel for supplies during the height of the gold rush in California in the mid-nineteenth century. Some Chilean and Peruvian migrants stayed and threw culturares roots among the coastal populations of the Mexican south Pacific.

In the summer of 1849, hundreds of Chileans were deceived by American filibusters to have alliances to invade the port of Guaymas, in an attempt to found the Republic of Sonora. The Chileans were taken to the camps, but the Mexican army attacked Chilean vessels and killed many immigrants accused of supporting separatists.

=== Political asylum ===
After the coup that overthrew Salvador Allende in 1973, many Chileans fled the political persecution of the dictatorship of Pinochet, seeking political asylum in Mexico, accompanied by Peruvians fleeing persecution carried out by their respective governments. The higher educational level of Mexico provided a platform to protect their stay in the country.

Many Chileans who sought political asylum, have settled permanently in Mexico. Both countries share the Spanish language; their historical origins are common (part of the Spanish Empire). They have lived peacefully in Mexico, some marrying and having families.

== Chilean culture in Mexico ==
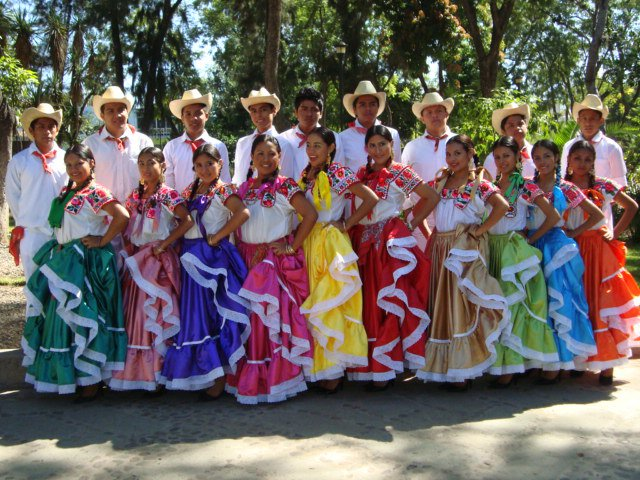
Las chilenas, a musical expression of the Costa Chica which has its origins in the Chilean folklore called cueca.

Undoubtedly, one of the cultural contributions of Chile on Mexican soil is the Chilean folk, artistic and innovative tradition of the South American sailor expressed and taught in many Guerrero and Oaxaca spaces strongly influenced by this community who arrived during and after independence from Spain.

Both countries celebrate their respective anniversaries of independence during the same month, being an important link between the two nations.

Although both countries have different mining industries, they have developed to a level that allows it to be profitable and competitive in foreign markets.

== The new wave of immigration ==
Today, the Chilean community in Mexico is one of the largest communities of foreigners in Mexico. The presence of Chileans stands mainly in large urban centers as sportsmen, academics, researchers, students, entrepreneurs and artists.

It may be mentioned also that in the technology and transport field, both countries share in their capital a metro system in common which was installed by a French consortium as the Santiago Metro and Mexico City Metro have a system trains with rubber tires, both of Alstom technology. In the 80s, when an attack took place in Santiago, the FPMR Concarril I built for Chile a NS88 train of five cars to replace the wrecked train. Both state-owned transport companies share knowledge and strategies to optimize their respective systems. Even CAF, who was winner of a bid in Santiago, designed the NS2007 Train with similarities to the NM02 Mexicano.

Chilean immigration to Mexico from 1895 to 2000
Year	Chilean residents
1895	111 ▲
1900	111 ▲
1910	161 ▲
1921	164 ▲
1930	145 ▼
1970	845 ▲
1980	3,343 ▲
1990	2,501 ▼
2000	3,848 ▲
2010	5,267 ▲

Source: Estadísticas históricas de México 2009 and Censo de Población y Vivienda 2010

== Notable individuals ==
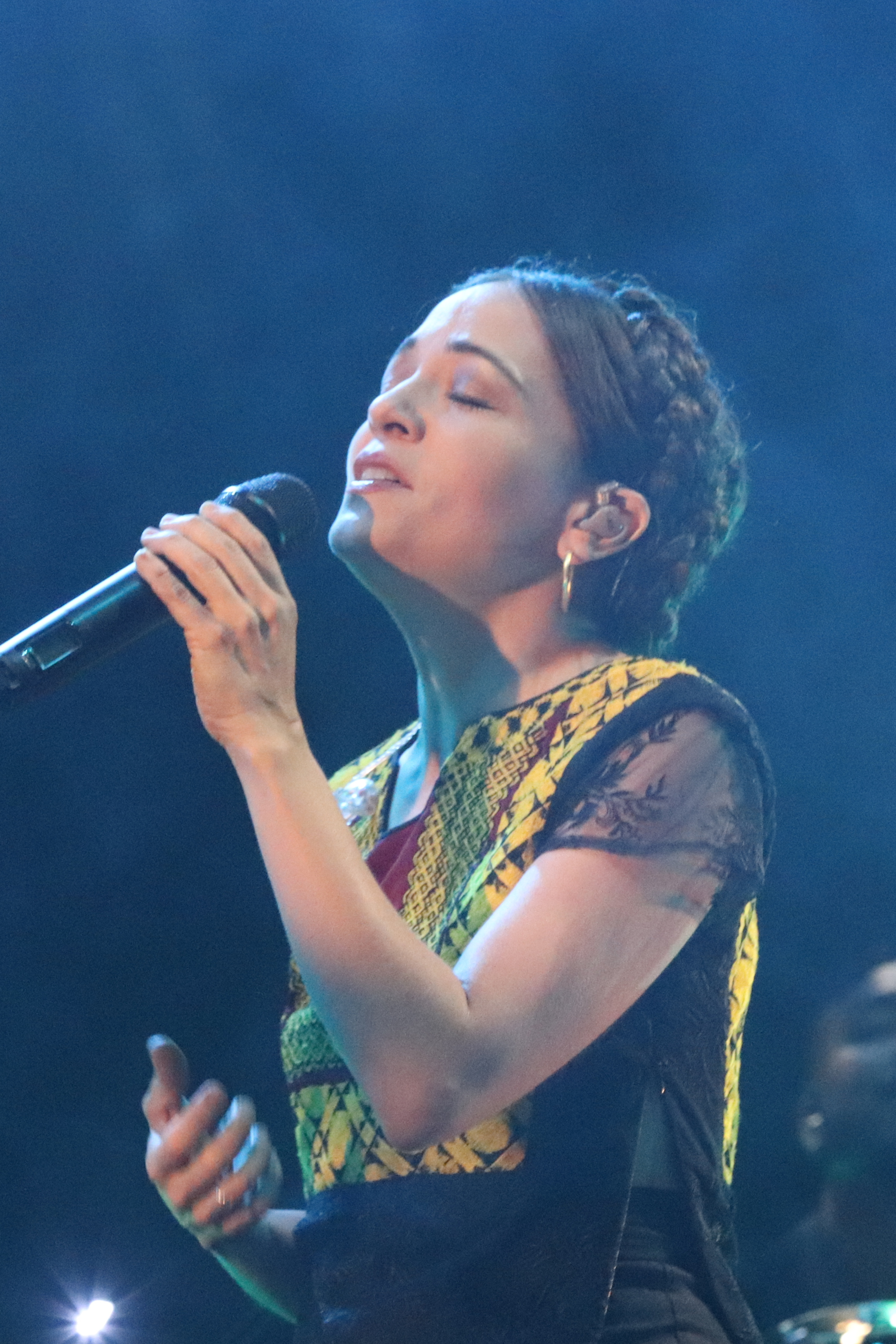
Natalia Lafourcade, singer-songwriter born to a French Chilean father

- Arap Bethke, actor
- Olivia Collins, actress
- Tito Davison, director
- Barak Fever, sports journalist
- Luis Gatica, actor
- Beatriz Gutiérrez Müller, First Lady of Mexico
- Brontis Jodorowsky, actor
- Mon Laferte, singer
- Natalia Lafourcade, singer
- Cinna Lomnitz, geophysicist
- Rodrigo Millar, footballer
- Gustavo Moscoso, footballer
- Andrés Palacios, actor
- Carlos Poblete, footballer
- Carlos Reinoso, footballer
- Rodrigo Ruiz, footballer
- Karla Souza, actress
- Sussan Taunton, actress
- Stephanie Vaquer, wrestler

== See also ==
- Chile–Mexico relations
- Mexican immigration to Chile
- Immigration to Mexico
