= Chile–Mexico Free Trade Agreement =

Chile–Mexico relations

- Chile: Mexico

Chile–Mexico Free Trade Agreement is a trade agreement between Chile and Mexico. It was signed in Santiago, Chile, on April 17, 1998. The agreement came into effect on 1 August 1999. This treaty marked the first of its kind for Mexico and second for Chile, after their agreement with Canada. The goals of the agreement are to stimulate expansion and diversity of trade, eliminate barriers to trade, promote fair competition, increase investment opportunity, protect and enforce intellectual property rights, establish guidelines for further cooperations, and create procedures for the application and enforcement of the treaty.

== Trade Statistics ==
The Chile–Mexico Free Trade Agreement originally aimed to program and automate liberalization of 95% of products in the tariff universe, but 98.3% of products were freed of tariffs by 2016. Between 1998 and 2001, Mexico's imports from Chile (in millions of USD) increased from $552.0 to $975.0, and Chile's imports from Mexico (in millions of USD) decreased from $859.9 to $532.9. By 2005, total trade between Chile and Mexico had increased by 1200% since the FTA came into effect. As of 2016, Mexico was the 10th largest importer of Chilean goods, 22% of which was "Forest Manufactures". The total value of goods exchanged has fallen from $4.2 billion in 2008 to US$3.202 billion in 2016. As of 2013, Chile was ranked as the 22nd largest importer of Mexican goods.

== Goals of the Agreement ==
The goals of the agreement are described within the agreement as follows:

- Stimulate the expansion and diversification of trade between the Parties;
- Eliminate barriers to trade and facilitate the movement of goods and services in the free trade zone;
- Promote conditions of fair competition in the free trade zone;
- Substantially increase investment opportunities in the free trade zone;
- Protect and enforce, in an adequate and effective manner, the intellectual property rights in the free trade zone;
- Establish guidelines for further cooperation among the Parties, as well as at the regional and multilateral levels, aimed at expanding and improving the benefits of the agreement;
- Create effective procedures for the application and enforcement of the Treaty, for its joint administration and for the resolution of disputes.

== Provisions ==
The provisions within the agreement cover the following topics:

- Rules of origin; ensuring that the source country of the goods imported/exported is documented accurately.
- Sanitary and phytosanitary measures; enforcing standards for clean produce and goods.
- Technical regulations and standards; including processing regulations and guidelines.
- Safeguards, rules and procedures to prevent injury from unforeseen trade conditions in either party.
- Anti-dumping measures; reciprocal elimination of anti-dumping duties.
- Investment; performance requirements, non-conforming measures, transfers, compensation and benefits, implementation, and dispute settlement.
- Transparency; publishing laws, regulations and administrative rulings promptly, allowing the other party to comment.

== See also ==
- Chile–Mexico relations
