= Mexican immigration to Chile =

Mexicans in Chile Mexicanos en Chile
Total population
- Censal: 10,380 (2019); Others: 18,700 hab. (2010)

Regions with significant populations
- Santiago

Languages
- Mexican Spanish and Chilean Spanish

Religion
- Roman Catholicism and Protestantism

Related ethnic groups
- Mexicans of European descent, Indigenous peoples of Mexico, Mestizos in Mexico

Mexican immigration to Chile (Spanish: Inmigración mexicana en Chile) comprise people who emigrated from Mexico to Chile and their descendants. The Mexican community in Chile is small. Both countries share the Spanish language; their historical origins are common (part of the Spanish Empire). Chile officially counts the Mexican population to be 1,874. Most Mexicans living in Chile do it temporarily, usually for study or for work for about two or three years, so it is a community that is continually renewed. Several of the Mexicans have made Chile their home permanently, especially those who have married Chilean citizen or citizens, or who have found a career opportunity. In fact, several Mexican companies have settled in Chile, such as the Ideal Group (Bimbo) Telmex, America Movil (Claro (Telcel). The Mexicans Association of Chile (www.mexicanos.cl and Facebook "Mexicans in Chile") organizes throughout the year to preserve and promote Mexican traditions such as Epiphany Day, Mother's Day, Children's Day, Day of the Dead, Mass and serenade to the Virgin of Guadalupe, Posadas, etc. Without overlooking Independence Day in September, to commemorate the independence of Mexico, in which members come together. It usually is attended by Mexicans who reside mainly in the capital and neighboring regions. It is one of the most important celebrations that brings together more than 2,500 people every year.

== See also ==
- Chile–Mexico relations
- Mexican diaspora
- Immigration to Chile
- Chilean Mexicans
- Mexican music in Chile
