= Mexicans =

People of the United Mexican States

Mexicans mexicanos

Total population
- c. 137.2 million Mexican diaspora: c. 12 million 1.9% of the world's population

Regions with significant populations
- Mexico 129,875,529
- United States: 10,918,205
- Canada: 155,380
- Spain: 61,194
- Germany: 41,000
- France: 40,000
- Brazil: 26,076
- Guatemala: 18,000
- United Kingdom: 16,050
- Chile: 14,402
- Australia: 10,754
- Costa Rica: 10,188
- Bolivia: 9,797
- Netherlands: 8,252
- Argentina: 7,828
- Switzerland: 7,789
- Puerto Rico: 7,320
- Israel: 6,321
- Belize: 6,000
- Panama: 5,188
- Italy: 4,767
- Sweden: 4,155
- Japan: 3,504
- China: 3,361
- Norway: 3,084
- Colombia: 3,050
- Belgium: 2,745
- Ireland: 2,654
- Austria: 2,437
- New Zealand: 2,080
- Paraguay: 1,805
- United Arab Emirates: 1,744
- Denmark: 1,579
- El Salvador: 1,543
- Ecuador: 1,503
- Honduras: 1,468
- Dominican Republic: 1,298
- Peru: 1,177
- Finland: 1,159
- Cuba: 1,058
- Other countries combined: 370,633

Languages
- Spanish, numerous indigenous languages, English, other languages of Mexico

Religion
- Predominantly Catholic; religious minorities including: Protestants, atheists, agnostics and others exist

Related ethnic groups
- Hispanos (Californios, Neomexicanos, Tejanos); Spaniards; Mestizos; Afro-Mexicans; Mexican Americans; Indigenous peoples of Mexico; other Latin Americans

Mexicans (Spanish: mexicanos) are the citizens and nationals of the United Mexican States. The Mexican people have varied origins with the most spoken language being Spanish, but many also speak languages from 68 different Indigenous linguistic groups and other languages brought to Mexico by expatriates or recent immigration. In 2020, 19.4% of Mexico's population identified as Indigenous. There are currently about 12 million Mexican nationals residing outside Mexico, with about 11.7 million living in the United States. The larger Mexican diaspora can also include individuals that trace ancestry to Mexico and self-identify as Mexican but are not necessarily Mexican by citizenship. The United States has the largest Mexican population in the world after Mexico at 11,143,711 in 2024.

The modern nation of Mexico achieved independence from the Spanish Empire in 1821, after a decade-long war for independence starting in 1810; this began the process of forging a national identity that fused the cultural traits of Indigenous pre-Columbian origin with those of Spanish and African ancestry. This led to what has been termed "a peculiar form of multi-ethnic nationalism" which was more invigorated and developed after the Mexican Revolution when the Constitution of 1917 officially established Mexico as an indivisible pluricultural nation founded on its indigenous roots.

== History and definitions ==
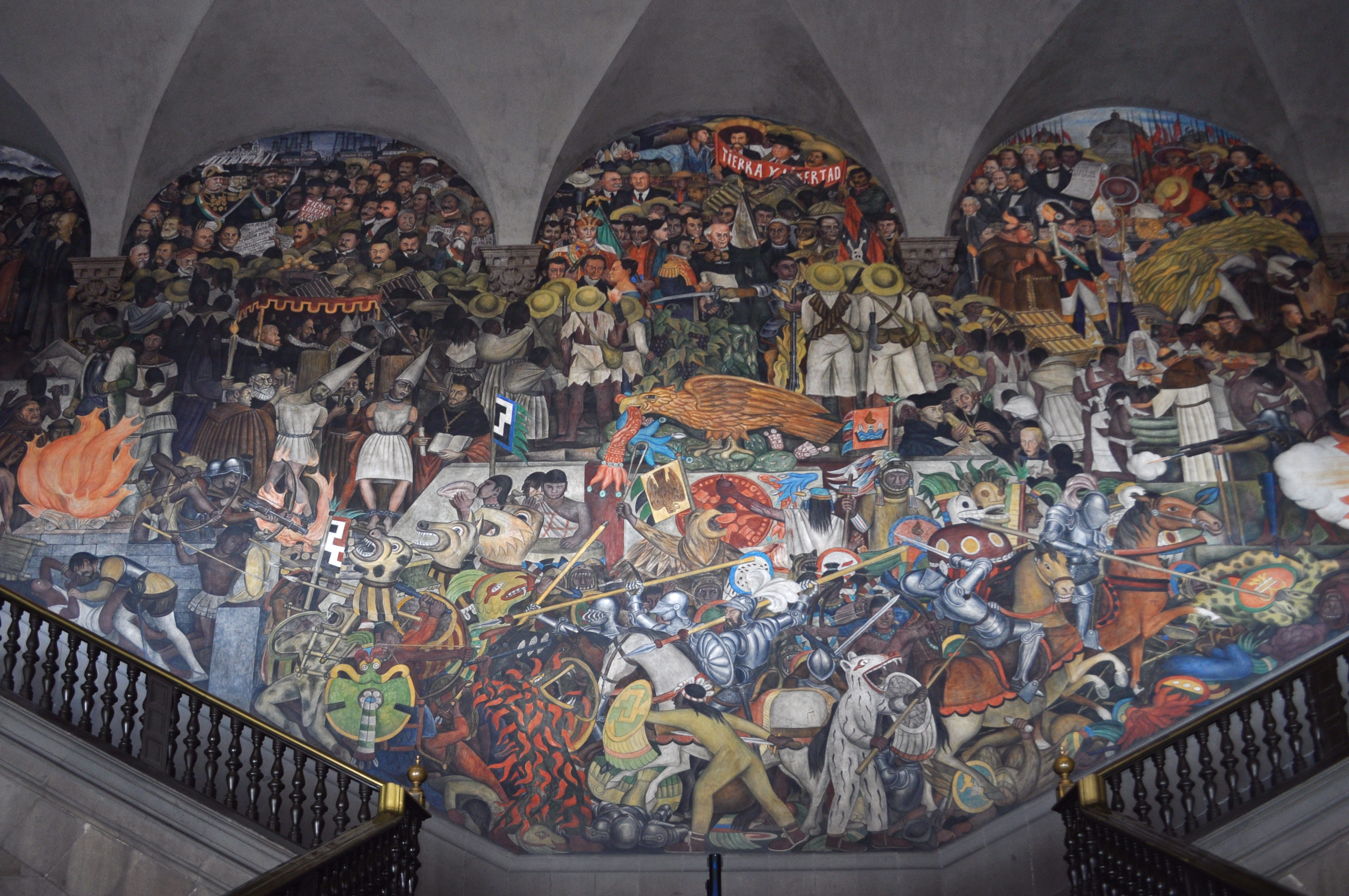
Mural by Diego Rivera at the National Palace depicting the history of Mexico from the Conquest to early 20th century

Mexicano (Mexican) is derived from the word Mexico itself. In the principal model to create demonyms in Spanish, the suffix -ano is added to the name of the place of origin. However, in Nahuatl language, the original demonym becomes Mexica. The area that is now modern-day Mexico has cradled many predecessor civilizations, going back as far as the Olmec which influenced the latter civilizations of Teotihuacan (200 BC to 700 AD) and the much debated Toltec people who flourished around the 10th and 12th centuries AD, and ending with the last great indigenous civilization before the Nahuatl language was a common tongue in the region of modern Central Mexico during the Aztec Empire, but after the arrival of Europeans and the Spanish Conquest, the conquest of the Aztec empire (February 1519 to 13 August 1521) the common language of the region became Spanish.

The Spanish re-administered the land and expanded their own empire beyond the former boundaries of the Aztec, adding more territory to the Mexican sphere of influence which remained under the Spanish Crown for 300 years. It has been suggested that the name of the country is derived from Mextli or Mēxihtli, a secret name for the god of war and patron of the Mexicas, Huitzilopochtli, in which case Mēxihco means "Place where Huitzilopochtli lives". Another hypothesis suggests that Mēxihco derives from the Nahuatl words for "Moon" (Mētztli) and navel (xīctli). This meaning ("Place at the Center of the Moon") might then refer to Tenochtitlan's position in the middle of Lake Texcoco. The system of interconnected lakes, of which Texcoco formed the center, had the form of a rabbit, which the Mesoamericans pareidolically associated with the Moon. Still another hypothesis suggests that it is derived from Mēctli, the goddess of maguey.

== Ethnic groups ==
=== Mestizo Mexicans ===
The majority of Mexicans have some combination of Spanish and Mesoamerican ancestry. The term "Mestizos" (lit. 'mixed') is used for this identity, which incorporates elements from both Spanish and indigenous traditions. The post-revolutionary governments and reformers such as José Vasconcelos and Manuel Gamio made deliberate efforts to construct this as the base of a modern Mexican national identity. This process of cultural synthesis is referred to as mestizaje [mestiˈsaxe]. One goal of this was to assimilate indigenous peoples into a single Mestizo Mexican society.

Mexico does not have a strict definition of race, and Mestizo identity is influenced by culture and language.

Since the word Mestizo has had different definitions through Mexico's history, precise estimates of the Mexican Mestizo population are impossible. According to the Encyclopædia Britannica, about three-fifths of the Mexican population is Mestizo. A culture-based criteria estimates the percentage of Mestizos as high as 90%.

In certain areas of Mexico the word Mestizo has a different meaning: in the Yucatán peninsula it has been used to refer to the Maya-speaking populations living in traditional communities, because during the caste war of the late 19th century those Maya who did not join the rebellion were classified as Mestizos whereas in the state of Chiapas the word "Ladino" is used instead of "mestizo".

Detractors of the Mestizo ideology have described it as delegitimizing the role of race in Mexico and perpetuating the misconception that racism does not exist in the country.

=== White Mexicans ===
Europeans began arriving in Mexico during the Spanish conquest of the Aztec Empire; while during the colonial period most European immigration was Spanish, in the 19th and 20th centuries European and European-derived populations from other countries immigrated to the country in significant numbers.

Estimates of Mexico's white population differ greatly in both methodology and definitions. The World Factbook estimated Mexico's European population at less than 10% in 2012.

=== Indigenous Mexicans ===
The 2003 General Law of Linguistic Rights of the Indigenous Peoples recognizes 62 indigenous languages as "national languages" which have the same validity as Spanish in all territories in which they are spoken. The recognition of indigenous languages and the protection of indigenous cultures is granted not only to the ethnic groups indigenous to modern-day Mexican territory, but also to other North American indigenous groups that migrated to Mexico from the United States, such as the Kikapú in the 19th century and those who immigrated from Guatemala in the 1980s. The category of indigena (indigenous) in Mexico has been defined based on different criteria through history; this means that the percentage of the Mexican population defined as "indigenous" varies according to the definition applied. It can be defined narrowly according to linguistic criteria including only persons that speak an indigenous language. Based on this criterion, approximately 5.4% of the population is Indigenous. Nonetheless, activists for the rights of indigenous peoples have referred to the usage of this criterion for census purposes as "statistical genocide".

Other surveys made by the Mexican government do count as Indigenous all persons who speak an indigenous language and persons who neither speak indigenous languages nor live in indigenous communities but self-identify as Indigenous. According to this criterion, the National Commission for the Development of Indigenous Peoples (Comisión Nacional para el Desarrollo de los Pueblos Indígenas, or CDI in Spanish) and the INEGI (Mexico's National Institute of Statistics and Geography), stated that there are 15.7 million indigenous people in Mexico of many different ethnic groups, which constitute 14.9% of the population in the country. (Note: Defined as persons who live in a household where an indigenous language is spoken by one of the adult family members, and or people who self identified as indigenous ("Criteria del hogar: De esta manera, se establece, que los hogares indígenas son aquellos en donde el jefe y/o el cónyuge y/o padre o madre del jefe y/o suegro o suegra del jefe hablan una lengua indígena y también aquellos que declararon pertenecer a un grupo indígena." and persons who speak an indigenous language but who do not live in such a household ("Por lo antes mencionado, la Comisión Nacional Para el Desarrollo de los Pueblos Indígenas de México (CDI) considera población indígena (PI) a todas las personas que forman parte de un hogar indígena, donde el jefe(a) del hogar, su cónyuge y/o alguno de los ascendientes (madre o padre, madrastra o padrastro, abuelo(a), bisabuelo(a), tatarabuelo(a), suegro(a)) declaro ser hablante de lengua indígena. Además, también incluye a personas que declararon hablar alguna lengua indígena y que no forman parte de estos hogares")) According to the latest intercensal survey carried out by the Mexican government in 2015, Indigenous people make up 21.5% of Mexico's population. In this occasion, people who self-identified as "Indigenous" and people who self-identified as "partially Indigenous" were classified in the "Indigenous" category altogether. In the 2020 Mexican census 19.4% of the country's population self-identified as indigenous and 9.36% were reported to live in Indigenous households.

The absolute indigenous population is growing, but at a slower rate than the rest of the population so that the percentage of indigenous peoples is nonetheless falling. The majority of the indigenous population is concentrated in the central-southern and south-eastern states, with the majority of the indigenous population living in rural areas. Some indigenous communities have a degree of autonomy under the legislation of "usos y costumbres" (usages and customs), which allows them to regulate some internal issues under customary law.

According to the CDI, the states with the greatest percentage of indigenous population are Yucatán, with 62.7%, Quintana Roo with 33.8% and Campeche with 32% of the population being indigenous, most of them Maya; Oaxaca with 58% of the population, the most numerous groups being the Mixtec and Zapotec peoples; Chiapas has 32.7%, the majority being Tzeltal and Tzotzil Maya; Hidalgo with 30.1%, the majority being Otomi; Puebla with 25.2%, and Guerrero with 22.6%, mostly Nahua people and the states of San Luis Potosí and Veracruz both home to a population of 19% indigenous people, mostly from the Totonac, Nahua and Teenek (Huastec) groups.

=== Afro-Mexicans ===
Afro-Mexicans are an ethnic group that predominate in certain areas of Mexico such as the Costa Chica of Oaxaca and the Costa Chica of Guerrero, Veracruz (e.g. Yanga) and in some towns in northern Mexico, mainly in Múzquiz Municipality, Coahuila. The existence of individuals of African descent in Mexico has its origins in the slave trade that took place during colonial times and that did not end until 1829. Historically, the presence of this ethnic group within the country has been difficult to assess for a number of reasons: their small numbers, heavy intermarriage with other ethnic groups, and Mexico's tradition of defining itself as a Mestizo society or mixing of European and indigenous only. Nowadays this ethnic group also includes recent immigrants from Africa, the Caribbean and elsewhere in the Americas.

The majority of Mexico's Afro-descendants are Afromestizos, i.e. "mixed-race". According to the intercensal survey carried out in 2015, 1.2% of the population self-identified as Afro-Mexican with 64.9% (896,829) of them also identifying as indigenous and 9.3% being speakers of indigenous languages. In the 2020 INEGI census carried out by the Mexican government, Afro-Mexicans were reported to make up 2.04% of the country's population.

=== Other ethno-cultural communities ===
==== Jewish Mexicans ====
A Jewish, specifically Sephardic, population has existed in Mexico since the start of the Spanish invasion and occupation of Mexico. The current Jewish population in Mexico mostly consists of those who have descended from immigrants from the 19th and early 20th centuries with nationwide totals estimated between 80,000 and 90,000, about 75% of whom are in Mexico City. The exact numbers are not known. One main source for figures is the Comité Central Israelita in Mexico City but its contact is limited to Orthodox and Conservative congregations with no contact with Jews that may be affiliated with the Reform movement or those who consider themselves secular. The Mexican government census lists religion but its categories are confusing, confusing those of some Protestant sects which practice Judaic rituals with Jewish groups. There is also controversy as to whether to count those crypto-Jews who have converted (back) to Judaism. Sixty-two percent of the population over fifteen is married, three percent divorced and four percent widowed. However, younger Jewish women are more likely to be employed outside the home (only 18% of women are housewives) and fertility rates are dropping from 3.5 children of women over 65 to 2.7 for the overall population now. There is a low level of intermarriage with the general Mexican population, with only 3.1% of marriages being mixed. Although the Jewish community is less than one percent of Mexico's total population, Mexico is one of the few countries whose Jewish population is expected to grow.

==== German Mexicans ====
German Mexicans (German: Deutschmexikaner or Deutsch-Mexikanisch, Spanish: germano-mexicano or alemán-mexicano) are Mexicans of German descent or origin.

Most ethnic Germans arrived in Mexico during the mid-to-late 19th century, spurred by government policies of Porfirio Díaz. Although a good number of them took advantage of the liberal policies then valid in Mexico and went into merchant, industrial and educational ventures, others arrived with no or limited capital, as employees or farmers. Most settled in Mexico City, Veracruz, Yucatán, and Puebla. Significant numbers of German immigrants also arrived during and after the First and Second World Wars. The Plautdietsch language is also spoken by the Mexican Mennonites, descendants of German and Dutch immigrants in the states of Chihuahua, Durango, Zacatecas and Aguascalientes. Other German towns lie in the states of Nuevo León, Jalisco, Sinaloa, Yucatán, Chiapas, Quintana Roo, and other parts of Puebla, where the German culture and language have been preserved to different extents.

The German Mexican community has largely integrated into Mexican society as a whole whilst retaining some cultural traits and in turn exerted cultural and industrial influences on Mexican society. Especially after the First World War intense processes of transculturation can be observed, particularly in Mexico City, Jalisco, Nuevo León, Puebla and, notably, with the Maya in Chiapas. These include social, cultural and identity aspects.

==== Arab Mexicans ====
The majority Mexicans who have at least partial Arab descent trace their ancestry to what is now Lebanon (as Lebanese Mexicans) and Syria (as Syrian Mexicans). Immigration of Arabs in Mexico has influenced Mexican culture, in particular food, where they have introduced kibbeh, tabbouleh, and have created recipes such as tacos árabes. By 1765, dates, which originated from the Middle East, were introduced into Mexico by the Spaniards. The fusion between Arab and Mexican food has highly influenced the Yucatecan cuisine.

Arab immigration to Mexico started in the 19th and early 20th centuries.

The majority of Arab-Mexicans are Christians who belong to the Maronite, Roman Catholic, Eastern Orthodox, and Eastern Rite Catholic Churches.

==== Romani Mexicans ====
The first wave of Roma arrived in Mexico in the 1890s, when they came to the Americas from Hungary, Poland and Russia and mainly settled in the United States and Brazil, but also in Mexico, Argentina, Chile, Colombia, Ecuador, Uruguay and Venezuela. There are Romani communities in the cities of Mexico City, Veracruz, Puebla, Guadalajara and Monterrey. There is also a large Romani community in San Luís Potosí.

==== Asian Mexicans ====
"Asian Mexicans" typically refers to those of East Asian descent, and may also include those of South and Southeast Asian descent, while Mexicans of West Asian descent are referred to as Arab Mexicans.

Asian immigration began with the arrival of Filipinos to Mexico during the colonial period. Between 1565 and 1815, many Filipinos and Mexicans sailed back and forth between the two countries as crews, enslaved people, adventurers, and soldiers in Manila galleons as part of Spain's trade network. Asian people who were brought to Mexico as slaves were called "Chino" (Chinese), although they were of diverse origins from many different parts of Asia. A notable example is Catarina de San Juan (Mirra), a young woman from India who was enslaved and eventually brought to New Spain, where she was briefly revered as a saint.

The reverse was also true, thousands of Mexicans immigrated to the Philippines.

Later groups of Asians, predominantly Chinese, became Mexico's fastest-growing immigrant group from the 1880s to the 1920s, growing from about 1,500 in 1895 to more than 20,000 in 1910.

=== Official censuses ===
The Viceroyalty of New Spain conducted the country's first census in 1793. Only part of the original dataset survives, thus most of what is known of it comes from references made by researchers for their own works. More than a century would pass until the Mexican government conducted a new racial census in 1921.

==== 1793 census ====
New Spain in 1819 with the boundaries established at the Adams-Onís Treaty

Also known as the "Revillagigedo census" due to its creation being ordered by the Count of the same name, this census was Mexico's (then known as the Viceroyalty of New Spain) first nationwide population census. Most of its original datasets have been lost, thus most of what is now known about it has been reconstructed from citations made by academics who had access to the census data. Reconstructions of this data varies. Europeans ranged from 18% to 22% of New Spain's population, Mestizos ranged from 21% to 25%, Amerindians ranged from 51% to 61% and Africans being between 6,000 and 10,000. The estimations given for the total population range from 3,799,561 to 6,122,354.

==== 1921 census ====
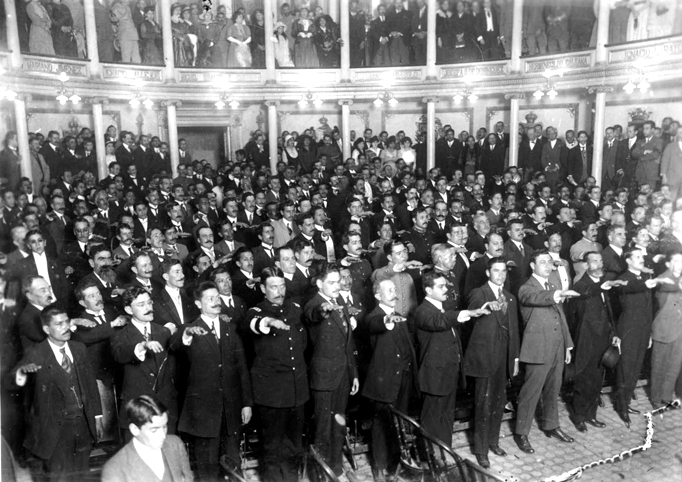
The new constitution was approved on 5 February 1917. This picture shows the Constituent Congress of 1917 swearing fealty to the new Constitution.

Made right after the consummation of the Mexican revolution, the 1921 census was in part an attempt to unite all Mexicans under a single national identity. The 1921 census' results regarding race assert that 59.3% of the Mexican population self-identified as Mestizo, 29.1% as Indigenous and 9.8% as White. This was used to promote the "mestizaje" ideology.

Population growth in Mexico, from 1910 to 2015

=== Present day ===
Since the end of the Mexican Revolution, the official identity promoted by the government for non-indigenous Mexicans has been the Mestizo one (a mix of European and indigenous culture and heritage), established with the original intent of eliminating divisions and creating a unified identity that would allow Mexico to modernize and integrate with the international community. Racism in Mexico and other forms of discrimination continue playing a role in everyday social interactions. According to a 2020 survey, 19.4% of Mexico's population self-identify as Indigenous, and 2.04% self-identify as Afro-Mexican. There is no definitive census that quantifies White Mexicans, and Mexico's government does not attempt to classify people white people. White people are known as güeros or blancos in Mexican Spanish. The lack of a clear dividing line between white and mixed race Mexicans makes race fluid and subjective, and the concept of "race" has a psychological foundation rather than a biological one.

European physical appearance is favored in Mexican society, with lighter skin receiving more positive attention, as it is associated with higher social class, power, money, and modernity. In contrast, Indigenous ancestry is often associated with having an inferior social class, as well as lower levels of education.

== Genetic studies ==
Genetic ancestry of Mexicans from Mexico City
1. White (31.0%)
2. Amerindian (66.0%)
3. African (3.00%)

Genetic studies in Mexico can be divided on three groups: studies made on self-identified Mestizos, studies made on Indigenous peoples and studies made on the general Mexican population. Studies that focus on Mexicans of predominantly European descent or Afro-Mexicans have not been made. Mexicans who self-identify as Mestizos are primarily of European and Native American ancestry. The third largest component is African, in coastal areas this is partly a legacy of the slavery in New Spain (200,000 black slaves). However, the authors of this study state that the majority of African ancestry in Mexicans is of North and Sub-Saharan African origin and was brought by the Spaniards themselves as a diluted part of their genetic ancestry.

According to the average of various studies, Mexicans are on average 50% Spanish, 45% Amerindian, and 5% African. However this varies greatly by methodology and study, some point toward a greater Amerindian admixture whereas others point toward a greater Spanish admixture. Admixture varies by region, wealth, and even study. However, it can be generally assessed that Mexicans (on average) are an even mixture of Native American and Spanish with minor African contribution, with neither European or Native being more dominant in the genetic admixture. According to these studies, Native admixture is more dominant in the Central and Southern regions of Mexico whereas Spanish admixture is more dominant in the Western and Northern regions of Mexico. Mestizos and Amerindians tend to have slightly more dominant Amerindian admixture whereas Mexicans considered White tend to have dominant European admixture.

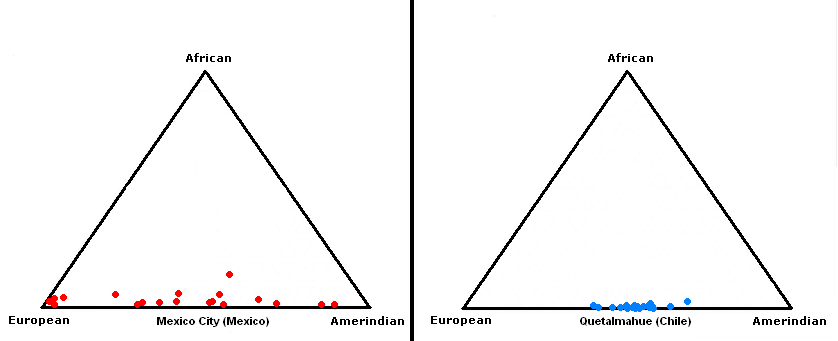
Distribution of Admixture Estimates for Individuals from Mexico City and Quetalmahue.

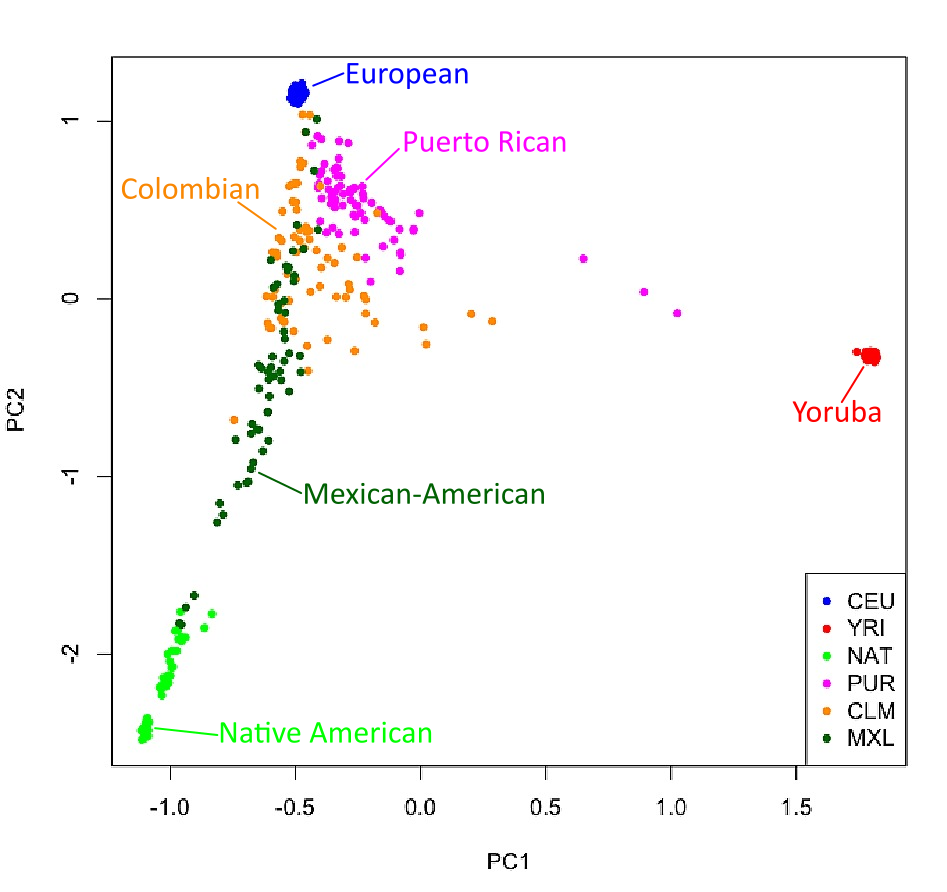
PCA of modern African and Eurasian human genomes. Mexicans are positioned along a cline between the 'Native American' (or 'Asian') cluster and between the European cluster.

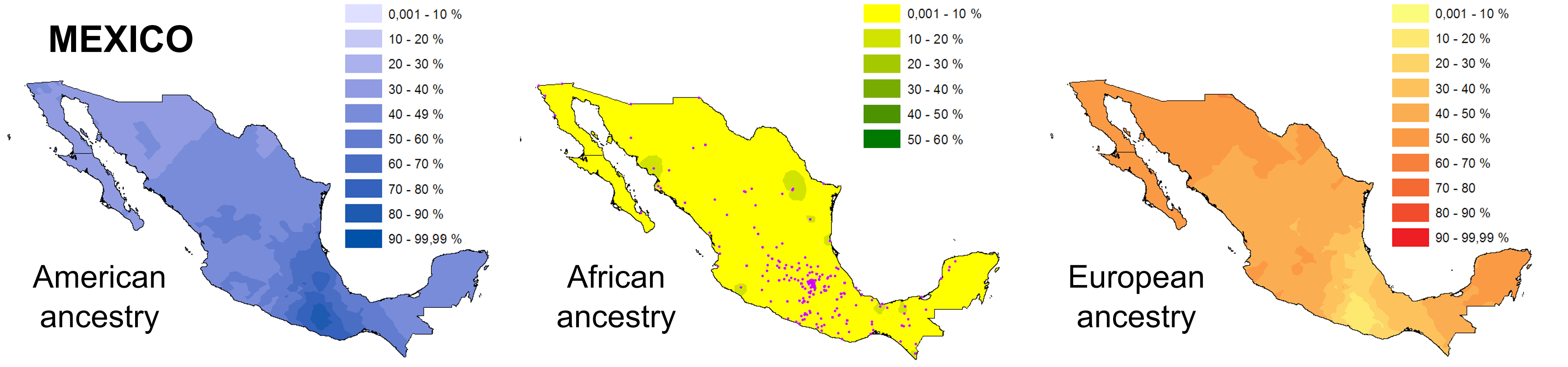
Regional Variation of ancestry according to a study made by Ruiz-Linares in 2014, each dot represents a volunteer, with most coming from south Mexico and Mexico City.

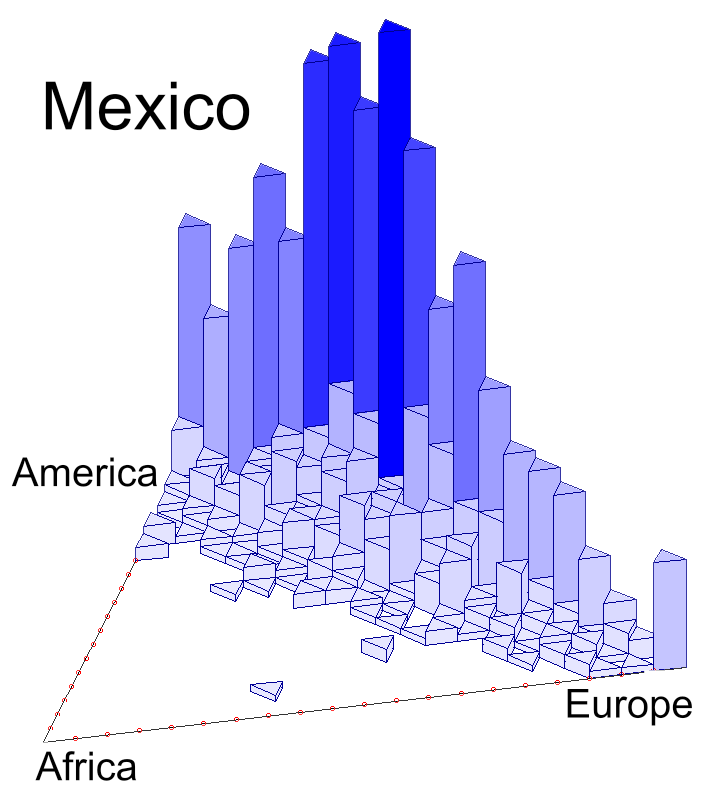
Trivate for ancestry, from the same study as the image above (Ruiz-Linares in 2014).

Those DNA studies on Mexicans show a significant genetic variation depending on the region analyzed, with the central region of Mexico showing a balance between indigenous and European components, and the latter gradually increasing as one travels northwards and westwards, where European ancestry becomes the majority of the genetic contribution up until cities located at the Mexico–United States border, where studies suggest there is a significant resurgence of indigenous and African admixture. In southern Mexico there is prevalent indigenous Meso-American, but also European admixture, and a small but higher than average African genetic contributions.

According to numerous studies, on average, the largest genetic component of Mexicans who self-identify as being Mestizos is indigenous, although the difference in incidence between the indigenous and European composites is relatively small, both representing well over 40% of the genetic composition of Mestizos.

In two studies of Mexicans from Mexico City and the United States, researchers noted that Mexicans on average had just over half European ancestry, with Native American ancestry making up 44% of the general ancestry of Mexicans. However, Native American X chromosomal ancestry exceeded 50%, and other studies found that approximately 90% of Mexicans carried a Native American maternal haplogroup. The authors suggest that this is consistent with the ethnogenesis of Latinos, through intermarriages that mostly involved European men and Native American women.

Extant research suggests that geographic location plays a more significant role on determining the genetic makeup of the average Indigenous person than cultural traits do, an example of this is the indigenous population of Tlapa in the state of Guerrero, that despite for the most part speaking Spanish and having the same cultural customs non-indigenous Mexicans have, shows an indigenous ancestry of 95%. In contrast, one study shows Nahua-speaking Indigenous peoples from Coyolillo, Veracruz, having a mean European ancestry of 42% and an African ancestry of 22%.

The Mestizaje ideology, which has blurred the lines of race at an institutional level has also had a significant influence in genetic studies done in Mexico: As the criterion used in studies to determine if a Mexican is Mestizo or indigenous often lies in cultural traits such as the language spoken instead of racial self-identification or a phenotype-based selection, there are studies on which populations who are considered to be Indigenous per virtue of the language spoken show a higher degree of European genetic admixture than the one populations considered to be Mestizo report in other studies, while some mestizo populations, such as those in the state of Tlaxcala, have an average of over 75% Indigenous ancestry. The opposite also happens, as there instances on which populations considered to be Mestizo show genetic frequencies similar to continental European peoples in the case of Mestizos from the state of Durango or to European derived Americans in the case of Mestizos from the state of Jalisco.

In 1991, an autosomal study was performed in Mexicans from the states of Nuevo Leon, Zacatecas and San Luis Potosí, with a sample pool of 207. It found the average admixture to be 78.46% Spanish and 21.54% "Mexican Indian" (Indigenous). The data also shows younger generations having higher Native American admixture compared to older ones. In the report, the oldest generation had an averaged total of 91.14% Spanish ancestry.

A 2006 study conducted by Mexico's National Institute of Genomic Medicine (INMEGEN), which genotyped 104 samples, reported that mestizo Mexicans are 58.96% European, 35.05% "Asian" (Native American), and 5.03% Black. Of the six states that participated in the Study, the state of Sonora showed the highest European ancestry being approximately 70% while the State of Guerrero presented the lowest European ancestry, at around 50%. However is 2009, the same team published an updated finding, which sampled 300 Mexicans who self-identified as Mestizos, the average admixture was calculated to be 55.2% percent Native American, 41.8% European, 2% African, and 0.5% Asian.

In 2014, researchers looked through approximately twenty previous studies done on the admixture of Mexicans. Their general conclusion was the average Mexican is more Native American than European.

Subsequently, in 2015, a separate team of researchers performed a meta-analysis, incorporating the findings of many previous studies with additional research. This comprehensive analysis revealed a genetic composition with an average of 62% Native American, 32% European, and 6% African.

Mexican states by population density

A 2017 study reported highly variable ancestry in Mexican Mestizos, ranging from 70.2%–46.2% Amerindian; 25.4%–48.7% European; 2.8%–5.2% African (Martínez-Cortés et al., 2017).

In 2014, a genetic study gave results of 56.0% Amerindian; 37.0% European; and 5.0% African for Mexican Mestizos. The authors reported similar findings of geographical variation, as in other studies. Native American ancestry is lower in northerly regions of Mexico, and higher in the south. African ancestry is generally quite low across most of Mexico, with the exception of a small number of coastal communities.

An autosomal study performed in Mestizos from Mexico's three largest cities reported that Mestizos from Mexico city had an average ancestry of 50% European, 5% African and 49% Amerindian whereas Mestizos from the cities of Monterrey and Guadalajara had both a European ancestry of 60% and an indigenous ancestry of 40% in average.

An autosomal study performed in Mexico City reported that Mexican mestizos' mean ancestry was 57% European, 40% Amerindian and 3% African. However, the sample pool was extremely low at only 19. Researchers Francisco Mauro Salzano and Mónica Sans referred to it as an "anomalous value" in their report mentioned earlier.

Additional studies suggests a tendency relating a higher European admixture with a higher socioeconomic status and a higher Amerindian ancestry with a lower socioeconomic status: a study made exclusively on low income Mestizos residing in Mexico City found the mean admixture to be 59%, 34.8%, and 6.2% for Amerindian, European and African respectively whereas the European admixture increased to an average of around 70% on mestizos belonging to a higher socioeconomical level.

An autosomal genetic study which included the states of Mexico, Morelos, Puebla, Queretaro and Mexico City determined the average ancestry of the central region of Mexico to be 52% European 39% Amerindian, and 9% African.

Mexican states by total number of inhabitants

An autosomal genetic study performed in the town of Metztitlan in the state of Hidalgo reported that the average genetic ancestry of the town's autochthonous (indigenous) population was 64% Amerindian, 25% European and 11% African.

A 2012 study published by the Journal of Human Genetics of Y chromosomes found the deep paternal ancestry of the Mexican mestizo population to be predominately European (64.9%), followed by Amerindian (30.8%) and African (4.2%). (Note: "In the total population sample, paternal ancestry was predominately European (64.9%), followed by Native American (30.8%) and African (4.2%). However, the European ancestry was prevalent in the north and west (66.7–95%) and, conversely, Native American ancestry increased in the center and southeast (37–50%), whereas the African ancestry was low and relatively homogeneous (2–8.8%)." (Martínez-Cortés et al., 2012).) The European Y chromosome was more prevalent in the north and west (66.7–95%) and Native American ancestry increased in the center and southeast (37–50%), the African ancestry was low and relatively homogeneous (2–8.8%). The states that participated in this study where Aguascalientes, Chiapas, Chihuahua, Durango, Guerrero, Jalisco, Oaxaca, Sinaloa, Veracruz and Yucatán. (Note: Figure 3 (Martínez-Cortés et al., 2012).) The largest amount of chromosomes found were identified as belonging to the haplogroups from Western Europe, East Europe and Eurasia, Siberia and the Americas and Northern Europe with relatively smaller traces of haplogroups from Central Asia, South-east Asia, South-central Asia, Western Asia, The Caucasus, North Africa, Near East, East Asia, North-east Asia, South-west Asia and the Middle East. (Note: Figure 2 (Martínez-Cortés et al., 2012).)

Depending on the region, some may have small traces of Asian admixture due to the thousands of Filipinos and Chinos (Asian slaves of diverse origins, not just Chinese) that arrived on the Nao de China. More recent Asian immigration (specifically Chinese) may help explain the comparatively high Asian contribution in Northwest Mexico (i.e., Sonora).

=== Genetic Ancestry by State ===
A study published in the journal Human Immunology analyzed the genetic ancestry of the mestizo Mexican population based on HLA haplotypes, estimating the overall contribution of European, Amerindian, and African ancestry to the self-identified mestizo population in each state. Indigenous ancestry predominated among the sample in 22 out of the 30 states included in the study, while European ancestry was predominant in 8 states, all in the north or west of the country. The study found significantly higher levels of Indigenous and African ancestry than most other studies, especially in states in Northern Mexico, representing an outlier in this regard. The results for each state are shown in this table.

State	# of samples	Indigenous ancestry	European ancestry	African ancestry
Aguascalientes	95	54.5%	44.3%	<1.0%
Baja California	250	43.7%	50.5%	5.8%
Campeche	81	65.6%	34.4%	<1.0%
Chiapas	173	71.7%	26.4%	2.0%
Chihuahua	461	39.5%	52.1%	8.4%
Coahuila	684	45.0%	49.7%	5.3%
Colima	104	52.7%	37.5%	9.7%
Durango	479	45.7%	54.3%	<1.0%
Guanajuato	262	50.6%	44.1%	5.2%
Guerrero	144	61.4%	35.0%	3.6%
Hidalgo	122	58.9%	32.5%	8.6%
Jalisco	2046	44.0%	48.5%	7.5%
Mexico City	1217	63.9%	28.5%	7.6%
Michoácan	498	48.8%	43.1%	8.1%
Morelos	112	60.4%	39.6%	<1.0%
Nayarit	161	50.8%	37.0%	12.2%
Nuevo León	665	54.5%	38.7%	6.8%
Oaxaca	636	73.1%	17.4%	9.5%
Puebla	2827	72.2%	21.1%	6.7%
Querétaro	88	51.8%	48.2%	<1.0%
Quintana Roo	98	80.9%	15.2%	4.0%
San Luis Potosí	117	52.7%	34.6%	12.7%
Sinaloa	286	37.6%	62.4%	<1.0%
Sonora	439	43.4%	51.3%	5.4%
Tabasco	224	67.8%	27.2%	5.0%
Tamaulipas	148	54.7%	34.7%	10.7%
Tlaxcala	1011	75.1%	16.1%	8.8%
Veracruz	1113	64.9%	26.6%	8.5%
Zacatecas	453	44.7%	47.6%	7.7%

=== Etiological studies ===
Etiological studies are genetic studies on which volunteers suffer of a specific health condition/disease, as diseases tend to manifest on higher frequencies on people with a determinated genetic ancestry, the results of said studies are not accurate to represent the genetics of the population said volunteers belong to as a whole

- 56.0% Amerindian; 38% European; 6% African for northeast de México (Martínez-Fierro et al., 2009).
- 61.0% Amerindian; 37.0% European; 2.0% African for Ciudad de México (Kosoy et al., 2009).
- 65.0% Amerindian; 30.0% European; 5.0% African for Ciudad de México.

=== Phenotypical research ===
Studies of different phenotypical traits (hair color, hair shape, eye color etc.) in Mexicans have been conducted to document racial and ethnic inequality. The results of these studies refute misconceptions regarding Mexico's population, showing that Mexico is a diverse country, where any color or type of trait can be found with ease in any region.

One study published by the American Sociological Association found the differences in the frequencies of phenotypical traits such as blond hair between the population of the Northern regions of Mexico (where this trait has a frequency of 22.3%–23.9%) and the population of the Central regions of Mexico (with a frequency of 18.9%–21.3%).

A 2014 study made by the University College London analyzed the frequencies of several different phenotypical traits on populations of five different Latin American countries (Brazil, Chile, Colombia, Mexico and Peru). In the case of Mexico the National Institute of Anthropology and History collaborated in the investigation with the results being the following:

Eye color	blue/grey	honey	green	light brown	dark brown/black
Males	1%	2%	6%	21%	71%
Females	1%	3%	4%	21%	72%

Hair color	red/reddish	blond	dark blond/light brown	brown/black
Males	0%	1%	12%	86%
Females	0%	2%	21%	77%

Hair shape	straight	wavy	curly	frizzy
Males	45%	43%	12%	0%
Females	46%	41%	12%	1%

Most samples (approximately 90%) came from Mexico City and the southern states of Mexico, meaning that the northern and western states of Mexico were underrepresented, as about 45% of Mexico's population lives there.

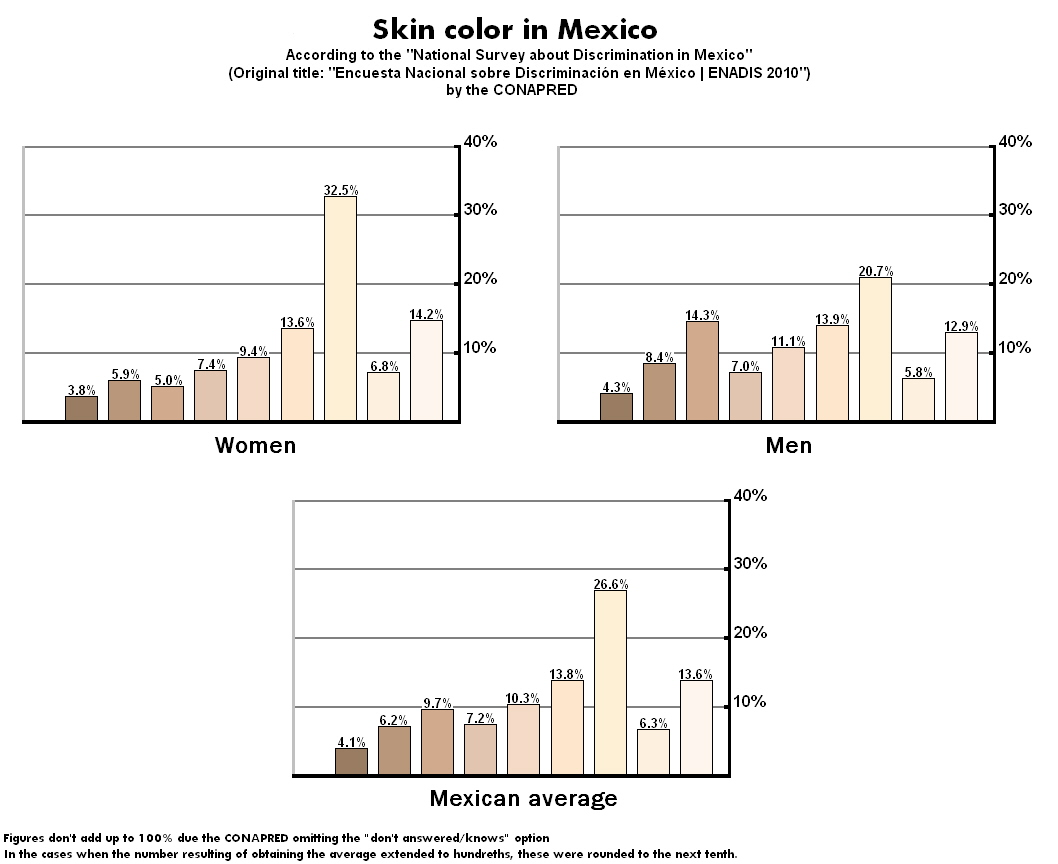
Results of the survey conducted by the CONAPRED in 2010.

Nationwide surveys sponsored by the Mexican government that quantify the percentage of the different skin tones present on Mexico's population have been made, the first in 2010 by the CONAPRED (Mexico's National Bureau for Prevention of Discrimination) and the second in 2017 by the INEGI (Mexico's National Institute of Statistics). Each study used a different color palette, in the case of CONAPRED's study it was a palette with 9 color choices developed by the institute itself whereas in the case of the INEGI study the palette used was the palette for the PERLA (Latin American Race and Ethnicity Project) with 11 color categories.

Skin Type	Percentage (inegi 2017)
A	0.2%
B	0.5%
C	1.0%
D	3.0%
E	2.7%
F	13.0%
G	30.0%
H	37.4%
I	5.2%
J	4.9%
K	2.1%

Mexico's government has downplayed the racial connotations of these studies. The 2017 study, besides skin color, also accounted for different socioeconomic factors such as educational achievements and occupational profiles, with media outlets discussing how these findings related to systemic racism, white privilege, and colonialism.

In 2018, the new edition of the ENADIS was published, this time being a joint effort by the CONAPRED and the INEGI with collaboration of the UNAM, the CONACyT and the CNDH. Like its 2010 antecessor, it surveyed Mexican citizens about topics related to discrimination and collected data related to phenotype and ethnic self-identification. It concluded that Mexico is still a fairly conservative country regarding minority groups such as religious minorities, ethnic minorities, foreigners, members of the LGBT collective etc. albeit there are pronounced regional differences, with states in the south-center regions of Mexico having in general notoriously higher discrimination rates towards the aforementioned social groups than the ones states in the western-north regions have. For the collecting of data related to skin color the palette used was again the PERLA one. This time 11.4% of Mexicans were reported to have the "darkest skin tones (A–E)", 59.2% to have "medium skin tones (F–G)" and 29.4% to have the "lightest skin tones (H–K)". The reason for the huge difference regarding the reported percentages of Mexicans with light skin (around 18% lower) and medium skin (around 16% higher) in the relation to previous nationwide surveys lies in the fact that the ENADIS 2017 prioritized the surveying of Mexicans from "vulnerable groups" which among other measures meant that states with known high numbers of people from said groups surveyed more people. In 2023, the 2022 edition of the ENADIS by the INEGI was published, this time 21.1% of Mexicans reported to belong to the "darkest skin tones" (A-E), 49.7% were reported to belong to "medium skin tones (F-G)" and 29.2% were reported to belong to the group of the "lightest skin tones (H-K)". On a similar manner to its predecessor, the survey was conducted with special attention on disadvantaged social groups, meaning that states with a known higher presence of such groups conducted more surveys proportionally.

The following table from a study published in 2018 shows the frequencies of different blood types in various Mexican regions. Prior to the colonial period, Mexico's Amerindian/Indigenous population only had the "O" blood type, which was also present in European colonizers. Blood type does not determine race or ethnicity, and it is not reliable for determining an individual's ancestry.

State	O (%)	A (%)	B (%)	AB (%)
Baja California Norte	60.25%	28.79%	9.03%	1.92%
Sonora	58.58%	30.48%	9.11%	1.84%
Sinaloa	56.46%	32.93%	8.56%	2.05%
Durango	59.29%	26.89%	11.33%	2.50%
Coahuila	66.17%	23.49%	9.01%	1.33%
Nuevo Leon	62.43%	25.62%	10.10%	1.85%
Nayarit	59.20%	29.62%	9.32%	1.85%
Jalisco	57.85%	29.95%	9.78%	2.42%
Michoacan	60.25%	29.51%	9.04%	2.44%
Puebla	74.36%	18.73%	6.05%	0.87%
Veracruz	67.82%	21.90%	8.94%	1.34%
San Luis Potosi	67.47%	24.27%	7.28%	0.97%
Aguascalientes	61.42%	26.25%	10.28%	2.05%
Guanajuato	61.98%	26.83%	9.33%	1.85%
Queretaro	65.71%	23.60%	9.40%	1.29%
State of Mexico	70.68%	21.11%	7.18%	1.04%
Mexico City	66.72%	23.70%	8.04%	1.54%
Total	61.82%	27.43%	8.93%	1.81%

According to the Mexican Social Security Institute (IMSS) nationwide, around half of Mexican babies have the Mongolian spot birthmark.

== Languages ==
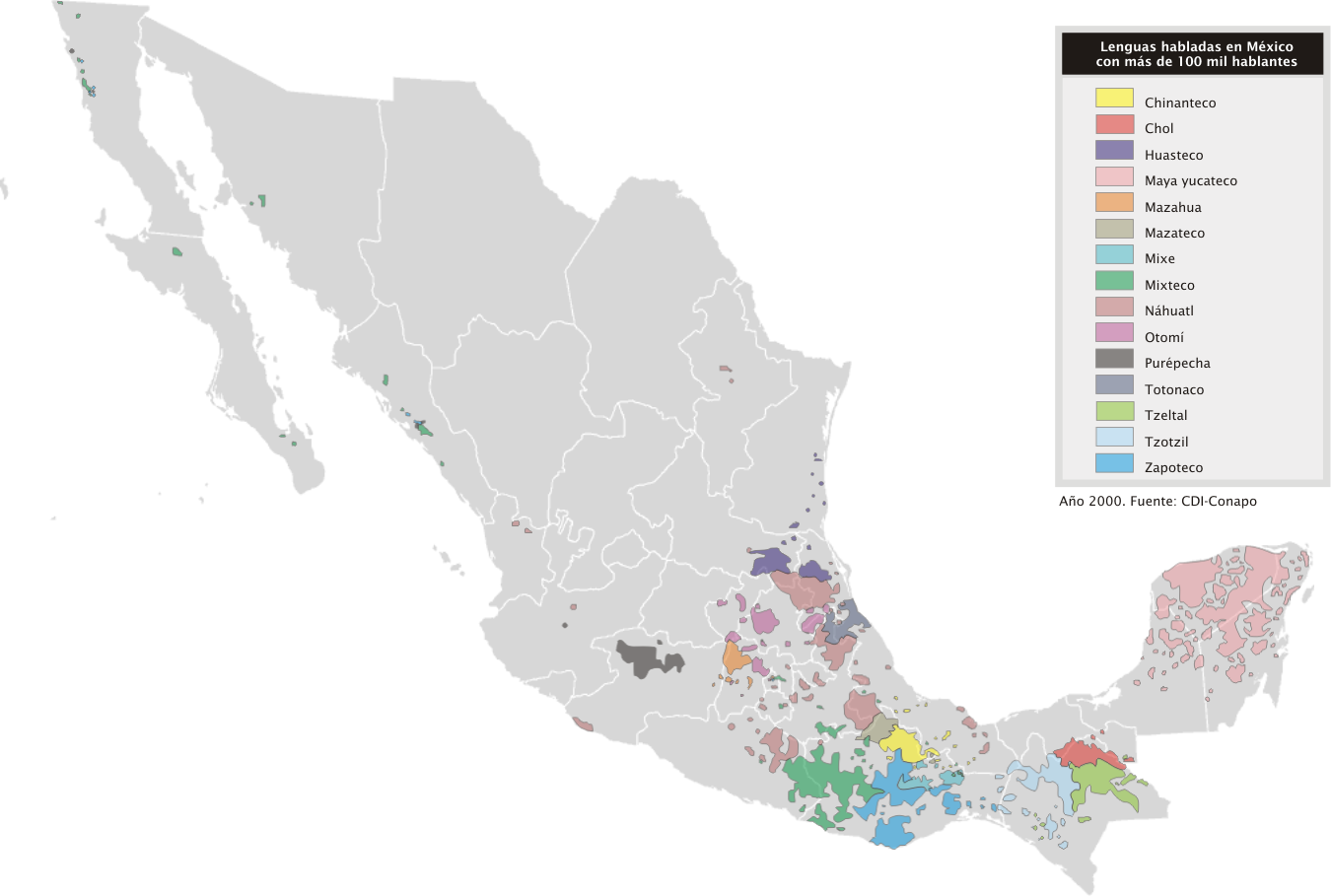
Map for the year 2000 of the indigenous languages of Mexico having more than 100,000 speakers

Mexicans are linguistically diverse, with many speaking European languages as well as various Indigenous Mexican Languages. Spanish is spoken by approximately 92.17% of Mexicans as their first language making them the largest Spanish speaking group in the world followed by Colombia (45,273,925), Spain (41,063,259) and Argentina (40,134,425). The most numerous indigenous language spoken by Mexicans is Nahuatl, which is spoken by 1.7% of the population in Mexico over the age of 5. Approximately 7,364,645 Mexicans (6.1% of the population) speak an indigenous language according to the 2020 Mexican Census. There are also Mexicans living abroad which speak indigenous languages mostly in the United States but their number is unknown. Although the great majority speak Spanish, the second most populous language among Mexicans is English due to the regional proximity of the United States which calls for a bilingual relationship in order to conduct business and trade as well as the migration of Mexicans into that country who adopt it as a second language.

Mexican Spanish is distinct in dialect, tone and syntax to the Peninsular Spanish spoken in Spain. It contains a large amount of loan words from indigenous languages, mostly from the Nahuatl language such as: chocolate, tomate, mezquite, chile, and coyote.

Mexico has no official de jure language, but as of 2003 it recognizes 68 indigenous Amerindian languages as "national languages" along with Spanish which are protected under Mexican National law giving indigenous peoples the entitlement to request public services and documents in their native languages. The law also includes other Amerindian languages regardless of origin, that is, it includes the Amerindian languages of other ethnic groups that are non-native to the Mexican national territory. As such, Mexico's National Commission for the Development of Indigenous Peoples recognizes the language of the Kickapoo who immigrated from the United States, and recognizes the languages of Guatemalan Amerindian refugees.

== Culture ==
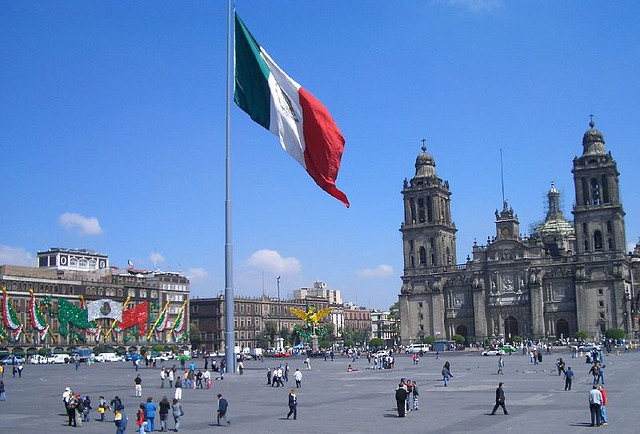
View of Zócalo, Mexico City

Mexican culture reflects the complexity of the country's history through the blending of indigenous cultures and the culture of Spain, imparted during Spain's 300-year colonization of Mexico. Exogenous cultural elements mainly from the United States have been incorporated into Mexican culture.

The Porfirian era (el Porfiriato), in the last quarter of the 19th century and the first decade of the 20th century, was marked by economic progress and peace. After four decades of civil unrest and war, Mexico saw the development of philosophy and the arts, promoted by President Díaz himself. Since that time, as accentuated during the Mexican Revolution, cultural identity has had its foundation in the mestizaje, of which the indigenous (i.e. Amerindian) element is the core. In light of the various ethnicities that formed the Mexican people, José Vasconcelos in his publication La Raza Cósmica (The Cosmic Race) (1925) defined Mexico to be the melting pot of all races (thus extending the definition of the mestizo) not only biologically but culturally as well. This exalting of mestizaje was a revolutionary idea that sharply contrasted with the idea of a superior pure race prevalent in Europe at the time.

=== Literature ===
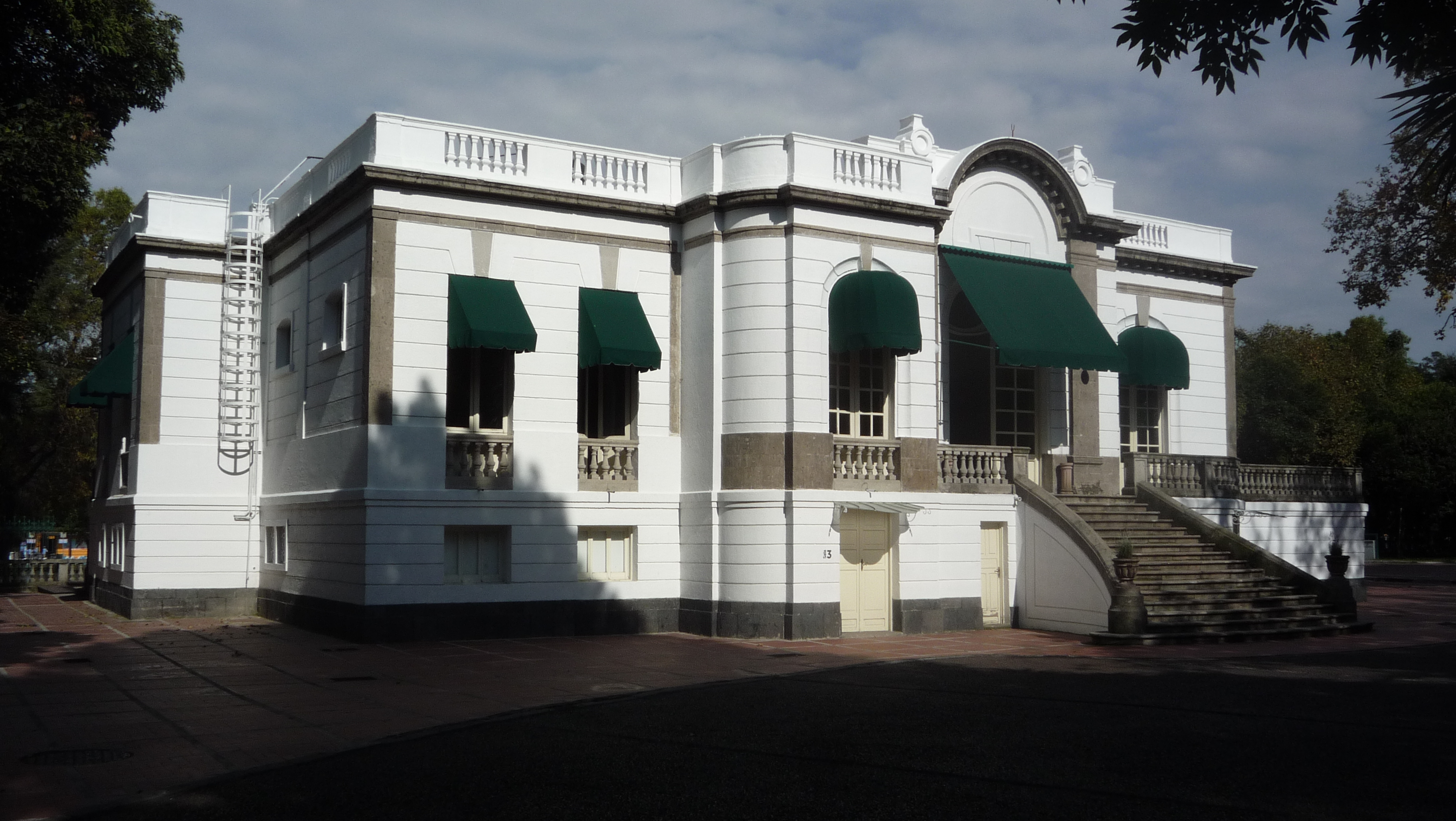
Casa del Lago Juan José Arreola Cultural Center of the National Autonomous University of Mexico.

The literature of Mexico has its antecedents in the literatures of the indigenous settlements of Mesoamerica. The most well known prehispanic poet is Nezahualcoyotl. Modern Mexican literature was influenced by the concepts of the Spanish colonialization of Mesoamerica. Outstanding writers and poets from the Spanish period include Juan Ruiz de Alarcón and Juana Inés de la Cruz.

In light of the various ethnicities that formed the Mexican people, José Vasconcelos in his publication La Raza Cósmica (The Cosmic Race) (1925) defined Mexico to be the melting pot of all races, biologically as well as culturally.

Other writers include Alfonso Reyes, José Joaquín Fernández de Lizardi, Ignacio Manuel Altamirano, Carlos Fuentes, Octavio Paz (Nobel Laureate), Renato Leduc, Carlos Monsiváis, Elena Poniatowska, Mariano Azuela (Los de abajo) and Juan Rulfo (Pedro Páramo). Bruno Traven wrote Canasta de cuentos mexicanos, El tesoro de la Sierra Madre.

=== Science ===
The National Autonomous University of Mexico was officially established in 1910, and the university become one of the most important institutes of higher learning in Mexico. UNAM provides world class education in science, medicine, and engineering. Many scientific institutes and new institutes of higher learning, such as National Polytechnic Institute (founded in 1936), were established during the first half of the 20th century. Most of the new research institutes were created within UNAM. Twelve institutes were integrated into UNAM from 1929 to 1973. In 1959, the Mexican Academy of Sciences was created to coordinate scientific efforts between academics.

In 1995 the Mexican chemist Mario J. Molina shared the Nobel Prize in Chemistry with Paul J. Crutzen and F. Sherwood Rowland for their work in atmospheric chemistry, particularly concerning the formation and decomposition of ozone. Molina, an alumnus of UNAM, became the first Mexican citizen to win the Nobel Prize in science.

In recent years, the largest scientific project being developed in Mexico was the construction of the Large Millimeter Telescope (Gran Telescopio Milimétrico, GMT), the world's largest and most sensitive single-aperture telescope in its frequency range. It was designed to observe regions of space obscured by stellar dust.

=== Music ===
Mexican society enjoys a vast array of music genres, showing the diversity of Mexican culture. Traditional music includes mariachi, banda, Norteño, ranchera, cumbia, and corridos; on an everyday basis most Mexicans listen to contemporary music such as pop, rock, etc. in both English and Spanish. Mexico has the largest media industry in Hispanic America, producing Mexican artists who are famous in Central and South America and parts of Europe, especially Spain.

Some well-known Mexican singers are Thalía, Luis Miguel, Alejandro Fernández, Julieta Venegas and Paulina Rubio. Mexican singers of traditional music are Lila Downs, Susana Harp, Jaramar, GEO Meneses and Alejandra Robles. Popular groups are Café Tacuba, Molotov, RBD and Maná, among others. Since the early years of the 2000s (decade), Mexican rock has seen widespread growth both domestically and internationally.

=== Cinema ===
Mexican films from the Golden Age in the 1940s and 1950s are the greatest examples of Hispanic American cinema, with a huge industry comparable to the Hollywood of those years. Mexican films were exported and exhibited in all of Hispanic America and Europe. María Candelaria (1944) by Emilio Fernández, was one of the first films awarded a Palme d'Or at the Cannes Film Festival in 1946, the first time the event was held after World War II. The famous Spanish-born director Luis Buñuel realized in Mexico, between 1947 and 1965 some of his master pieces like Los Olvidados (1949), Viridiana (1961), and El angel exterminador (1963). Famous actors and actresses from this period include María Félix, Pedro Infante, Dolores del Río, Jorge Negrete and the comedian Cantinflas.

More recently, films such as Como agua para chocolate (1992), Cronos (1993), Y tu mamá también (2001), and Pan's Labyrinth (2006) have been successful in creating universal stories about contemporary subjects, and were internationally recognised, as in the prestigious Cannes Film Festival. Mexican directors Alejandro González Iñárritu (Amores perros, Babel, Birdman), Alfonso Cuarón (Children of Men, Harry Potter and the Prisoner of Azkaban, Gravity, Roma), Guillermo del Toro (Pacific Rim, Crimson Peak, The Shape of Water), Carlos Carrera (The Crime of Father Amaro), and screenwriter Guillermo Arriaga are some of the most known present-day film makers.

=== Visual arts ===
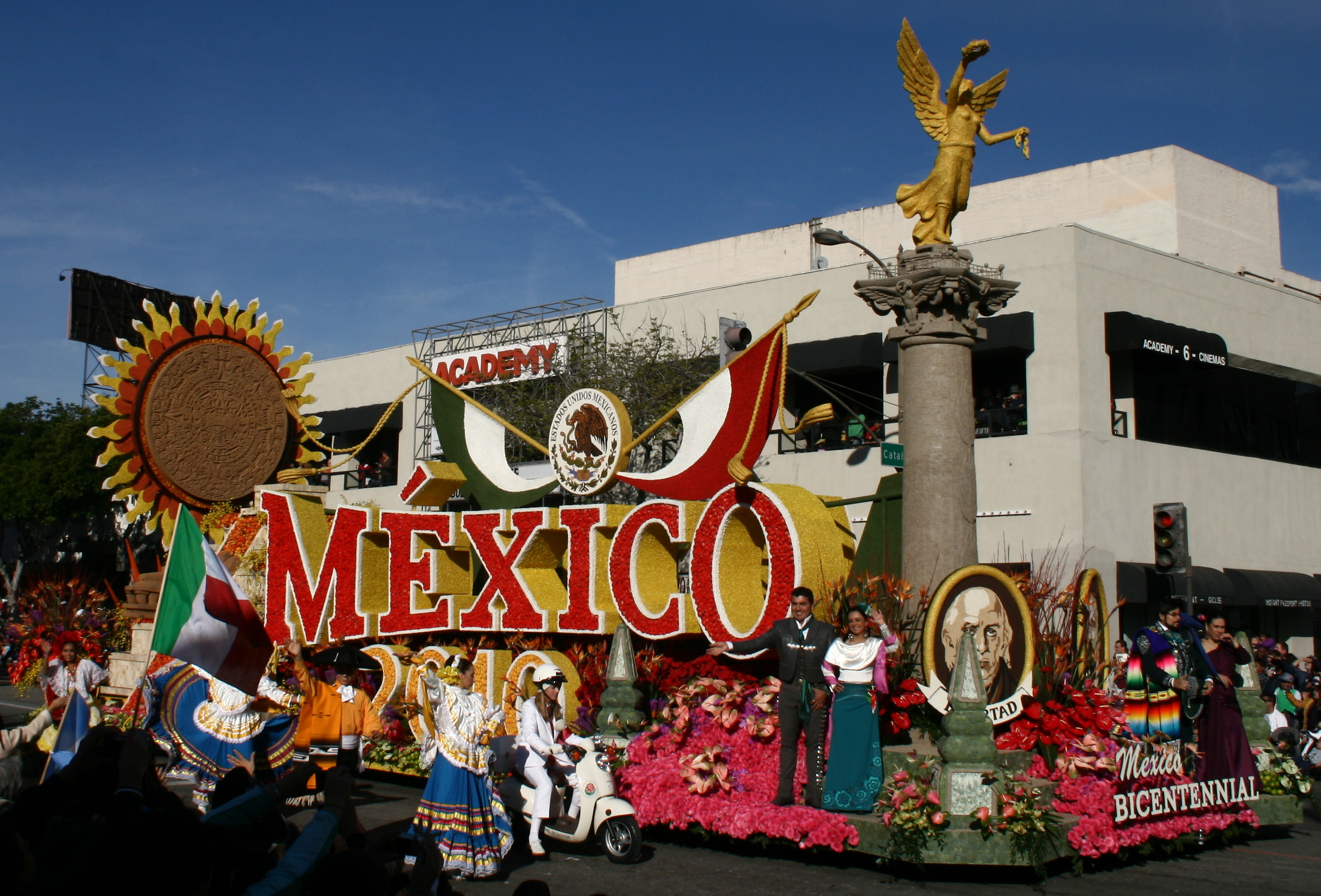
Mexico's commemorative car of the bicentennial of Mexico during the Rose Parade Pasadena (California). January 2010

Post-revolutionary art in Mexico had its expression in the works of renowned artists such as Frida Kahlo, Diego Rivera, José Clemente Orozco, Rufino Tamayo, Federico Cantú Garza, David Alfaro Siqueiros and Juan O'Gorman. Diego Rivera, the most well-known figure of Mexican muralism, painted the Man at the Crossroads at the Rockefeller Center in New York City, a huge mural that was destroyed the next year because of the inclusion of a portrait of Russian communist leader Lenin.

=== Architecture ===
For the artistic relevance of many of Mexico's architectural structures, including entire sections of prehispanic and colonial cities, have been designated World Heritage. The country has the first place in number of sites declared World Heritage Site by UNESCO in the Americas.

=== Cuisine ===
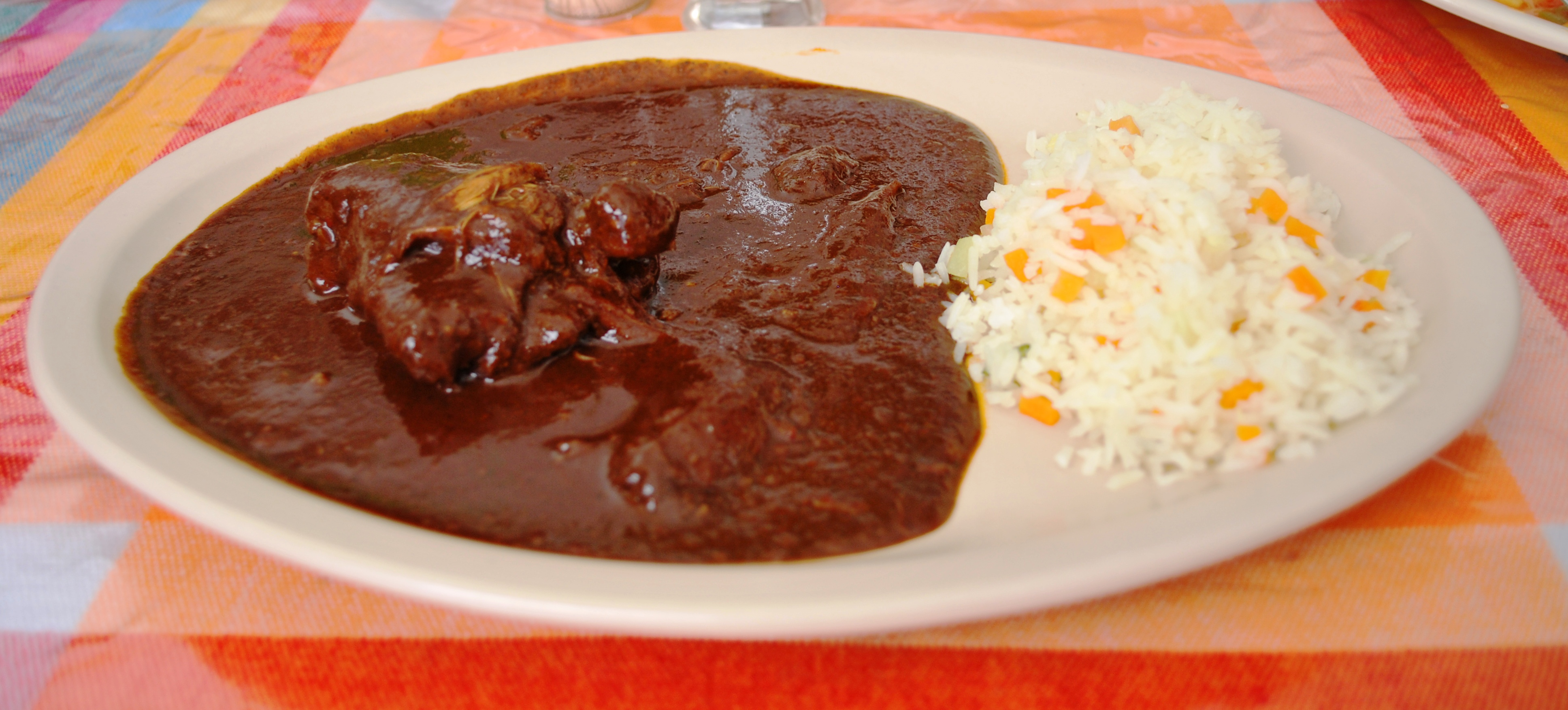
Mole is the national dish of Mexico

Mexican cuisine is influenced by Spanish and indigenous cultures. Mole is the national dish of Mexico. Chocolate and vanilla were discovered by the Aztecs of Mexico. The indigenous peoples of Mexico introduced vanilla, corn, chocolate, sweet potatoes, tomatoes, papayas, chilies, avocados, and pineapples.

=== Holidays ===
The Day of the Dead (Día de los Muertos) is an important Mexican holiday observed by Mexicans. The holiday is influenced by Mesoamerican ritual, European religion and Spanish culture. The holiday traces its roots to the Aztecs and the tradition was first practiced thousands of years ago by indigenous peoples such as the Aztecs and the Toltecs.

== Religion ==
Religion in Mexico (2017)
1. Catholic Church (80.0%)
2. Other Christians (5.00%)
3. Other religions (3.00%)
4. Non-religious (11.0%)
5. Unspecified (1.00%)

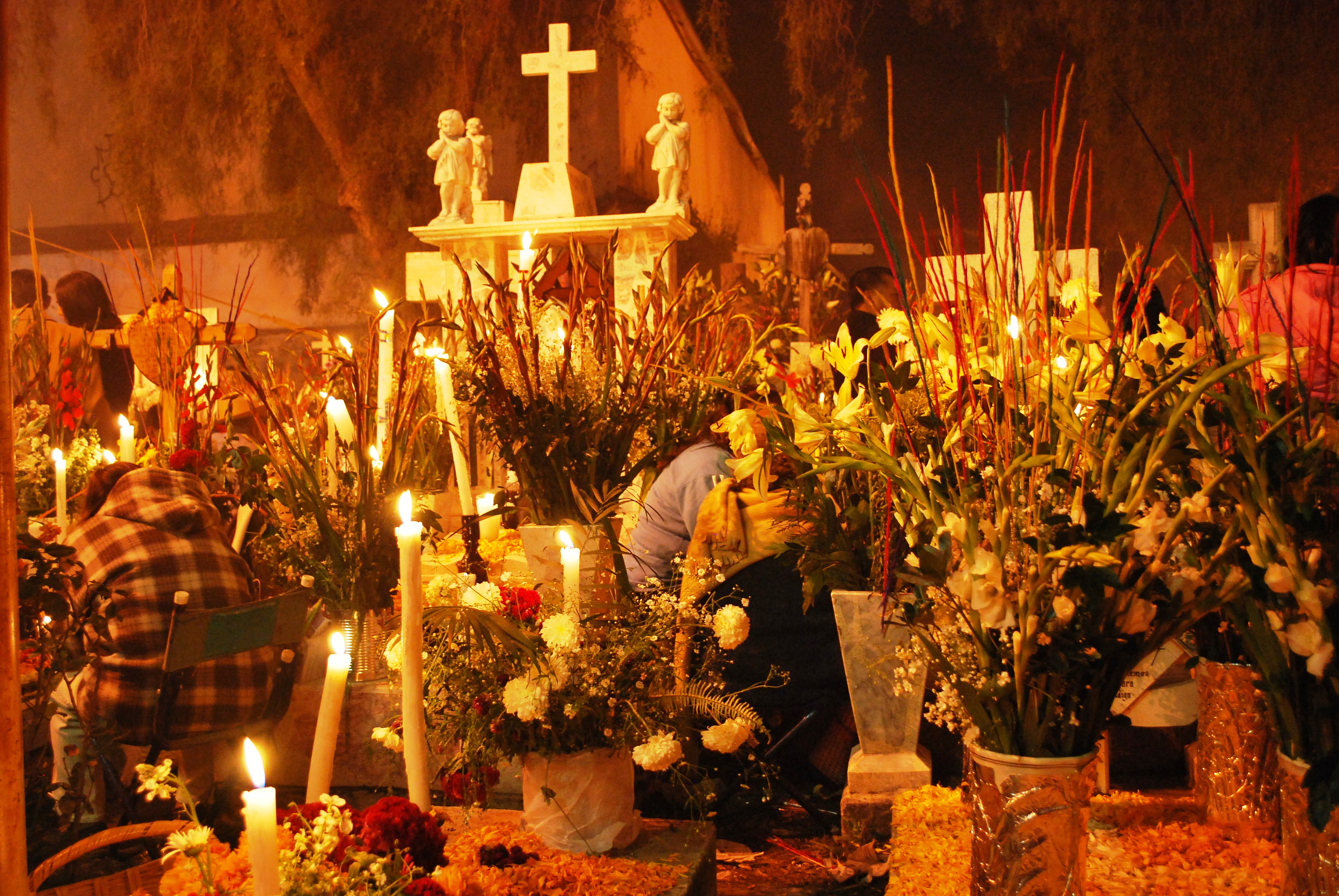
Day of the Dead celebration

Mexico has no official religion, but most Mexicans declare themselves Roman Catholic. Mexico is often seen as a very observant Catholic society. Most Mexicans tend to have opinions that are more in line with Catholic social teaching. Mexico has been resistant to Protestant incursion partly because Protestantism in Mexico has long been associated with the United States, which leads to the reinforcement of Catholicism as part of the Mexican identity.

The Constitution of 1917 imposed limitations on the church and sometimes codified state intrusion into church matters. The government does not provide financial contributions to the church, nor does the church participate in public education. However, Christmas is a national holiday and every year during Easter and Christmas all schools in Mexico, public and private, send their students on vacation.

In 1992, Mexico lifted almost all restrictions on religion, including granting all religious groups legal status, conceding them limited property, and lifting restrictions on the number of priests in the country.

The Catholic Church is the dominant religion in Mexico, with about 80% of the population as of 2017, which is the world's second largest number of Catholics, surpassed only by Brazil. Movements of return and revival of the indigenous Mesoamerican religions (Mexicayotl, Toltecayotl) have also appeared in recent decades.

== Diaspora ==
There is a large Mexican diaspora in the United States. They are concentrated in California and Texas. The Greater Los Angeles area is home to a large Mexican immigrant population. There is also a sizeable Mexican population in Canada, it is home to the next largest population of Mexicans. They also reside in Belize, Spain, Guatemala, and Germany.

== See also ==
- List of Mexicans
- List of Mexican actors
- List of Mexican Americans
- Immigration to Mexico
- Emigration from Mexico
- Chicano
- Pocho
- Mexican cuisine
- Mexican nobility
- Languages of Mexico
- National symbols of Mexico
- Mexican culture
- Criollo people
- Mexican Americans
- Mexican immigration to Spain
- California Mexicans
- Tejano Mexicans
- Hispanics and Latinos
