= Chile–Mexico relations =

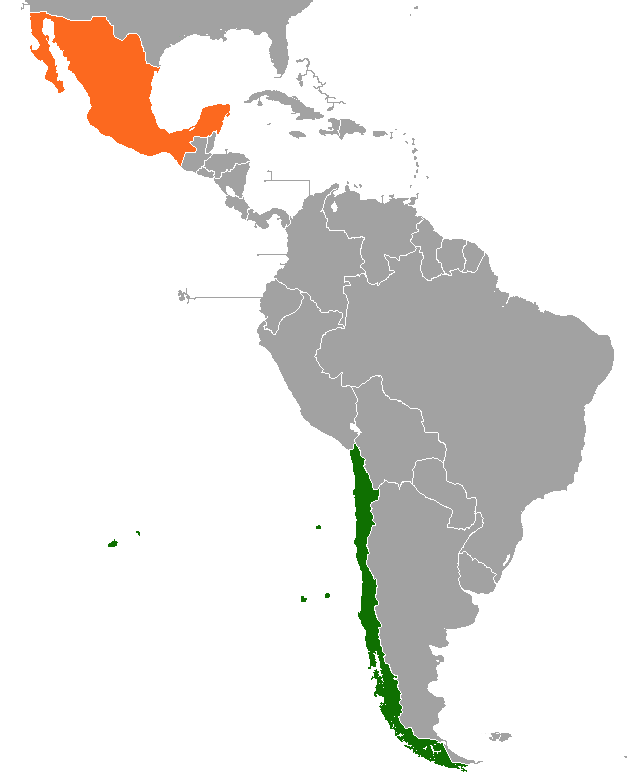

- Chile: Mexico

The nations of Chile and Mexico established diplomatic relations in 1831, however, relations were severed in 1974 in the aftermath of the 1973 Chilean coup d'état. Diplomatic relations were re-established in 1990 and have continued unabated since.

Both nations are members of the Asia-Pacific Economic Cooperation, Community of Latin American and Caribbean States, Latin American Integration Association, Organization of Ibero-American States, Organization of American States, Organisation for Economic Co-operation and Development, Pacific Alliance and the United Nations.

== History ==
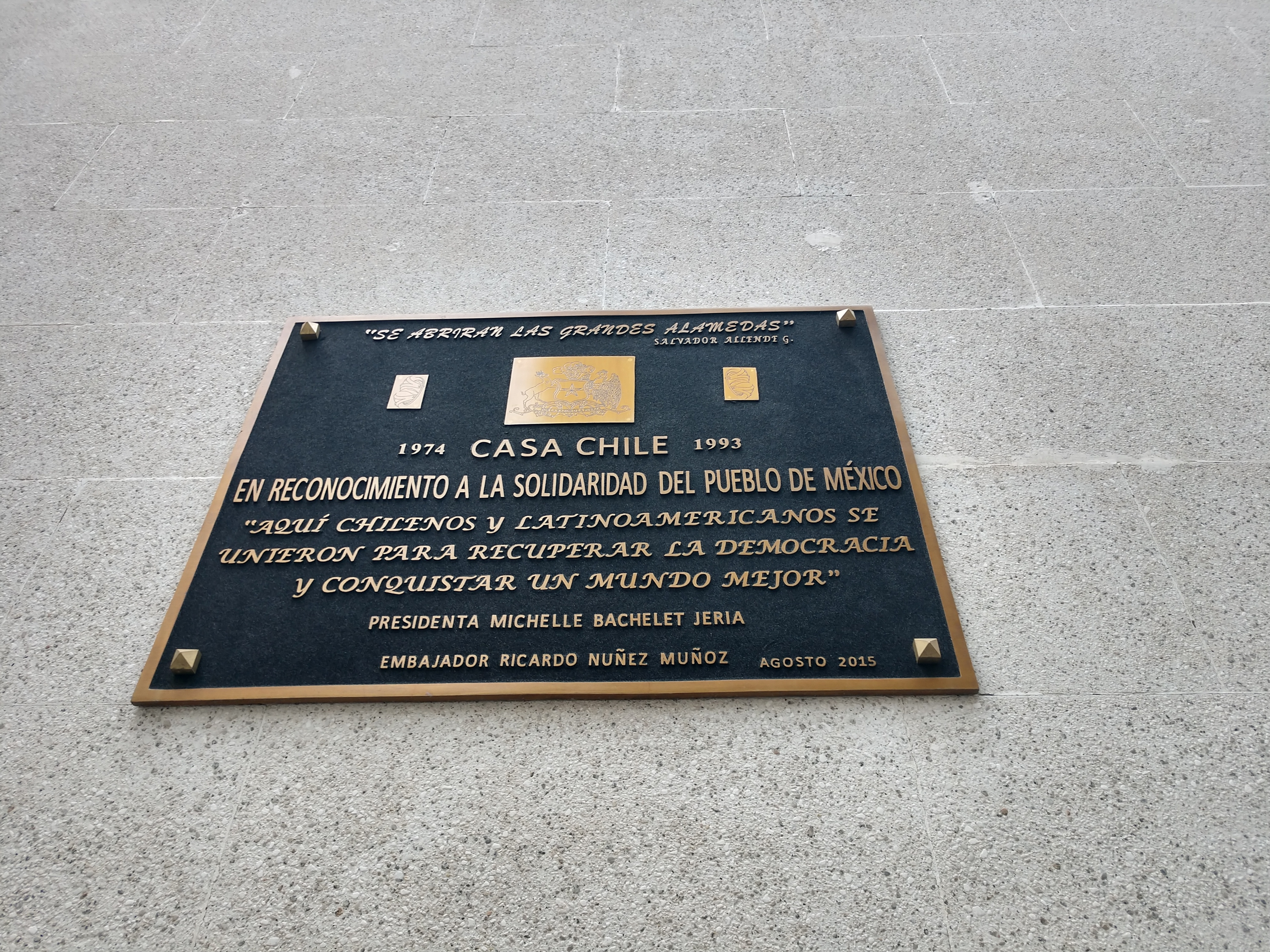
Plaque commemorating Mexican solidarity with Chile during the Military dictatorship of Chile (1973–1990).

Chile and Mexico both share a common history in that they were both hosts to advanced indigenous societies and were both colonized by Spain. Diplomatic relations were established in the 1820s soon after both nations obtained independence from Spain. In 1825 Chile opened a consulate in Mexico City and in Mazatlán in 1875. On 7 March 1831, both nations signed a Treaty of Friendship, Trade and Navigation. In 1844, Mexico opened a consulate in Valparaíso. In 1864, during the Second French intervention in Mexico, Chile recognized and maintained diplomatic relations with the government of President Benito Juárez. In the early 1900s, both nations established resident embassies in each other's capitals respectively.

In 1914, Chile belonged to regional group called the ABC nations (which also included Argentina and Brazil). These three nations made up the richest and most influential nations in South America at the time. That year, the ABC nations intervened in a diplomatic dispute between the United States and Mexico who were on verge of war over the Tampico Affair and the subsequent occupation of Veracruz by US forces. The ABC nations meet with representatives of the United States and Mexico in Niagara Falls, Canada to ease the tension between the two nations and to avoid war, which afterwards did not occur.

In 1960, President Adolfo López Mateos became the first Mexican head-of-state to pay a visit to Chile. In 1972, President Salvador Allende paid a visit to Mexico. On 27 November 1974, Mexican President Luis Echeverría Álvarez severed diplomatic relations with Chile a year after the unconstitutional removal and death of elected President Salvador Allende by General Augusto Pinochet. For the next fifteen years, Mexico would receive thousands of Chilean refugees who fled the dictatorship of Pinochet. Both nations re-established diplomatic relations on 23 March 1990. Since the re-establishment of diplomatic relations, both nations have increasingly become closer with regards to bilateral relations and trade.

Chile and Mexico are two of four Latin American countries who are members of the OECD (the others being Colombia and Costa Rica), and both nations are two of the four founding members of the Pacific Alliance (the others being Colombia and Peru). In March 2018, Mexican President Enrique Peña Nieto traveled to Chile to attend the inauguration of President Sebastián Piñera.

In November 2022, Chilean President Gabriel Boric traveled to Mexico and met with President Andrés Manuel López Obrador. During the visit, both leaders discussed the election of a new head for the Inter-American Development Bank and to increase bilateral relations and agreements between both nations.

In September 2023, Mexican President Andrés Manuel López Obrador paid a visit to Chile to commemorate the 50th anniversary since the 1973 Chilean coup d'état. President López Obrador met with Chilean President Gabriel Boric and the two leaders discussed both nations close relations and President Boric thanked Mexico for its involvement in granting political asylum to thousands of Chileans during the 1973 coup d'état. In October 2024, President Boric travelled to Mexico to attend the inauguration of President Claudia Sheinbaum.

In July 2026, Chilean Foreign Minister Francisco Pérez Mackenna paid a visit to Mexico and met with his counterpart Roberto Velasco Álvarez. During the visit, both foreign ministers reaffirmed their commitment to further strengthening the bilateral relationship and they welcomed the modernization of the Free Trade Agreement between Mexico and Chile.

== High-level visits ==
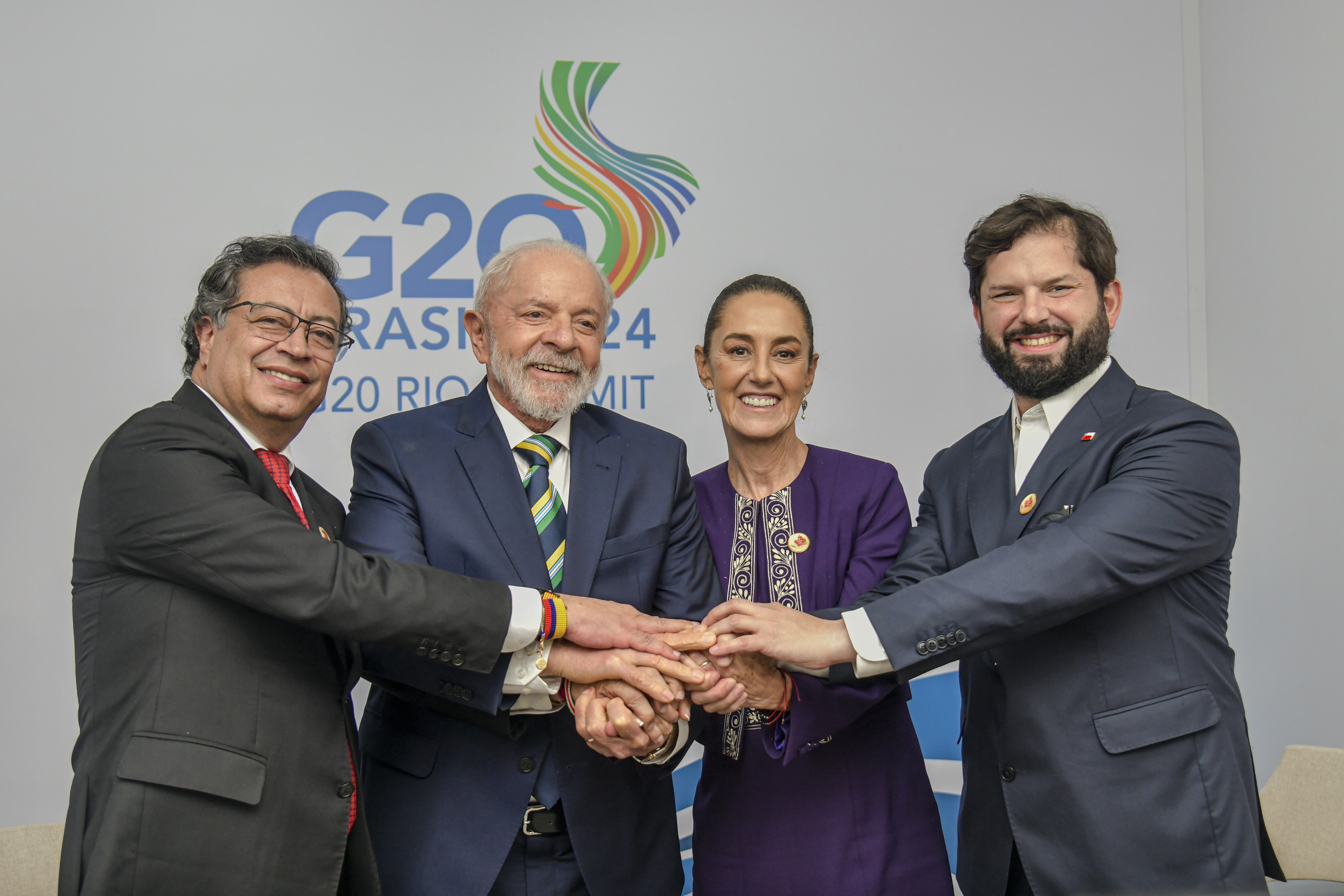
Chilean President Gabriel Boric and Mexican President Claudia Sheinbaum (among other leaders) at the G20 Summit in Rio de Janeiro, Brazil, November 2024.

Presidential visits from Chile to Mexico

- President Jorge Alessandri (1962)
- President Salvador Allende (1972)
- President Patricio Aylwin (1990, 1992)
- President Eduardo Frei Ruiz-Tagle (1991, 1995)
- President Ricardo Lagos (2002, January & September 2004, 2005)
- President Michelle Bachelet (2007, 2009, 2010, 2014, 2015)
- President Sebastián Piñera (July & December 2011, 2012, 2018)
- President Gabriel Boric (2022, 2024)

Presidential visits from Mexico to Chile

- President Adolfo López Mateos (1960)
- President Luis Echeverría (1972)
- President Carlos Salinas de Gortari (1990, 1991, 1993)
- President Ernesto Zedillo (1996, March & April 1998)
- President Vicente Fox (2001, 2004, 2006)
- President Felipe Calderón (2008, 2012)
- President Enrique Peña Nieto (2013, 2016, 2018)
- President Andrés Manuel López Obrador (2023)

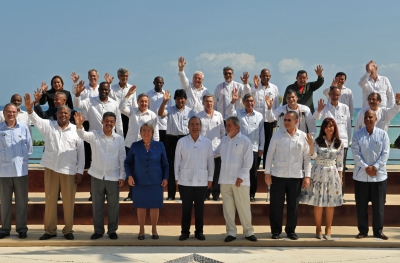
President Felipe Calderón and President Michelle Bachelet in Cancún; 2010.

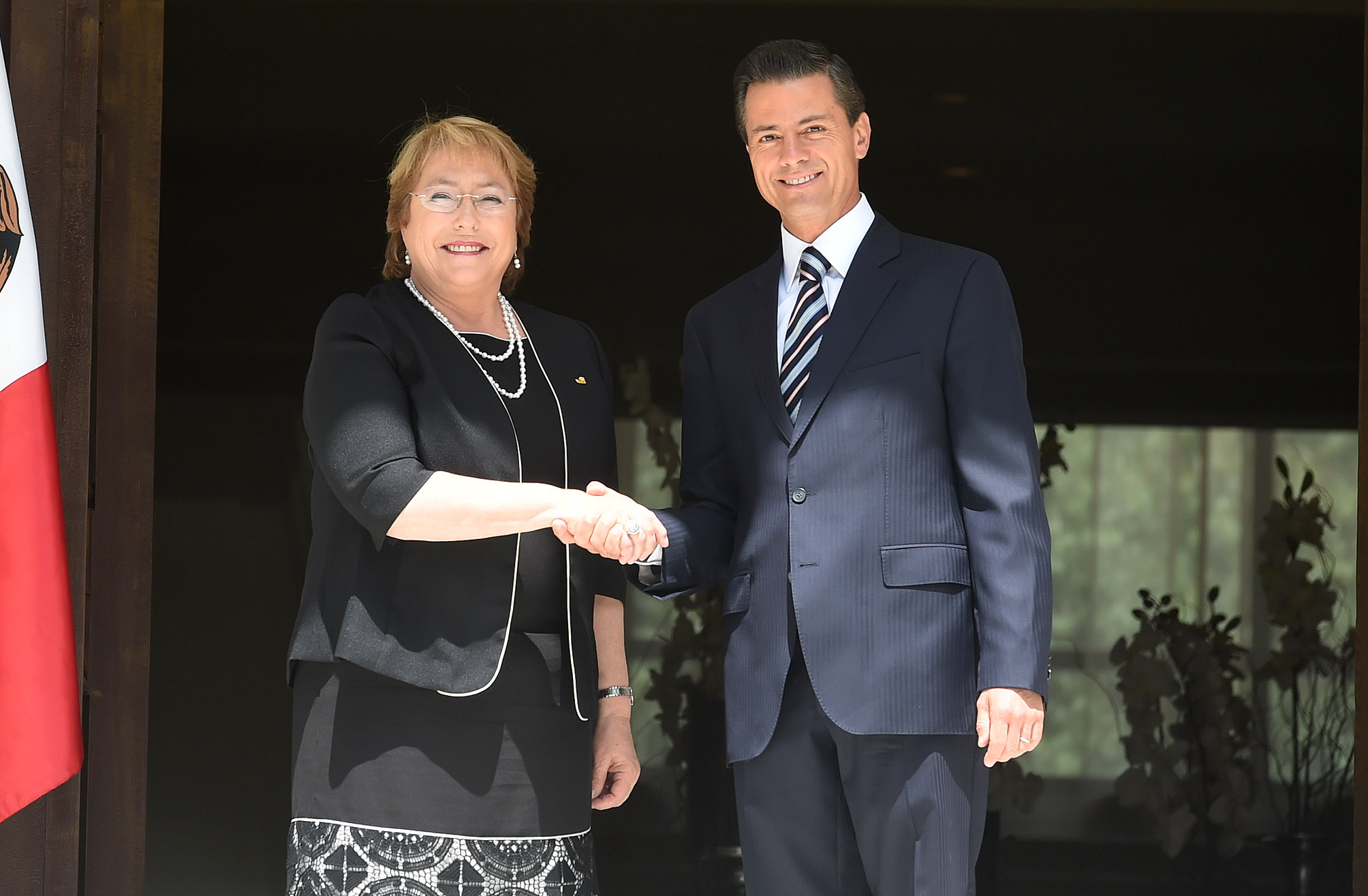
President Michelle Bachelet and President Enrique Peña Nieto in Mexico City; 2015.

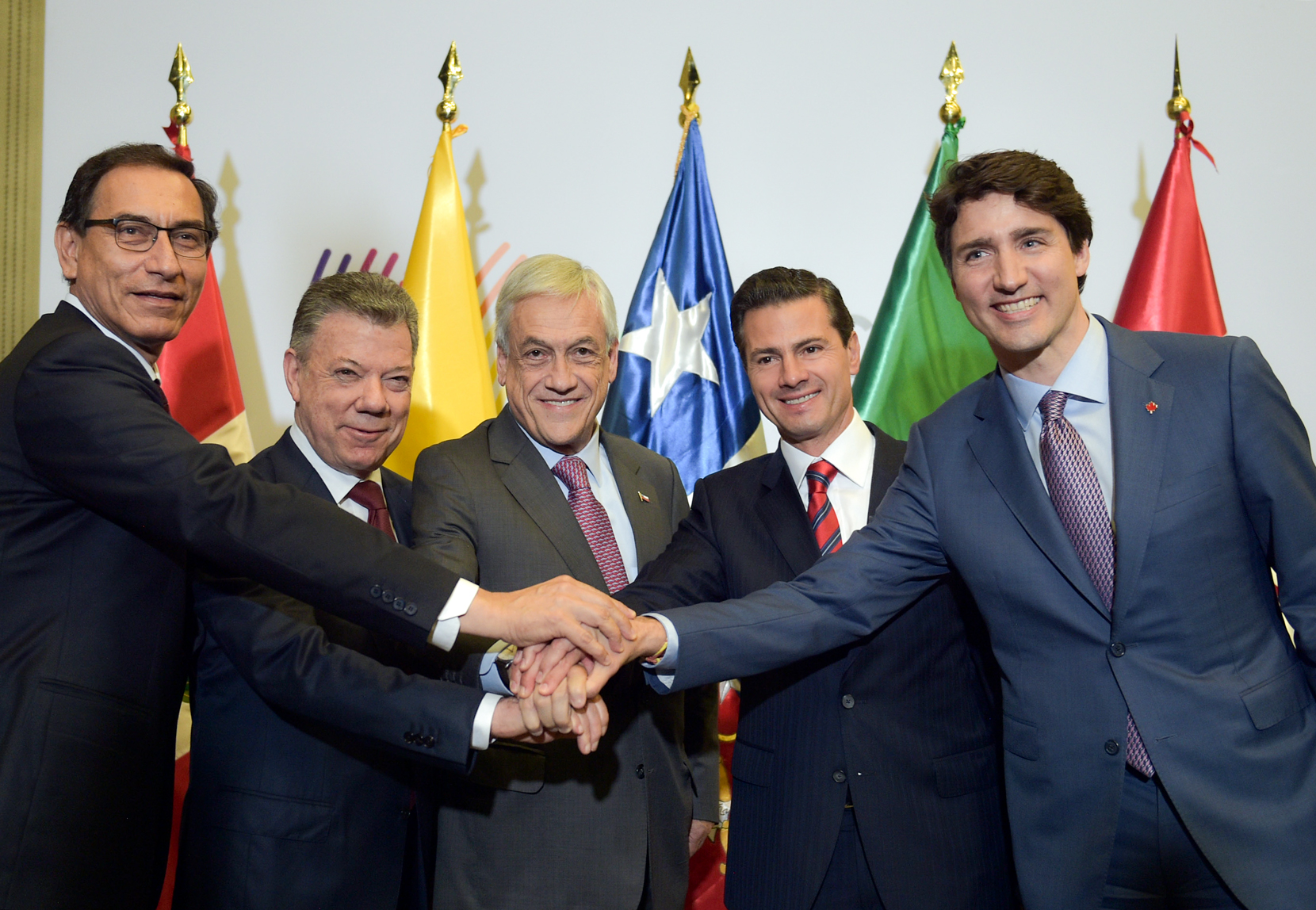
President Enrique Peña Nieto and President Sebastián Piñera in Lima, Peru; 2018.

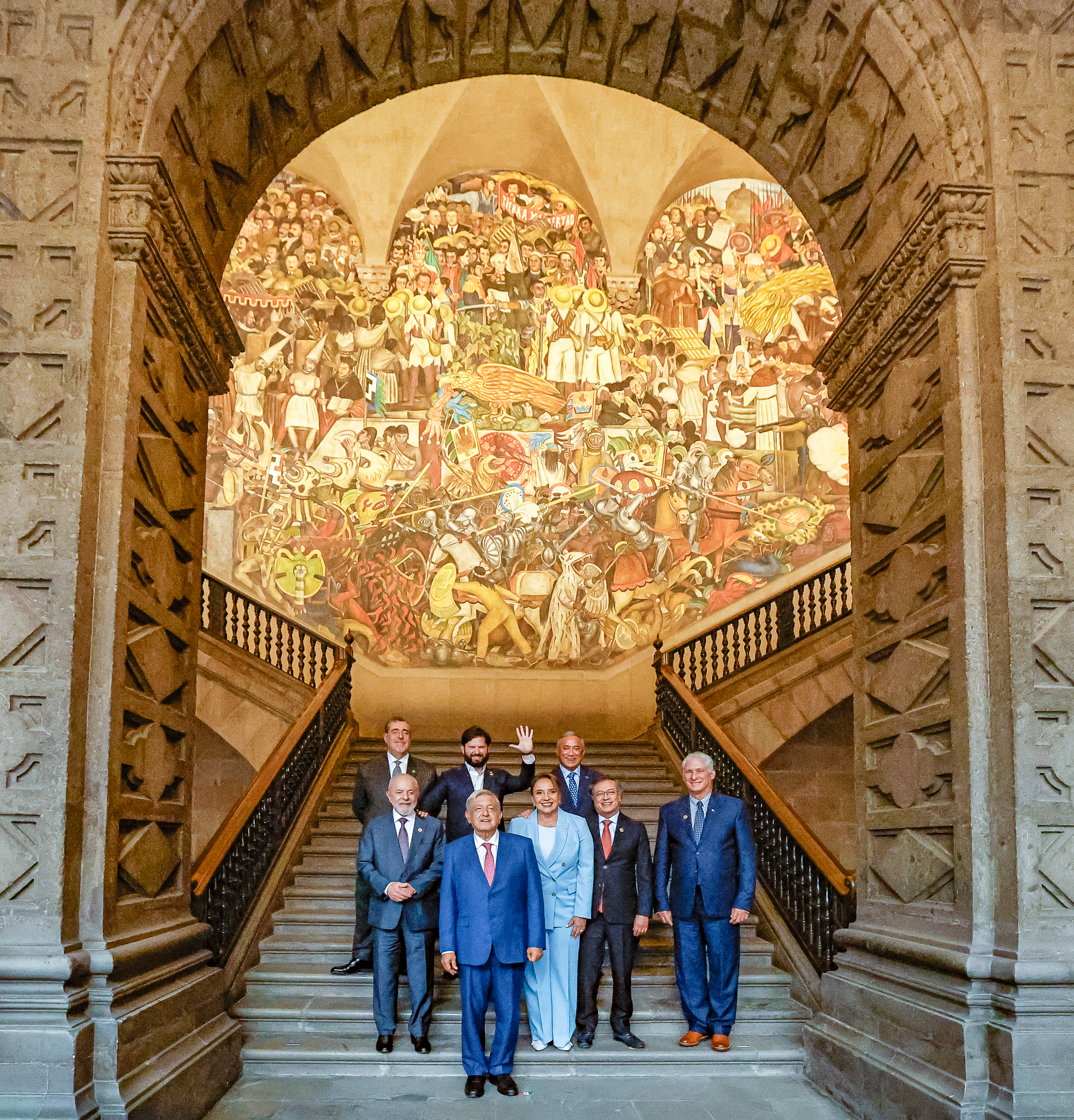
President Gabriel Boric and President Andrés Manuel López Obrador (and other leaders) in Mexico City; October 2024.

== Bilateral agreements ==
Both nations have signed numerous bilateral agreement such as an Extradition Treaty (1990); Agreement for Mutual Legal Assistance in Criminal Matters (1990); Agreement for Cultural and Educational Cooperation (1990); Agreement on Technical and Scientific Cooperation (1990); Agreement of Cooperation to Combat Drug Trafficking and Drug dependency (1990); Agreement for Touristic Cooperation (1993); Agreement on Air Transportation (1997); Free Trade Agreement (1998); Agreement to Avoid Double Taxation and Prevent Tax Evasion on Income and Equity (1998); Agreement for Strategic Association (2006); Agreement of Protection and Restitution of Cultural Property (2011); and an Agreement of Cooperation, Mutual Administrative Assistance and Exchange of Information in Customs Matters (2011).

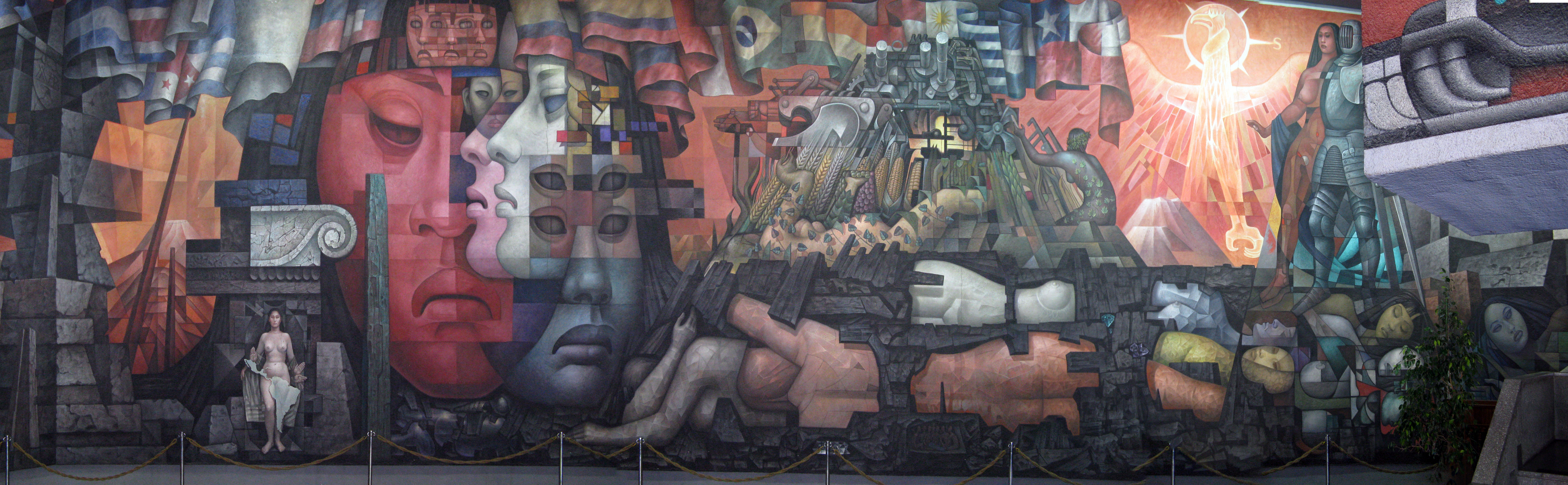
The mural Presencia de América Latina, painted by Mexican artist Jorge González Camarena painted in the lobby of the Casa del Arte of the University of Concepción in Chile.

== Transportation ==
There are direct flights between Chile and Mexico with Aeroméxico and LATAM Airlines.

== Trade relations ==
Both nations signed a free trade agreement in April 1998 and both nations are also signatories to the Trans-Pacific Partnership. In 2022, trade between Chile and Mexico totaled US$3.8 billion. Chile's main exports to Mexico include: lumber, plywood, salmon, peaches, cheese, wine and copper. Mexico's main exports to Chile include: automobiles and parts, tractors, electronics, machinery and beer.

Several Mexican multinational companies such as América Móvil, Farmacias Similares, Grupo Alsea, Grupo Bimbo, Mabe and OXXO (among others) operate in Chile. Chilean Startups companies such as Fintual, Betterfly and NotCo (among others) operate in Mexico.

== Resident diplomatic missions ==
- Chile has an embassy and a consulate-general in Mexico City.
- Mexico has an embassy in Santiago.
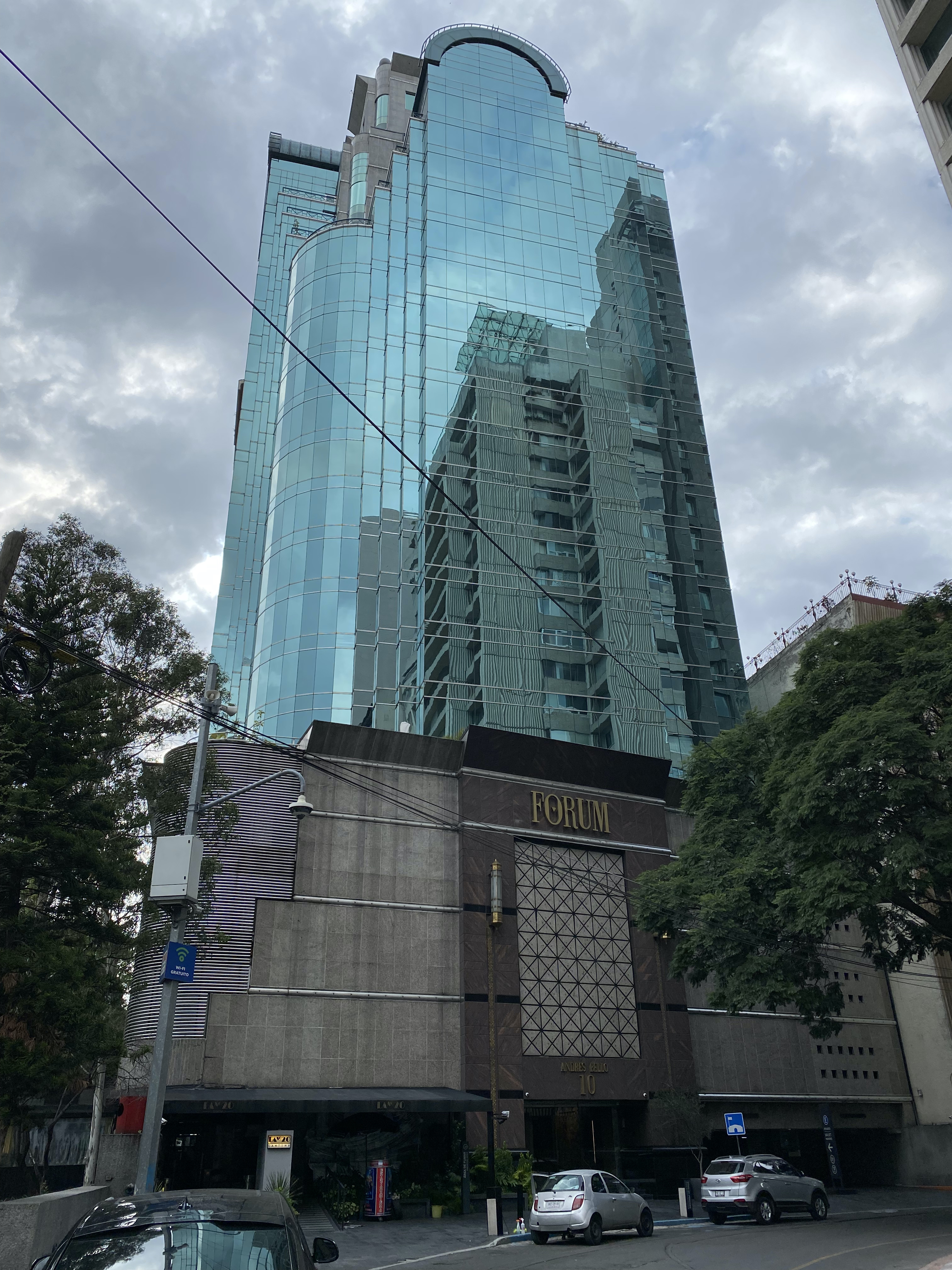
Building hosting the Embassy of Chile in Mexico City

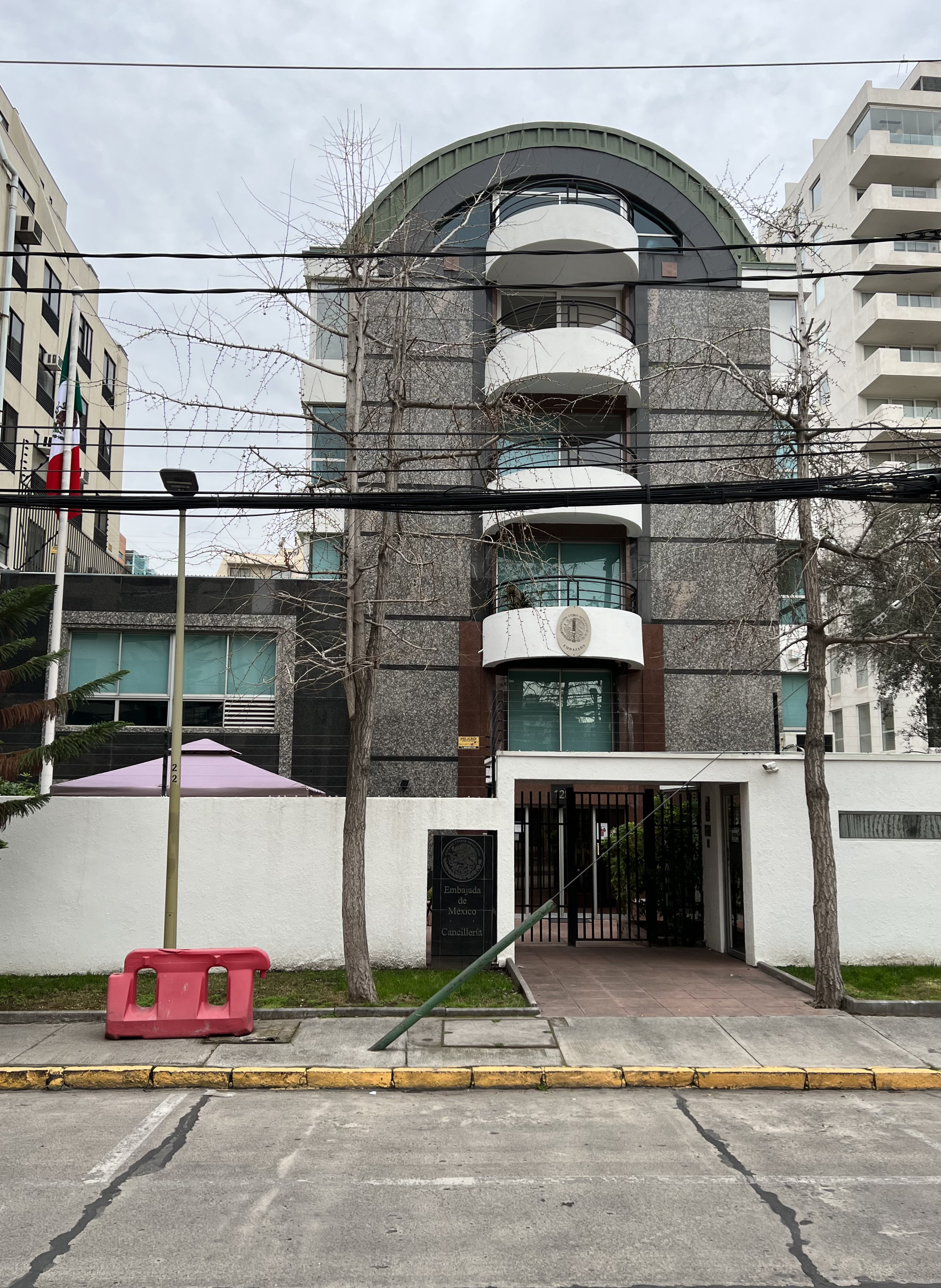
Embassy of Mexico in Santiago

== Gallery ==
Residence of the Ambassador of Mexico in Santiago

The Chilean ships Rancagua (LST-92) and Sargento Aldea (LSDH-91) sailing alongside the Mexican ship ARM Usumacinta during Partnership of the Americas (2014)

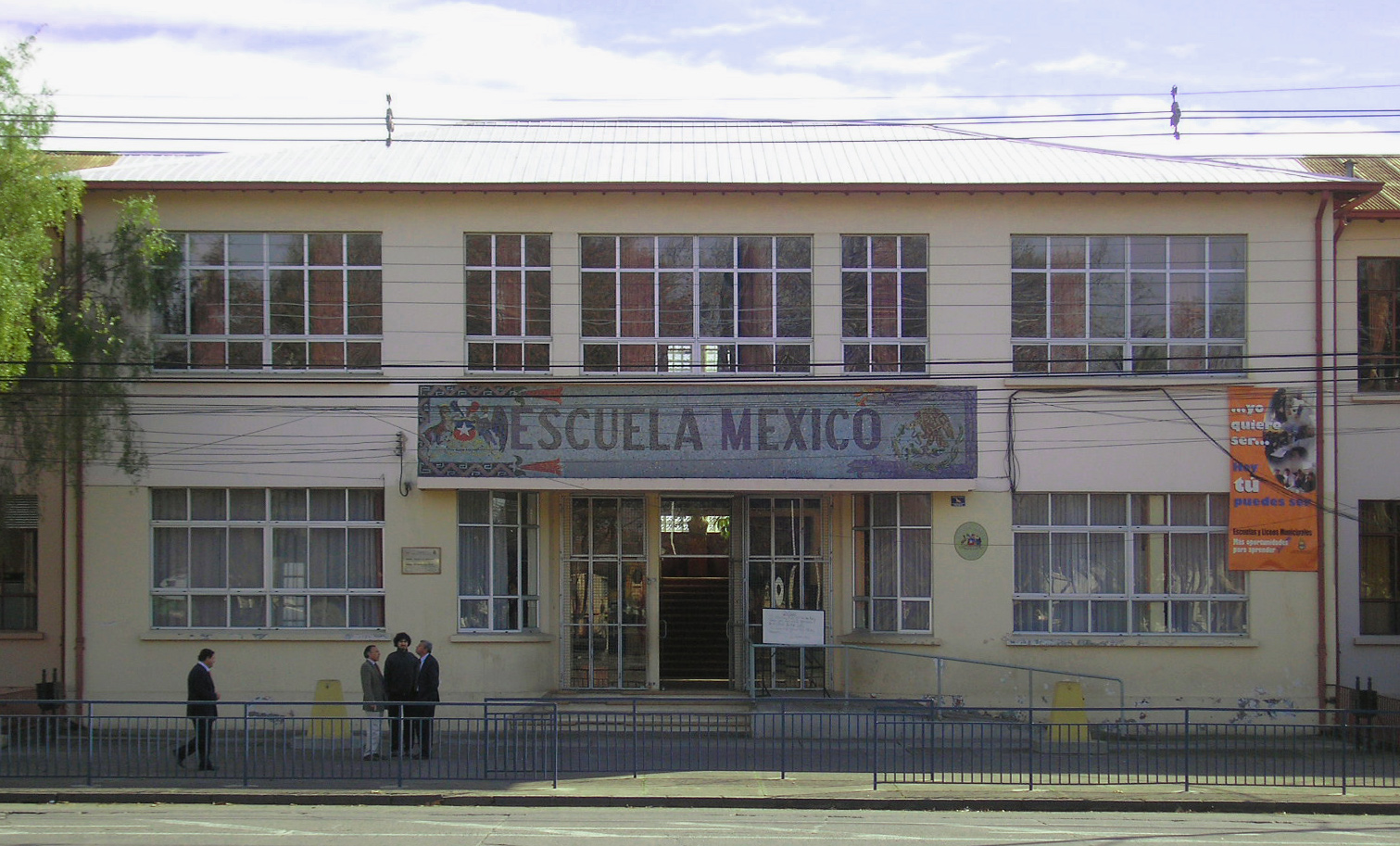
Primary school in Chillán, Chile named after Mexico

Plaza México in Viña del Mar

Statue to Salvador Allende in Mexico City

== See also ==
- Chilean Mexicans
- Chile–Mexico Free Trade Agreement
- Mexican immigration to Chile
- Mexican music in Chile
