= Radio Agricultura =

Radio broadcasting network in Chile

- Santiago, Chile; Chile
- Frequency: 92.1 MHz (Santiago)

Programming
- Format: News/Opinion

Ownership
- Owner: Sociedad Nacional de Agricultura

History
- First air date: October 15, 1936

Technical information
- Class: FM
- Transmitter coordinates: 33.42904°S 70.62115°W

Links
- Website: radioagricultura.cl

Radio Agricultura (originally Radio Sociedad Nacional de Agricultura) is a Chilean radio broadcasting network belonging to the association of landowners, Sociedad Nacional de Agricultura (SNA). It is run by Publicaciones y Difusión SA (which is owned by the SNA), the studios are at Edificio Pamplona.

It was founded in 1935 in Valparaíso and inaugurated on October 30, 1936 in Santiago de Chile. Its concession goes back to Decree No. 3633 of August 30, 1935, subsequently published in the Diario Oficial on September 11, 1935. It takes a conservative editorial line.

== History ==
The SNA decided to create a means of making its activities known to the public. Beginning the project in Valparaiso in 1935, on October 15, 1936, in Santiago, radio transmissions began at a frequency of 570 kHz on the Medium wave band.

Radio Agricultura was influential in making Mexican music popular in rural areas of Chile. Radio Agricultura won notoriety and influence because, it opposed the government of Salvador Allende and supported the military coup and later military dictatorship of Augusto Pinochet. Its transmissions were famous for their coverage of the coup of September 11, 1973 and its military bands that were heard on national radio and television throughout Chile. Also in the 1970s the dictatorship shut down smaller radio stations thought to be sympathetic with the former Allende administration.

At the end of the 1990s, Radio Agricultura began broadcasting at 92.1 MHz in the FM band, the frequency of its sister radio station Radio San Cristóbal FM.

As the only station with which provincial radio stations can affiliate, Radio Agricultura uses agreements with other radio stations, in addition to a network of transmitters throughout Chile, to broadcast across the country. Other, larger radio stations (such as Radio Bío-Bío, Radio Cooperativa, ADN Radio Chile and Tele13 Radio) have national channels with their own stations.

Radio Agricultura has among its ranks several public figures, including Alejandro de la Carrera (press director until March 2014), Joaquín Lavín, Fernando Villegas, Cecilia Pérez, Sergio "Checho" Hirane, and Eli de Caso among others.
