= Mexican music in Chile =

Music and musical traditions of Mexico expressed in Chile

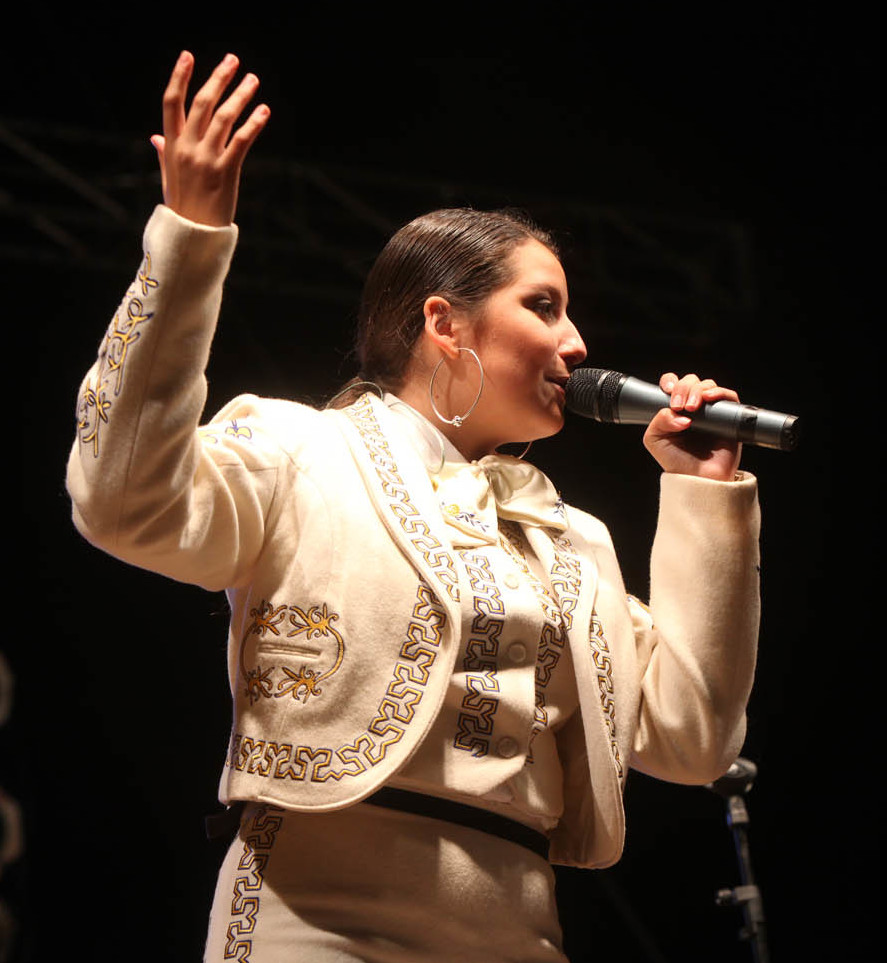
María José Quintanilla, a Chilean singer of ranchera.

Mexican music enjoys widespread popularity in some social and geographic sectors of Chile. In particular, Mexican music is especially popular among Chilean rural lower classes. Geographically, Mexican music is most popular in south-central Chile, but there are also significant listeners elsewhere, such as in the northern city of La Serena. Mexican corridos are commonly performed in Chilean national day celebrations such as Fiestas Patrias.

Mexican music in Chile includes norteño music, a series of styles that originated in the rural northern half of Mexico, as well as the corrido and ranchera genres; all of them are collectively referred as "Mexican music" in Chile. Though other regional styles of Mexican music are represented in Chile, similarly to the Regional Mexican radio format and genre in the United States.

Among the annual Mexican music festivals in Chile are the Festival del Cantar Mexicano Guadalupe del Carmen in Chanco, Festival Internacional de la Voz de la Música Mexicana de Puyehue in Puyehue, and Festival del Cantar Popular Mexicano in La Serena.

== Origins ==
It is thought that Mexican music gained popularity, even in remote areas of Chile, through radio stations and Mexican movies. The first Chilean interpreters of Mexican music appeared in the 1940s, and by the time of Jorge Negrete's visit to Chile in 1946, Los Queretaros and many other ensembles specializing in Mexican music were thriving. Musicologist Laura Jordán González comments that "music listening practices in Chile have extensively shown a preference for foreign music, which has been explained by some authors as a result of successive non-protectionist policies".

Radio stations specializing in Mexican music are common in Chile. They may play music from as early as six o'clock in the morning, when farmers begin their workday. Typically, broadcasts of Mexican music on these radio stations continue well into midnight. In the 1950s and 1960s, non-specialized radio stations such as Radio Yungay and Radio Agricultura created programs dedicated to Mexican music. According to lifelong Mexican music collector Fernando Méndez, the popularity of Mexican music was helped by similarities in Chilean and Mexican culture, such as the equivalence of the charro with the huaso.

[In the 1940s, Chile and Mexico] were nations with similar agricultures, in [both] countries people worked from sunrise to sunset, and there was a liking for horses.

Spanish original: [En la década de 1940, Chile y México] eran naciones con agriculturas similares, en los países se trabajaba de sol a sol, y había un gusto por los caballos

— Fernando Méndez

== 1970s to the present ==
As Mexican music gained ground in Chile by the 1970s, the popularity of the corrido was considered to be on par with the local cueca, a local genre regarded as typically Chilean and promoted by the Pinochet dictatorship. As happened in many aspects of Chilean society, Mexican music became politicized in the 1970s. Jorge Inostroza, a prominent radio host and promoter of Mexican music, alienated much of his audience with his public support of the Pinochet dictatorship. The military dictatorship sought to isolate Chilean radio listeners from the outside world by changing radio frequency to middle wavelengths. This, together with the shutdown of radio stations sympathetic to the former Allende administration, had a negative impact to Mexican music in Chile. Another challenge to Mexican music was the closing of record shops selling Mexican music which coincided with the installment of the dictatorship in the early 1970s.

In response to these adversities, Chilean exiles in Spain and Mexico supplied their relatives in Chile with records of Mexican music. The scarcity of Mexican music records is thought to have contributed to the creation of the local recording company Sol de América and the pirate cassette brand Cumbre y Cuatro, both of which catered to Mexican music enthusiasts. Elements of the Chilean military distrusted Mexican music, leading to cases where the music was denounced as "communist". The military's dislike of Mexican music may be rooted in the Allende administration's close links with Mexico, the "Mexican revolutionary discourse", and the overall low prestige of Mexican music in Chile. The dictatorship never suppressed Mexican music as a whole, as distinctions were made between different currents, some of which were actually promoted.

Among the Chilean upper class, Mexican music has gained more acceptance since the 2000s. In part, this trend is explained by the popularity of the musical talent show Rojo Fama contra Fama on TVN, which aired for the first time in 2002. María José Quintanilla in particular gained acclaim on the program by singing ranchera songs.
