= Whitexican =

Pejorative term

Whitexican is a pejorative term used in Mexico to refer to white-skinned Mexicans who usually have social and economic advantages, and who allegedly "are not aware of the prevailing system of inequalities in Mexico and believe that all Mexican citizens have the same opportunities." The term became popular on social media in the late 2010s. Since then, it has been the subject of interest among journalists and academics due to the discourses motivated by racial inequality in Mexico.

== Origin and use of the term ==
According to Nexos, the term emerged on Twitter at least in 2008. It was popularized in 2018 by posts from the Twitter account LosWhitexicans. Alfonso Forssell Méndez, writing for Nexos, states that the expression "whitexican" alludes to a social order inherited from the colonial caste system, where those who can be identified as European descendants enjoy a set of economic and social advantages. Forssell Méndez points out that the neologism, as a compendium of expressions and attitudes common among the Mexican upper classes, highlights a contrast between the "citizen of the world" stance of the "whitexican" and their conservative political positions.

Journalists and academics have commented that the term criticizes the belief that Mexican society, as a result of mestizaje, is in some way "post-racial". Regarding the cultural persistence of racism, the Sociologist Mónica Moreno, a professor at the University of Cambridge, has highlighted the evocation of mestizaje as a way to minimize racism in the country. "In Mexico, mestizaje is the ideal subject of the nation. But with mestizaje, they want to eliminate certain things and emphasize others. It is a mixture that wants to erase the indigenous and highlight the white, [the term whitexican] not as a mockery of the white mestizo for their skin color, but as a reproach to those who benefit from injustice and do nothing to correct the error."

== Controversy ==
The use of the term sparked controversy during the release of Michel Franco's 2020 film New Order. Franco argued that his film depicted "reverse racism" and singled out the word "whitexican" as "deeply racist." The director later apologized, saying he was unaware of the impact of his use of the term. On social media, critics of the term have claimed that it promotes animosity and social division.
