= Racism in Mexico =

Racism in Mexico has a long history. It is understood to be inherited from the caste system of the colonial period. However, this was not a rigid system, nor explicitly about race. In general today, people who are darker-skinned, including Black and Indigenous Mexicans, make up nearly all of the peasantry and working classes, while lighter-skinned Mexicans – many being criollo, directly of Spanish descent – are in the ruling elite. "According to INEGI, skin color continues to be a factor in social stratification... with lighter skin color, [there are] more opportunities to have better paid jobs and better managerial positions."

Additionally, racism and xenophobia are closely linked in Mexico. There are a number of historic and recent examples that include legally barring certain nationalities and ethnicities entry into the country, insensitive treatment and stereotyping of other races, and the notorious 1911 Torreón massacre of a Chinese community.

== History ==
=== Colonial Mexico ===
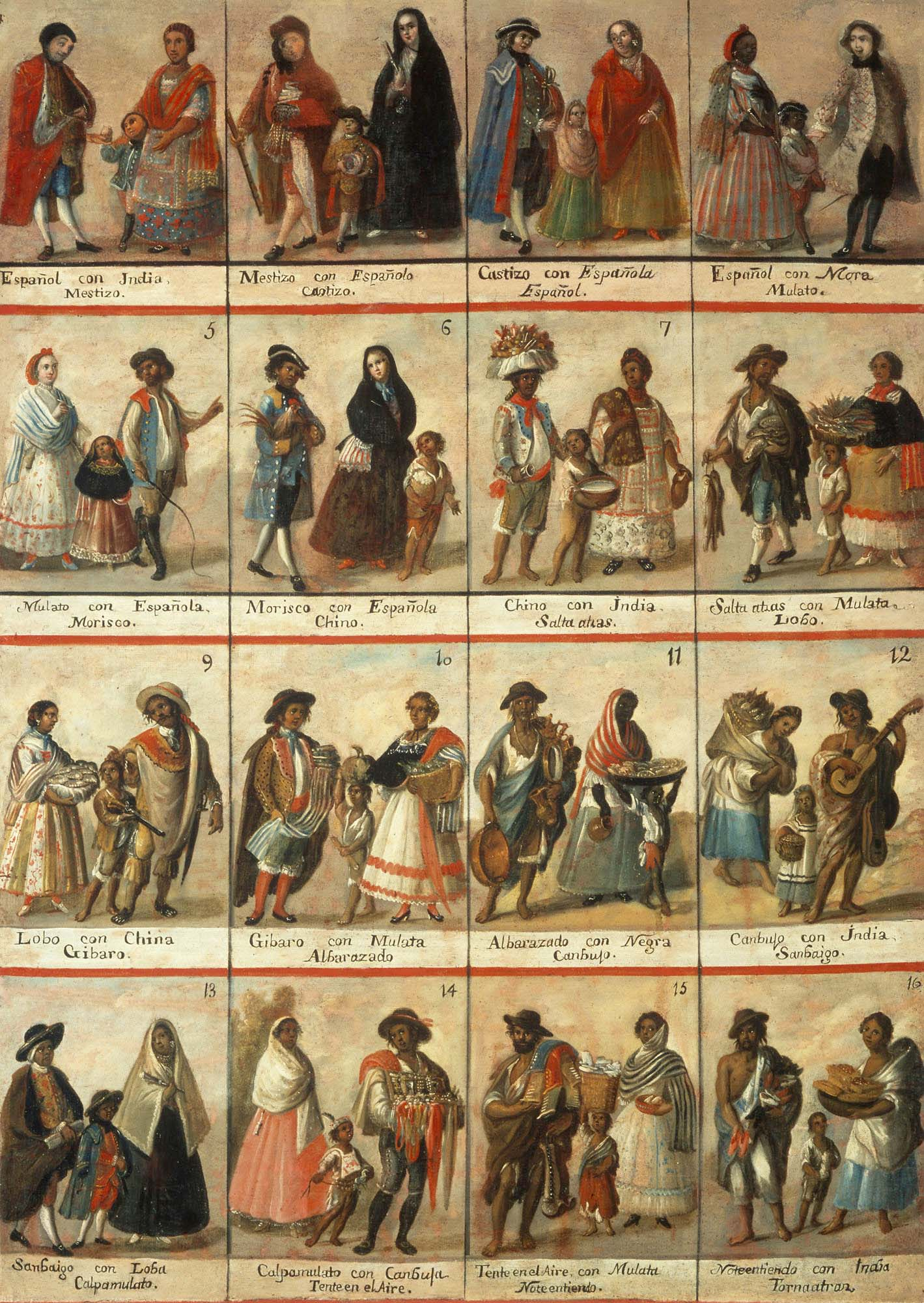
Spanish Castas Painting.

For many, the Spanish caste system is the main antecedent of the phenomenon of discrimination in Mexico. The different colonial institutions established exclusion protocols based on blood purity. Spanish blood was considered the most dignified, while African blood was the least valuable.

According to Federico Navarrete, doctor in Mesoamerican Studies from the National Autonomous University of Mexico (UNAM), the Indigenous people were the great population base of America and therefore they were the base of the economic system, the white Spaniards occupied the privileged positions of the political and economic structure, while the Indians had to work and pay tributes and taxes to the crown, and at the lowest level were the blacks, who only lived to work as slaves. Mestizos held a position below the Spanish, but above Indians and Blacks. The caste system grew from that and took on its own nomenclature to refer to the different mixtures of European, Indigenous, and African blood.

For Navarrete, the use of all these distinctions actually had more to do with practical purposes and social standing, more than with the modern conception of racism (which only emerged in the early nineteenth century) so the terms 'caste' should not be confused with 'race'. After several centuries of colonialism, constant miscegenation reached the point that it was not possible to distinguish between 'pure bloods' and mestizos. The legacy of this is that "associations between socioeconomic status and racialized traits" are imbedded into Mexican society and culture to this day.

=== Racism in the Porfiriato ===
The Porfiriato was a period in the history of Mexico in which the general and politician Porfirio Díaz was president of the country. This period was between 1877 and 1911 and was characterized by the Porfirian policies called "order and progress" and "bread or stick". It was a period of overall economic growth. However, this was at the cost of the exploitation of Indigenous and other marginalized groups. In this period, the haciendas had their peak. The peasants were mostly Indigenous and black. The landowners were generally white, wealthy, foreigners. Due to the exploitation of workers and peasants, several strikes occurred throughout the country at that time, but the most important were those in Río Blanco and Cananea. The social consequence that had the most impact on racism during that time was perhaps the Caste War, in which the Mayan Indigenous people rebelled against the white and mestizo population of Yucatán. There was also the exile of the Yaquis Indians from their native Sonora, in the northwest of the country, to the state of Yucatán, in the Mexican southeast, which caused the Battle of Mazocoba. Some authors suggest that racism during the Porfiriato was due to an exacerbated Mexican nationalist sentiment and to the Europeanization of Mexican culture, especially a systematic Frenchification.

The constant exploitation of Indigenous people, the seizure of their lands, the long dictatorial period of General Porfirio Díaz, and the general discontent led to the outbreak of the 1910 Mexican Revolution. México Bárbaro ('Barbarian Mexico') was an extensive series of articles published by The American Magazine to publicize the human slavery that was practiced during the final years of the dictatorship of Porfirio Díaz in places like Yucatán and Valle Nacional in Mexico.

== Contemporary Mexico ==
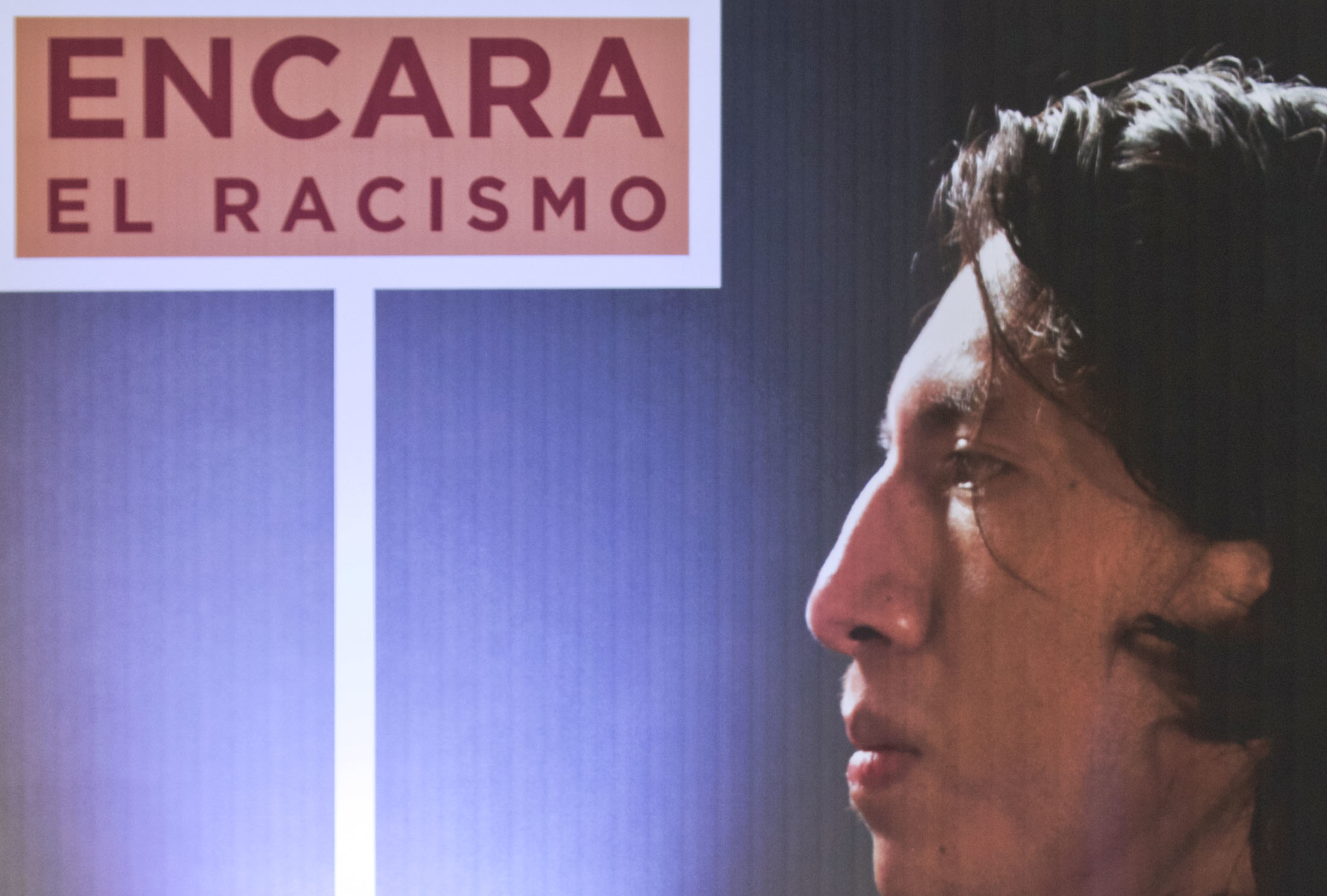
"Face Racism" poster

After the Independence of Mexico in 1821, and after the proclamation of the Constitution of 1824, "indigenous peoples lost their special colonial status, and accompanying protections, as wards of the government."

According to the National Council to Prevent Discrimination (CONAPRED), Indigenous people, homosexuals and blacks, are the most discriminated groups in Mexico. In the words of the researcher Alexandra Haas, "in Mexico, unlike what happens in other countries such as the United States, racism affects a population majority instead of a privileged minority."

The National Council to Prevent Discrimination is a Mexican government agency only created in 2003.

According to the National Council for the Evaluation of Social Development Policy (CONEVAL), 71% of Indigenous people live in poverty. While CONAPRED confirms that the majority of people who consider themselves Afro-descendants live in situations of marginalization and poverty. According to the census, the Afro-Mexican population is made up of 1,300,000 people. Only in 2019 was this identity, Afro-Mexicans, constitutionally recognized; its first official count was done for the 2020 census.

According to INEGI, skin color continues to be a factor in social stratification. According to the results of the first Intergenerational Social Mobility Module, the lighter the skin color, the more opportunities there are to get better paying jobs and managerial positions. The national discrimination survey conducted by INEGI in 2017 shows that 3 out of 10 respondents believe that the country's Indigenous population is poor due to their culture. In addition, five out of 10 people belonging to an ethnic group declared that, in the past five years, they were denied access to health services. These premises can be applied to different categories, such as schooling, employment and wealth. With which it can be concluded that in Mexico ethnic origin functions as a social and economic determinant, despite the fact that there is no longer an institution that regulates it. However, there are notable exceptions as most of the poor in the rural north of Mexico are White (called "güeros de rancho", something akin to white trash), whilst in Southern Mexico – particularly in the states of Yucatán and Chiapas – Amerindians and Mestizos make up a large part of the upper class.

In 2020, after George Floyd's murder in the United States, actor Tenoch Huerta brought the issue of racism in Mexico to the table through social networks, which caused a controversy with actor Mauricio Martínez, who was accused of misogyny and racism.

== Racism against Indigenous people ==
In Mexico, around 25 million people consider themselves Indigenous, although only 7 million people speak Indigenous languages. Nevertheless, in Mexico, one can see racism and discrimination against the different Indigenous peoples who live mainly in rural areas of the country. Indigenous peoples are commonly depicted as poor, backwards, or 'lower' than the rest of the population due to their skin tone, physical features, manner of dress, language, traditions and customs.

40.3% of the Indigenous population have felt discriminated against, 2.9 million Indigenous people have expressed that they have been denied rights and services. Among these are medical services and the delivery of medicines, followed by the denial of social services, lack of attention in government offices and job opportunities. 20.3% of the Indigenous population feel that they have been discriminated against at work or school, as well as on the streets and public transportation. 24% of the Indigenous population affirms that they have been excluded in social activities; forms of exclusion range from insults and looks of contempt, to threats and shoves.

The Indigenous population suffers from more precarious conditions than the rest of the population. 71% of the Indigenous population is in a state of poverty. The two states with the largest Indigenous population in the country; Chiapas and Oaxaca are the two states with the most poverty, with 76.4% and 66.4% of the poor population respectively, indigenous people are four times more likely to be poor. Likewise, illiteracy in the Indigenous population is higher than the rest, 76.7% of the Indigenous population can read and write, compared to 93.6% of the non-Indigenous population, Furthermore, the education of the Indigenous population is lower, 21.3% of the Indigenous population has no education, compared to 5% of the rest of the population, only 4.9% of the entire Indigenous population receives higher education, with the likelihood of achieving that level of schooling is six times lower for the Indigenous population. Job opportunities are fewer, and the Indigenous population has less relevant jobs. They are paid less and around 14.8% of the Indigenous working population does not receive a salary, and only 1.7% are the employers.

== Anti-Asian sentiment ==
There has been a history of Anti-Chinese (antichinismo) sentiment and policy in Mexico. Jason Chang authored the 2017 book titled Chino: Anti-Chinese Racism in Mexico, 1880-1940, which discusses antichinismo in detail. After a lead up of racist attacks, again under Porfirio, in 1911 there was a massacre of 303 Chinese in Torreón. During the Second World War, Japanese residents were put under surveillance, movement was restricted, and some were expelled. There is a 2009 book on the topic titled The War Against the Japanese in Mexico (La guerra contra los japoneses en México) by Galindo Sergio Hernández. Asians in Mexico regularly deal with petty stereotypes and mocking. During the COVID-19 pandemic an upswing in racial abuse has been documented against Chinese and all Asians in Mexico.

== Afro-Mexicans ==
Mexico was a major trading point in the Atlantic Slave Trade. 2.5% population of Afro-Mexicans still exist today in Mexico. In Southern Mexican towns near Belize, where the Afro-Mexican population is larger, there is a general negative attitude towards people of African descent.

== White Mexicans ==
Whitexican is a term used to refer to white-skinned Mexicans who usually have social and economic advantages, and who allegedly "are not aware of the prevailing system of inequalities in Mexico and believe that all Mexican citizens have the same opportunities." Critics of the term have called it an example of "reverse racism" toward white people, who are a minority in the country.

== Racism and immigration ==
Beginning in the late 1800s and continuing into the first decades of the 20th century – before and after the 1910 Revolution – xenophobic resentment towards immigrants manifested itself in different ways in official legislation. After the brutal treatment of the Indigenous during the Porfiriato, a new nationalism rose on the basis of a majority ethnic composition, the Mestizo race. Fundamentally, this was an anti-colonial project to create national unity. Measures to preserve the ethnic composition of Mexico aimed to curtail an influx of migrants of the "fundamentally different" Western and Chinese peoples. There were limits put on immigration despite the very low total numbers of immigrants living in Mexico at that time. Boats were inspected before leaving China to prevent the "dregs of humanity" from being sent over. There were huge numbers of European immigrants at the time of the First World War, but most Europeans did not come to Mexico, normally opting for the US, also Argentina or Brazil. Those that did migrate to Mexico – along with the Chinese – were considered infectious, degenerate, and poisonous to the Mestizo race, and therefore the nation. In 1924 African-Americans and Afro-Cubans were explicitly restricted from immigrating, and in 1927 Eastern Europeans, Turkish, and Middle Eastern people were also considered "undesirable". Later in the 1930s prohibitions on "undesirable races" like "black, yellow, Malaysian and Hindu" people, as well as against Jews, and gypsies, were implemented.

=== Xenophobia against Central American migrant caravans ===
At the end of 2018, a series of migrant caravans of Central Americans, made up mostly of Honduran migrants and to a lesser extent South Americans, crossed the southern border of Mexico, heading for the United States. The government of Mexico repressed a large part of the migrants through the use of force, after which Donald Trump congratulated the Mexican government, while many others succeeded in their mission and entered Mexican territory. Those who managed to cross the border were given support, asylum, visas, and work for those immigrants who stayed in Mexico. However, this generated a wave of xenophobic comments, especially through social networks, by Mexicans who disagreed with the empathatic measures that had been taken, arguing things such as "I am not racist but ... first you have to help ours", "there is no work for everyone", "they are not going to cross, they are going to stay and they are only going to bring more violence", and more.

In a march called to protest against the policies of the incoming government of President Andrés Manuel López Obrador, the attendees also protested against migration. Photos of people carrying banners that said: "No more undesirable immigrants" were circulated online. There are also political parties in Mexico using racist and anti-immigrant slogans and speeches against foreigners, to reinforce the sentiment of Mexican nationalism. The most extreme xenophobic expressions were made by the Movimiento Nacionalista Mexicano (Mexican Nationalist Movement), a group that linked immigrants with criminals from the Mara Salvatrucha.

In 2020, the border with Guatemala was closed. On the same topic, one academic shares that: "in Latin America there is pigmentocracy, if you are a güero [light skinned] you are on the side of prosperity... and even goodness. Many of the Central Americans are Afro-descendants and that makes them undesirable. Otherwise they would be very well received."

=== Other instances ===
Spanish immigrants were common from the late 19th century until 1950 and experienced xenophobia and hispanophobia. They were blamed for many of the problems in Mexico from the late 1800s on, and they were equated with being rich, or as landlords, while also being seen as benefiting from "privileged immigration". Besides obviously La conquista, this was directly related to the earlier 'open door' policies for European investment of Porfirio Díaz.

Stereotypes, both positive and negative, about foreigners persist in Mexico. There are a number of cases of the "rejection" of white foreigners, yet it is downplayed because they are seen as symbolic representatives of countries Mexico has a colonial or military history with. White people, especially tourists, regularly experience overcharging, or what is known as the white tax.

== Racist language used in Mexico ==
The use of racist terms and phrases in Mexico is common, but due to how accepted the expressions are, many do not realize they are rooted in racist thinking. For example, it is often said when a Mestizo person of a darker-skinned tone marries a Mestizo person of a lighter skinned-tone, they are "making the race better" ("Están mejorando la raza."). The term Malinche (or Malinchismo) is used when a Mexican woman likes or dates a white man. As a reference to La Malinche, a Nahua woman who translated for and aided Hernán Cortés, its meaning in this context is traitor.

There are a number of common Mexican phrases that reflect negative beliefs about black people, such as "getting black" (meaning getting angry), a "supper of blacks" or cena de negros (meaning a group of people getting together to cause trouble), "the little black boy in the rice" or el negrito en el arroz (meaning an unpleasant dark skin tone), and work like a black or trabajar como negro (which refers to work as a slave).

- Prieto: term used to disparagingly refer to people with dark complexions.
- Naco: according to the Royal Spanish Academy Dictionary, naco is synonymous with 'Indigenous peoples'. According to the Diccionario de mexicanismos, the word defines something or someone that is perceived as vulgar, in bad taste, without civility, a person of Indigenous origin, or low income. However, the term is most frequently used to refer disparagingly to poor people or those "with little culture."
- Pelado: its use is similar to the previous term, naco.
- Indio: term used primarily by light-skinned Mexicans to refer disparagingly to a dark, Indigenous, or low-income person.
- Chirigüillo: term used in the country's white-majority states to refer to Mexicans from rural areas or of Indigenous descent.
- Gringo: a term used widely in Latin-American to refer to foreigners, especially those from the USA. Its usage originates from describing speakers of European languages unintelligible to Spanish speakers.
- Cholo: A term normally used inoffensively to describe Chicano gang culture, but was originally used for people of mixed-blood heritage in the Spanish Empire in Latin America and its successor states as part of castas, the informal ranking of society by heritage.
- Güero or güerito: almost exclusively used inoffensively, it is used primarily by brown people to refer to a white, blonde or light-skinned person.
- Gachupín: a pejorative term used for native Spanish who live in Mexico. It is an old word, derived from the period of Nueva España. Miguel Hidalgo y Costilla mentioned the word in the Grito de Dolores: "Mueran los gachupines" (Death to the gachupines!).

== In popular culture ==
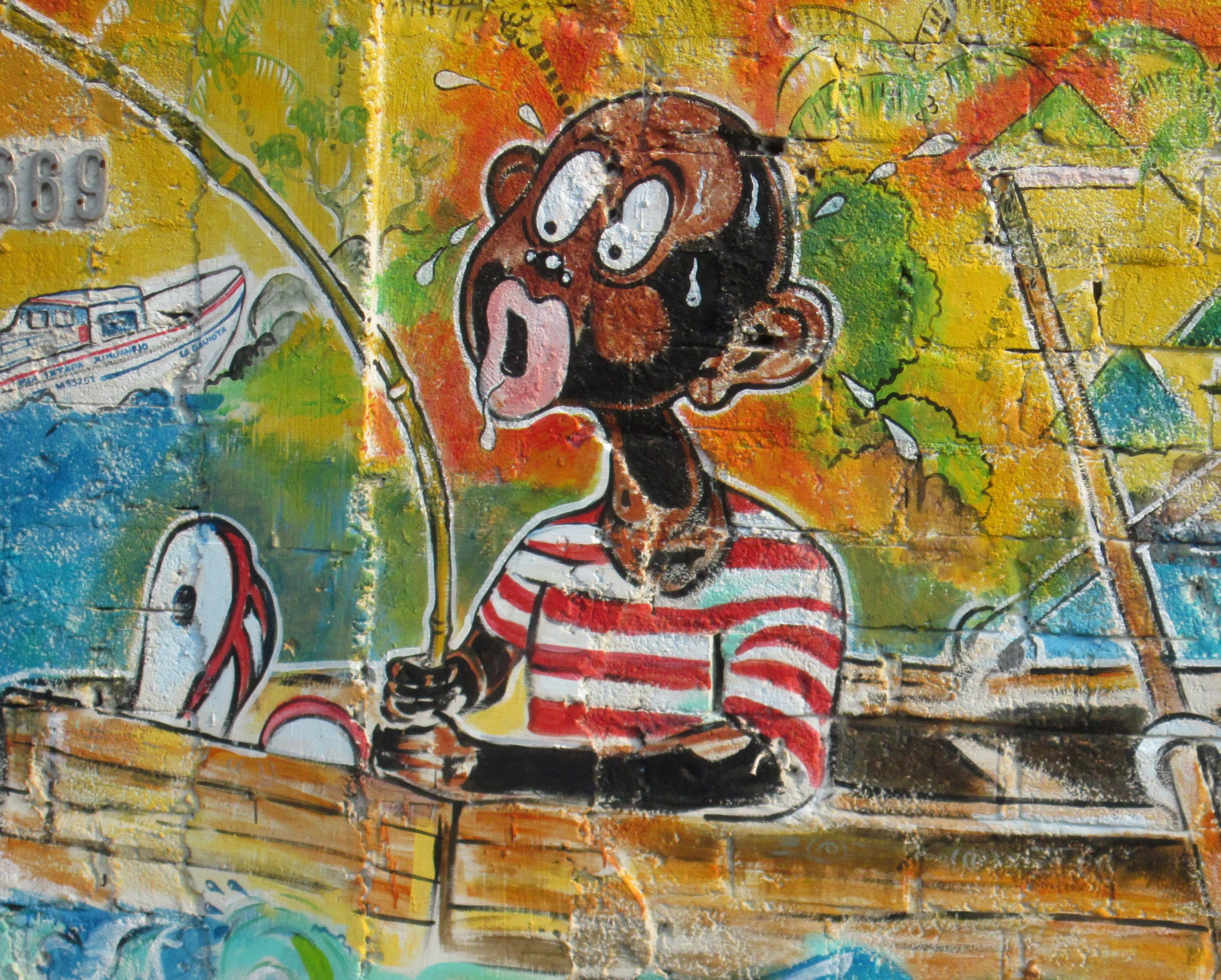
Memín Pinguin mural (cropped)

The Mexican comic strip created by Yolanda Vargas, Memín Pinguín, used racist stereotypes of black people.

Reproductions of Nazi regalia are found regularly in Mexico City markets.

== See also ==
- Classism
- Stereotyping
- White Mexicans
- Xenophobia
