= Spaniards in Mexico =

Españoles en México
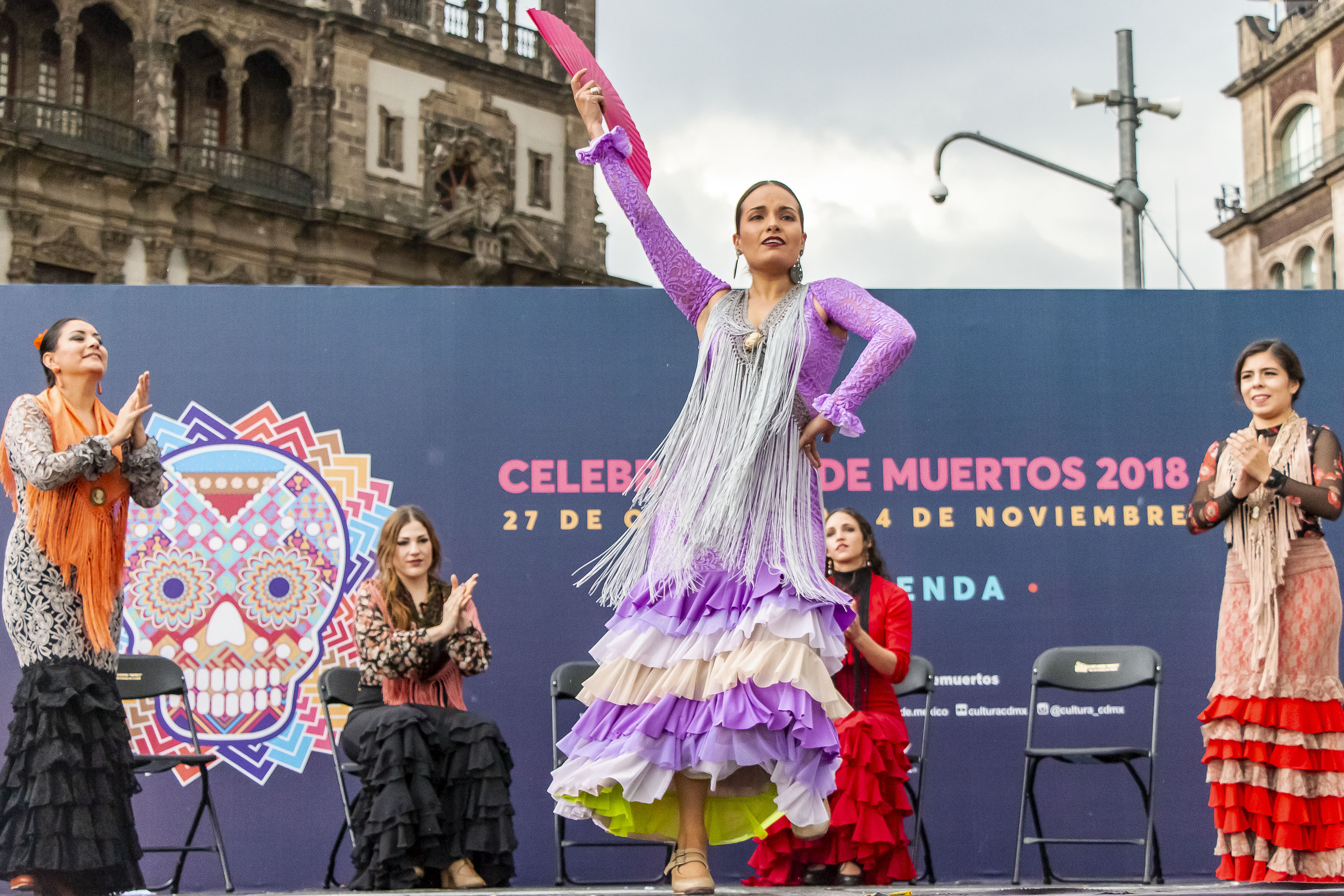
- Women from Seville celebrating the Day of the Dead in Mexico City (2018)

Total population
- 20,763 Spaniards (born in Spain); 144,553 Spanish nationals (2020)^{Note}

Languages
- Spanish (Peninsular Spanish dialects and Mexican Spanish dialects) Minority speaks Galician; Catalan; Basque

Religion
- Predominantly Roman Catholicism, also Sephardic Judaism, Islam

Related ethnic groups
- Mestizo Mexican, other Spanish diaspora
- Note: 20,763 individuals were born in Spain, 100,067 in Mexico, 3,689 in other countries and 210 were n/a.

Spanish Mexicans are citizens or residents of Mexico who identify as Spanish as a result of nationality or recent ancestry. Spanish immigration to Mexico began in the early 1500s and spans to the present day. The vast majority of Mexicans have at least partial Spanish ancestry; the northern and western regions of Mexico have a higher prevalence of Spanish heritage. There are three recognized large-scale Spanish immigration waves to the territory which is now Mexico: the first arrived during the colonial period, the second during the Porfiriato and the third after the Spanish Civil War.

The first Spanish settlement was established in February 1519 by Hernán Cortés in the Yucatan Peninsula, accompanied by about 11 ships, 500 men, 13 horses and a small number of cannons. In March 1519, Cortés formally claimed the land for the Spanish crown and by 1521 secured the Spanish conquest of the Aztec Empire.

== Spanish colonial period ==
=== Historical context ===
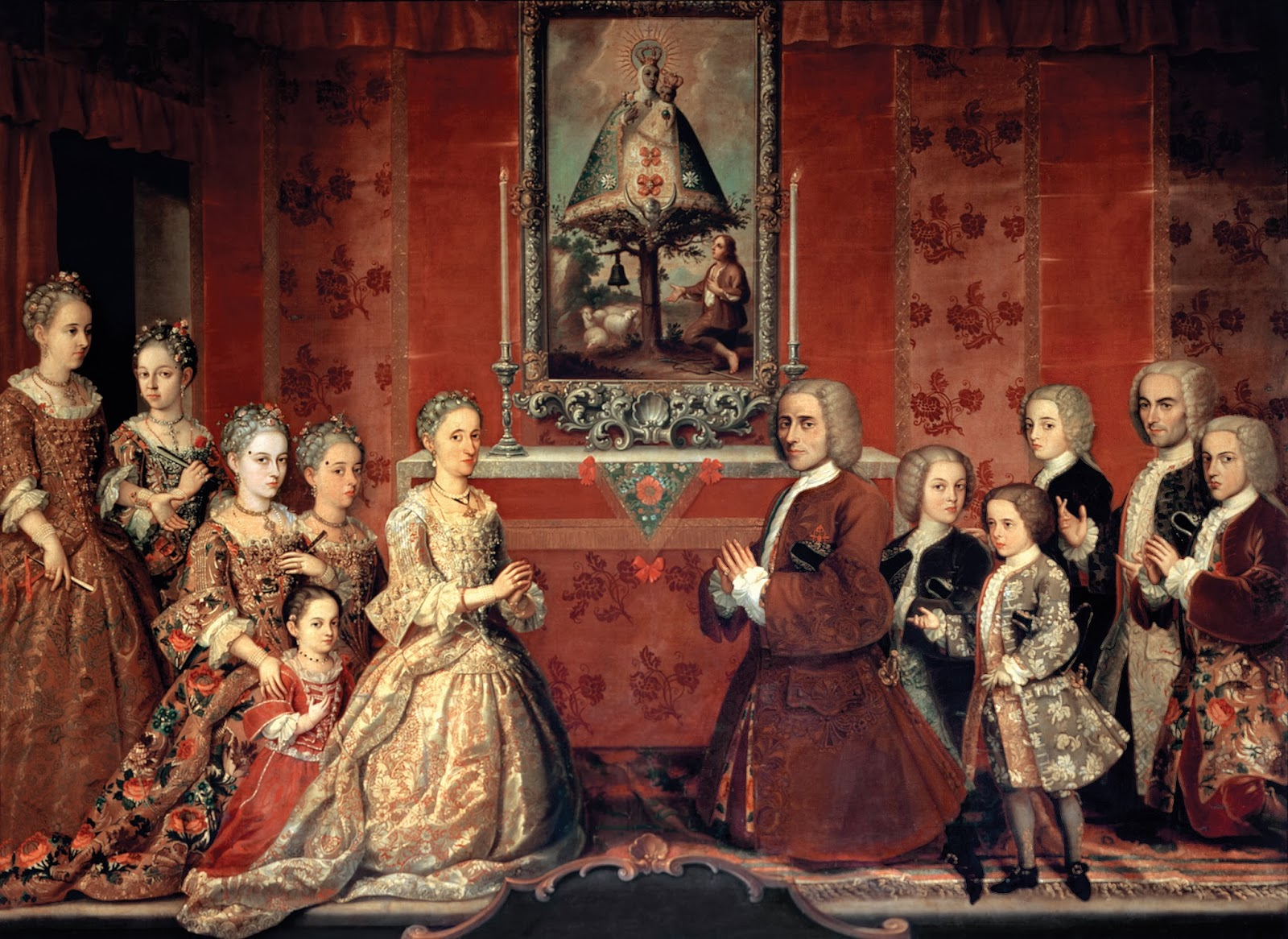
Fagoaga Arozqueta Basque family who migrated to Mexico City, c. 1735.

The exploitation of mining wealth from the indigenous populations through the mechanism of colonialism allowed the Spanish to develop manufacturing and agriculture that turned the Bajío regions and the valleys of Mexico and Puebla into prosperous agricultural areas with incipient industrial activity for the colonists. However, indigenous populations were decimated by European diseases and mistreatment from the Spanish as a direct result of this.

=== Demographics of settlers ===
In the 16th century, following the colonization of most of the new continents, perhaps as many as 240,000 Spaniards entered ports in the Americas. Since the conquest of the Aztec Empire, Mexico became the principal destination of Spanish colonial settlers in the 16th century. They were joined by 450,000 in the 17th century.

The first Spaniards who arrived in Mexico were soldiers and sailors from the Extremadura, Andalucía and La Mancha regions of Spain. At the end of the 16th century, both commoners and aristocrats from Spain were migrating to Mexico.

==== Canarian migration ====
Additionally, some Canarian families colonized parts of Mexico in the 17th century (as in the case of the Azuaje families) and when the Spanish crown encouraged Canarian colonization of the Americas through the Tributo de sangre (Blood Tribute) in the 18th century, many of them settled in Yucatán, where by the 18th century they controlled the trade network that distributed goods throughout the peninsula; their descendants are still counted among the most influential families of direct Spanish descent in Mexico.

During the 20th century, another group of Canarians settled in Mexico in the early 1930s, and as with Galician and other Spanish immigrants of the time, there were high rates of illiteracy and impoverishment among them, but they adapted relatively quickly.

== History following independence ==
=== 19th century ===
After the independence of Mexico and centuries of brutal colonial rule, animosity emerged against Spanish people in the new nation. From August 1827 to 1834, by a decree issued during the government of Lorenzo de Zavala, many Spaniards and their families were expelled from the State of Mexico and killed. The state government, influenced by English masons or Yorkers, based on the Plan of Iguala and Treaty of Córdoba, liberated the state by stripping Spaniards of their haciendas, farms, ranches and properties.

On December 20, 1827, state deputies repealed the Spanish expulsion law, and many Criollo families returned to their farms and ranches protected by state congressional deputies. In the constitution of 1857, the ambiguities about Mexican citizens are removed, and Spaniards were recognized as foreign people.

=== 20th and 21st centuries ===
In 1910, there were 30,000 Spaniards in Mexico, with many participating in economic activities as agricultural labor and trade in urban areas. However, because they proportionally only made up 0.02% of the population in Mexico at the time, they could not influence the country's political life.

Most recent migrants came during the Spanish Civil War. More than 25,000 Spanish refugees settled in Mexico between 1939 and 1942, largely during the administration of President Lazaro Cardenas del Río. Some of the migrants returned to Spain after the Civil War, but many more remained in Mexico.

Due to the 2008 financial crisis and the resulting economic decline and high unemployment in Spain, many Spaniards emigrated to Mexico to seek new opportunities. For example, during the last quarter of 2012, 7,630 work permits were granted to Spaniards.

== Economic and social issues ==
The Spanish community in Mexico includes business people, entertainers, academics, artists, and professional students. According to Milenio, Spanish companies are the largest foreign investors in Mexico.

== Xenophobia ==
The word gachupín is used for Spaniards who live in Mexico and Guatemala as a slur, referring to conquistadors and people from Spain. Official history says Miguel Hidalgo y Costilla mentioned in the Grito de Dolores; Mueran los gachupines (Death to gachupines!).

Diego Rivera caused controversy with his mural Historia del estado de Morelos, conquista y revolución (The History of the State of Morelos, Conquest and Revolution), painted between 1929 and 1930. He was accused of Hispanophobia and his mural created a diplomatic conflict between the Mexican and Spanish governments. Upon being asked about criticisms of his mural, Rivera only replied “¡ya apareció el gachupín!” ("here's the gachupín").

== Education ==
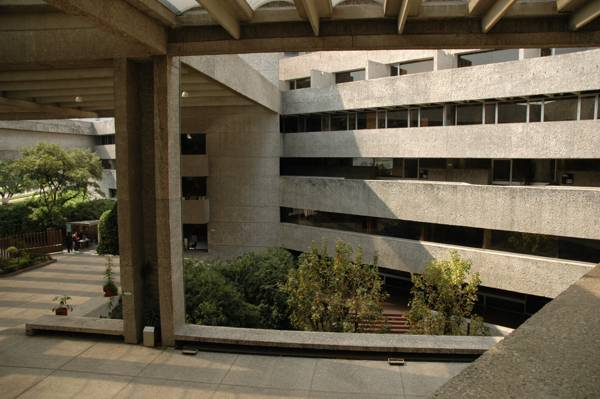
The Colegio de México

Important Spanish schools remain in Mexico, such as Colegio Madrid of Mexico City, a scholarly institute founded in 1941 by Spanish immigrants and Mexican teachers. This is a private school for elementary education.

The Colegio de México (Colmex) was an organization of Spanish Civil War exiles beginning as "Casa de España en México" (House of Spain in Mexico). In 1939, Alfonso Reyes would be president of the "Colegio" until his death. Historian Daniel Cosío Villegas played an important role in its institutionalization and the Colegio's library bears his name.

== Spanish culture in Mexico ==
Mexico is one of the largest countries in the Hispanosphere. Its culture is derived from both its indigenous cultures and the one from the Spanish founders and settlers of New Spain, which would eventually become the modern day Republic of Mexico.

=== Languages ===
Spanish was brought to Mexico around 500 years ago. As a result of prolonged and mass immigration, many urban centers were predominantly populated by Spaniards by the early 19th century. Mexico City (Tenochtitlán) had also been the capital of the Aztec Empire, and many speakers of the Aztec language Nahuatl continued to live there and in the surrounding region, outnumbering Spanish-speakers for several generations. Consequently, Mexico City tended historically to exercise a standardizing effect over the entire country, more or less, evolving into a distinctive dialect of Spanish which incorporated a significant number of Hispanicized Nahuatl words.

Many Catalans fleeing Francoist Spain immigrated to Mexico, where they were free to express the Catalan language. The Orfeó Català de Mèxic was a mecca for Catalan speakers and artists.

=== Charreria ===
Charrería, a word encompassing all aspects of the art of raising horses, evolved from the traditions that came to Mexico from Salamanca, Spain in the 16th century. When the Spanish first settled in Colonial Mexico, they were under orders to raise horses named criollos (Spanish people), but not to allow the indigenous people to ride. However, by 1528 the Spanish had very large cattle-raising estates and found it necessary to employ indigenous people as vaqueros or Creole herdsman, who soon became excellent horsemen. Smaller landholders, known as rancheros or ranchers, were the first genuine charros and they are credited as the inventors of the charreada.

=== Bullfighting ===
Bullfighting arrived in Mexico with the first Spaniards. Records are found of the first bullfights debuted in Mexico on June 26, 1526, with a bullfight in Mexico City held in honor of explorer Hernán Cortés, who had just come back from Honduras (then known as Las Hibueras). From that point on, bullfights were staged all over Mexico as part of various civic, social and religious celebrations. Today, there are about 220 permanent bullrings throughout Mexico. Further, the largest bullfighting venue of its kind is the Plaza de toros México in central Mexico City; the venue opened in 1946 and seats 48,000 people.

== Principal areas of settlement ==
The Asturians are a very large community that has a long history in Mexico, dating from colonial times to the present.

=== Mexico City ===
Mexico City has the biggest Spanish population in the country. In this city are all the Spanish institutions as Embassy of Spain, cultural centers as soon as Centro Asturiano, Centro Gallego, Casa de Madrid, Casa de Andalucía, Centro Montañes, Orfeo Catalán de Mexico, Centro Vasco, Centro Canario, Centro Republicano Español, Ateneo Español, Casino Español, Asociación Valenciana, Centro Castellano, and health institutions as the Beneficiencia Española, Hospital Español and Hospital-ito.

Mexico City is also home to important Spanish schools and universities such as the Colegio Madrid and Colegio de México.

== Demographics ==
Spanish descendants make up the largest group of Europeans in Mexico and a majority of Mexicans have some degree of Spanish descent. Most of their ancestors arrived during the colonial period but further hundreds of thousands have since then immigrated, especially during the Spanish Civil War in the 1930s. The Encyclopædia Britannica states those of predominantly European descent make up closer to one-sixth (≈17%) of the Mexican population.

Spaniards in Mexico
Year	Residents
2010	77,069 (INE)
2011	86,658 (INE)
2012	94.617 (INE)
2013	100.782 (INE)
2014	108,314 (INE)
2015	115,620 (INE)
2016	123,189 (INE)
2017	130,832 (INE)
2018	135,155 (INE)
2019	140,199 (INE)
2020	144,553 (INE)

Spaniards living in Mexico by state INEGI 2020
Raiking	State	Population 2020	Ref.
1°	Mexico City	2 511	
2°	State of Mexico	457	
3°	Jalisco	451	
4°	Querétaro	420	
5°	Puebla	409	
6°	Nuevo León	375	
7°	Yucatán	238	
8°	Guanajuato	218	
9°	Aguascalientes	185	
10°	San Luis Potosí	149	
11°	Morelos	128	
12°	Michoacán	123	
13°	Sinaloa	110	
14°	Hidalgo	107	
15°	Sonora	82	
16°	Oaxaca	76	
17°	Baja California	75	
18°	Baja California Sur	75	
19°	Colima	68	
20°	Durango	46	
21°	Nayarit	40	
22°	Zacatecas	35	
23°	Tlaxcala	27	
TOTAL		20 763	Mexico
Notes: Instituto Nacional de Estadística y Geografía (INEGI)

== See also ==
- Immigration to Mexico
- Basque Mexicans
- Mexico–Spain relations
- Mexican immigration to Spain
- Mexicans of European descent
- Hispanos of New Mexico
- Portuguese Mexican
- Mestizos in Mexico
- White Mexicans
