= White Mexicans =

Ethnic group(s)

Mexicanos blancos (Spanish)

Regions with significant populations
- Entire country; highest percentages found in the Northern, Western and Bajío regions

Languages
- Majority: Spanish (Mexican Spanish); Minority: German (Plautdietsch); Venetian (Chipilo Venetian)

Religion
- Christianity (predominantly Roman Catholicism and minority Protestantism · Mormonism)

Related ethnic groups
- Spaniards · Arabs · Italians · Germans · Mestizo · Other White Latin Americans

White Mexicans (Spanish: Mexicanos blancos) are Mexicans who are associated with the racial category of whiteness. In Mexico, racial classification is highly ambiguous and has often been defined by culture, language, ideology, ancestry, and phenotype (such as skin color) rather than by a single classification system.

In 1900, the Mexican Census reported 19% of the population was White and 43% was "mixed". Mexico does not have a single system of skin color categorization; modern estimates of Mexico's White population vary depending on context and due to different methodologies used. Latinobarómetro in 2023 and the Factbook in 2012 suggest that around 10% are White or have predominantly European ancestry. Britannica in 2000 and a 2005 study by a professor of the National Autonomous University of Mexico both estimated the group to be around 15%. Social stratification and racism in Mexico have remained in the modern era. Although phenotype is not as important as culture, European features and lighter skin tone are favored by middle- and upper-class groups.

The presence of Europeans in Mexico dates back to the Spanish conquest of the Aztec Empire, and during the colonial period, most European immigration was Spanish. However, in the 19th and 20th centuries, significant waves of European and European-derived populations from North and South America immigrated to Mexico. This intermixing between European immigrants and Indigenous peoples resulted in the emergence of the Mestizo group, which became the majority of Mexico's population by the time of the Mexican Revolution. Some scholars challenge this narrative, citing church and census records that indicate interracial unions in Mexico were rare among all groups. These records also dispute other academic narratives, such as the idea that European immigrants were predominantly male or that "pure Spanish" individuals formed a small elite. In fact, Spaniards were often the most numerous ethnic group in colonial cities and there were menial workers and people in poverty who were of full Spanish origin.

While genetic evidence suggests that most European immigrants to Mexico were male, and that the modern population of Mexico was primarily formed through the mixing of Spanish males and Native American females, how pronounced said gender asymmetry was varies considerably depending on the study. The Native American maternal mtDNA contribution figures range from 59% to 90%, while research on the X chromosome shows less variation, with the reported Native American female contribution oscillating between 50% and 54%. Present day Mestizos have varying degrees of European and Indigenous ancestry, with some having European genetic ancestry exceeding 90%, albeit after the Mexican Revolution the government began defining ethnicity on cultural standards (mainly the language spoken) rather than racial or phenotypic ones, which led to a large number of White persons to be classified as Mestizos.

== History ==
=== Establishment of Europeans in Mexico ===
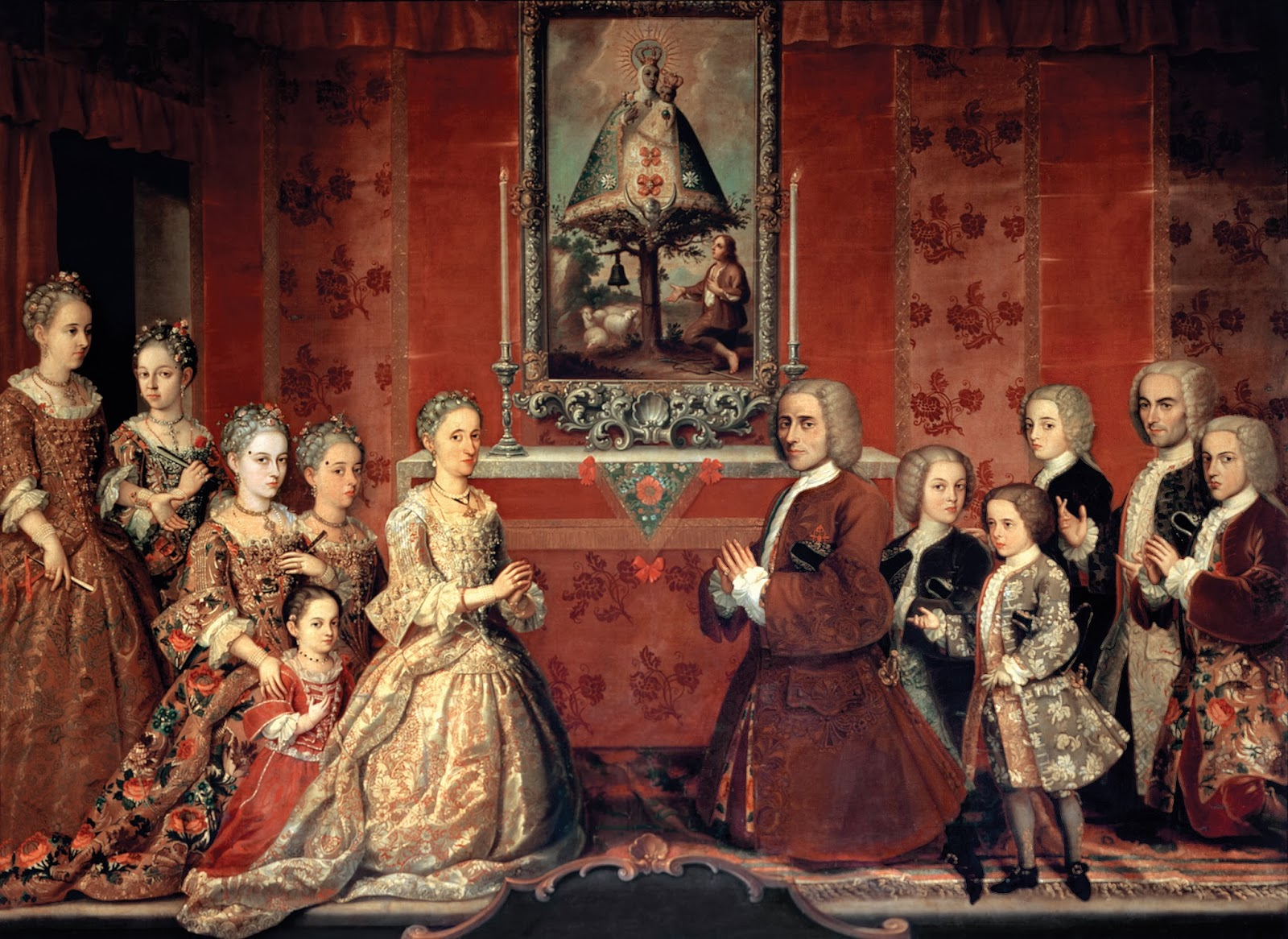
Portrait of the family Fagoaga Arozqueta. An upper class colonial Mexican family of Spanish ancestry (referred to as Criollos) in Mexico City, New Spain, ca. 1730.

The presence of Europeans in what is nowadays known as Mexico dates back to the Spanish conquest of the Aztec Empire in the early 16th century by Hernán Cortés, his troops and a number of indigenous city-states who were tributaries and rivals of the Aztecs, such as the Totonacs, the Tlaxcaltecas and Texcocanos among others. After years of war, the coalition led by Cortés finally managed to conquer the Aztec Empire which would result in the foundation of the Viceroyalty of New Spain and while this new state granted a series of privileges to the members of the allied indigenous tribes such as nobiliary titles and swathes of land, the Spanish held the most political and economic power. The small number of Spaniards who inhabited the new kingdom would soon be complemented by a steady migration flow of Spanish people, as it was the interest of the Spanish crown to Hispanicize and Christianize the region given that Indigenous peoples and their customs were considered uncivilized, thus the Spanish language and culture were imposed and indigenous ones suppressed.

The Mexican experience mirrors much of that of the rest of Latin America, as attitudes towards race, including identification, were set by the conquistadors and Spanish who came soon after. Through the colonial period, the Spanish and their descendants, called "criollos" remained outnumbered by the indigenous and "mestizos" or those of mixed Spanish and indigenous parents (albeit a person of 7/8 Spanish ancestry and 1/8 or less indigenous ancestry could be considered to be "criollo"). To keep power, the Spanish enforced a hierarchical class system in New Spain's society, with those born in Spain (known as Peninsulares) being the most privileged, followed by criollos, then Mestizos, then the indigenous and finally the Africans. Nonetheless, the system was not completely rigid and elements such as social class, social relations and who a person descended from did figure into it. However, the notion of "Spanishness" would remain at the top and "Indianness" would be at the bottom, with those mixed being somewhere in the middle. This idea remained officially in force through the rest of the colonial period.

Mexico's European heritage is strongly associated with Spanish settlement during the colonial period, Mexico not having witnessed the same scale of mass recent-immigration as other New World countries such as the United States, Brazil, and Argentina. However, this ruling is less blanket fact and more of a consequence due to Mexico's enormous population. Regardless, Mexico ranks 3rd behind Brazil and Argentina for European immigration in Latin America with its culture owing a great deal to the significant German, Italian, Irish, British, Polish, and French populations. White Mexicans rather, descend of a considerably ethnocentrist group of Spanish people who, beginning with the arrival and establishment of the conquistadors to then be supplemented with clerics, workers, academics etc. immigrated to what today is Mexico. The criollos (as people born in the colonies to Spanish parents were called until the beginning of the 20th century) would favor for marriage other Spanish immigrants even if they were of a less privileged economic class than them, as to preserve the Spanish lineage and customs was seen as the top priority. Once Mexico achieved its independence and immigration from European countries other than Spain became accepted, the criollos did the same, and sought to assimilate the new European immigrants into the overwhelmingly Spanish-origin white Mexican population, as the yearly immigration rate of Europeans to Mexico never exceeded 2% in relation to the country's total population, assimilation of the new immigrants was easy and Mexican hyphenated identities never appeared.

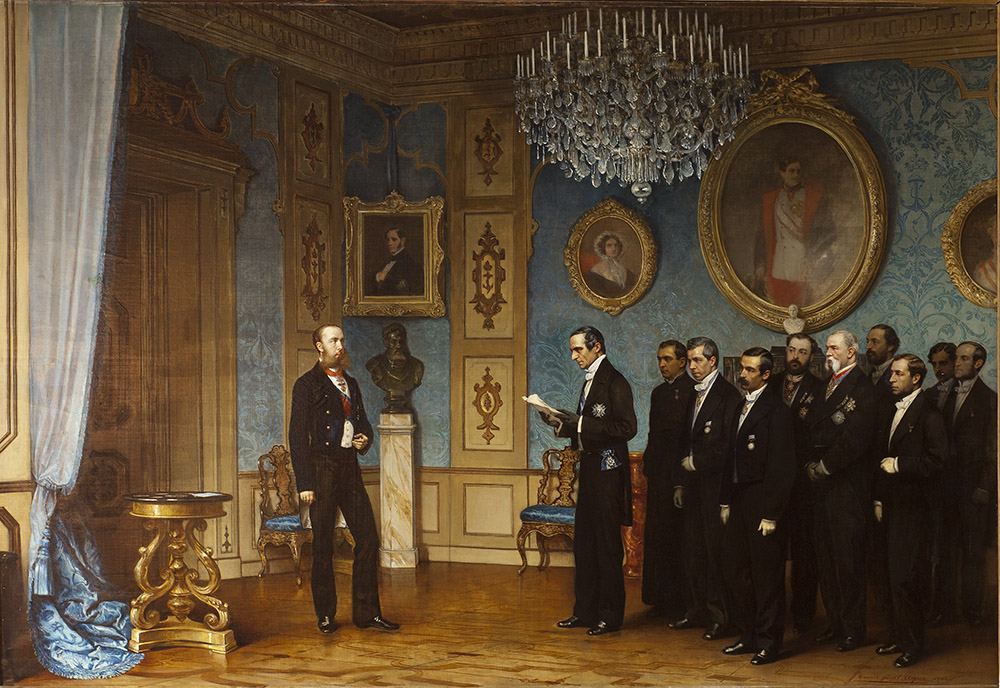
Maximilian receiving a Mexican delegation at Miramare Castle in Trieste. Painting by Cesare dell'Acqua (1821–1905)

Another way on which European immigration to Mexico differed from that of other New World countries was on the profile of the needed immigrant. As New Spain's main economic activities were not related to agriculture (and the manpower for it was already supplied by the converted indigenous population), the country didn't enforce any sort of programs that would make it an attractive destination for European farmers. Much more important to the economy was mining and miners came from Europe, in particular from Cornwall, U.K. and even today parts of Mineral del Monte and Pachuca maintain strong links to both their British heritage and with the United Kingdom. There was also strong demand for people with specialized skills in fields such as geology, metallurgy, commerce, law, medicine etc. As stories of professional immigrants amassing huge wealth in a pair of years were commonly heard, New Spain became very attractive only for Europeans who filled these profiles and their families, which in the end resulted on the country getting relatively less European immigration, is also because of the aforementioned reasons that the majority of Spanish immigrants who arrived to the country were from the northern regions of Spain, mainly Cantabria, Navarra, Asturias, Galicia and the Basque Country.

Criollo resentment of the privileges afforded to the Peninsulares was the main reason behind the Mexican War of Independence. When the war ended in 1821, the new Mexican government expelled the peninsulares (approximately 10,000 – 20,000 people) in the 1820s and 1830s which, to a degree, kept the European ethnicity from growing as a percentage; this expulsion, however, did not lead to any permanent ban on European immigrants, even from Spain. Independence did not end the economic and social privilege based on race, as the Criollos took over from those of Spanish birth. A division between "Spanish" and "indigenous" remained, with Criollos distinguishing themselves from the rest of society as the guardians of Spanish culture as well as the Catholic religion. However, due to the abolition of the caste system, the division became more about money and social class and less about biological differences, which increased the possibilities of social mobility for Mestizo and Indigenous Mexicans. For this reason, many of the political and cultural struggles of the latter 19th and early 20th centuries would be between the Criollos and the Mestizos.

According to Mexico's first racial census published in 1793, the Euro-descendant population was between 18%-22% of the population (with Mestizos being 21%-25% and Amerindians being 51%-61%). By 1921, when the second nationwide census that considered a person's race took place, 59% of the population self-identified as being of European descent, with 59% being Mestizo and 29% being Amerindian. Modern Mexican academics have scrutinized these numbers, saying that such a drastic alteration of demographic trends is not possible and cite, among other statistics, the relatively low frequency of marriages between people of different continental ancestries.

== Official censuses ==
The Viceroyalty of New Spain conducted the country's first census in 1793. Only part of the original dataset survives, thus most of what is known of it comes from references made by researchers for their own works. Subsequent censuses did not survey race until 1921. This census was the last time the Mexican government included a comprehensive racial classification in a census.

=== 1793 census ===
New Spain in 1819 with the boundaries established at the Adams-Onís Treaty

Also known as the "Revillagigedo census" due to its creation being ordered by the Count of the same name, this census was Mexico's (then known as the Viceroyalty of New Spain) first ever nationwide population census. Most of its original datasets have reportedly been lost; thus most of what is known about it nowadays comes from essays and field investigations made by academics who had access to the census data and used it as reference for their works such as Prussian geographer Alexander von Humboldt. Each author gives different estimations for each racial group in the country, although they don't vary much, with Europeans ranging from 18% to 22% of New Spain's population, Mestizos ranging from 21% to 25%, Indians ranging from 51% to 61% and Africans being between 6,000 and 10,000, The estimations given for the total population range from 3,799,561 to 6,122,354. It is concluded then, that across nearly three centuries of colonization, the population growth trends of whites and mestizos were even, while the total percentage of the indigenous population decreased at a rate of 13%-17% per century. The authors assert that rather than whites and mestizos having higher birthrates, the reason for the indigenous population's numbers decreasing lies on them suffering of higher mortality rates, due living in remote locations rather than on cities and towns founded by the Spanish colonists or being at war with them. It is also for these reasons that the number of Indigenous Mexicans presents the greater variation range between publications, as in cases their numbers in a given location were estimated rather than counted, leading to possible overestimations in some provinces and possible underestimations in others.

Intendancy/territory	European population (%)	Indigenous population (%)	Mestizo population (%)
Mexico	16.9%	66.1%	16.7%
Puebla	10.1%	74.3%	15.3%
Oaxaca	06.3%	88.2%	05.2%
Guanajuato	25.8%	44.0%	29.9%
San Luis Potosi	13.0%	51.2%	35.7%
Zacatecas	15.8%	29.0%	55.1%
Durango	20.2%	36.0%	43.5%
Sonora	28.5%	44.9%	26.4%
Yucatan	14.8%	72.6%	12.3%
Guadalajara	31.7%	33.3%	34.7%
Veracruz	10.4%	74.0%	15.2%
Valladolid	27.6%	42.5%	29.6%
Nuevo Mexico	~	30.8%	69.0%
Vieja California	~	51.7%	47.9%
Nueva California	~	89.9%	09.8%
Coahuila	30.9%	28.9%	40.0%
Nuevo Leon	62.6%	05.5%	31.6%
Nuevo Santander	25.8%	23.3%	50.8%
Texas	39.7%	27.3%	32.4%
Tlaxcala	13.6%	72.4%	13.8%

~Europeans are included within the Mestizo category.

Regardless of the possible imprecisions related to the counting of Indigenous peoples living outside of the colonized areas, the effort that New Spain's authorities put on considering them as subjects is worth mentioning, as censuses made by other colonial or post-colonial countries did not consider American Indians to be citizens/subjects, as example the censuses made by the Viceroyalty of the Río de la Plata would only count the inhabitants of the colonized settlements. Other example would be the censuses made by the United States, that did not include Indigenous peoples living among the general population until 1860, and indigenous peoples as a whole until 1900.

=== 1921 census ===
Racial groups in Mexico (1921 census)
1. Mestizos (59.3%)
2. Indigenous (29.2%)
3. Whites (9.80%)
4. Other groups (1.00%)
5. Foreigners (0.71%)

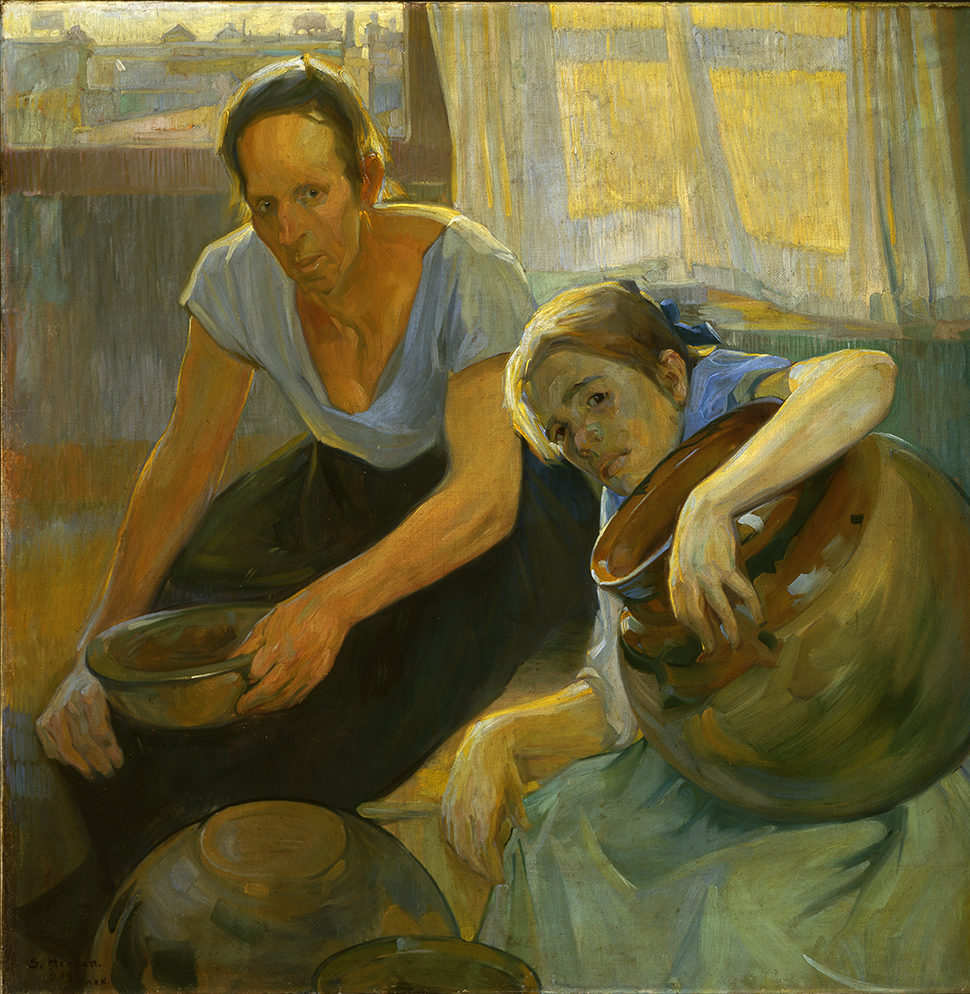
Vendedora de ollas (Pot saleswoman). Saturnino Herrán, 1909.

Made right after the consummation of the Mexican revolution, the social context on which this census was made makes it unique, as the government of the time was in the process of rebuilding the country and sought to unite all Mexicans under a single national identity using an ideology known as "mestizaje" (which asserts that Mexico's population as a whole is product of the admixture of all races). The 1921 census' results in regards to race, on which 59.3% of the Mexican population self-identified as Mestizo, 29.1% as Indigenous and only 9.8% as White were essential to cement this ideology which shaped Mexican identity and culture through the 20th century and remains prominent nowadays.

Modern academic evaluations of the census' results have proposed that the "mestizaje" process sponsored by the state was more "cultural than biological" which resulted in the numbers of the Mestizo Mexican group being inflated at the expense of the identity of other races.

This census was the last time the Mexican Government conducted a comprehensive racial census with the breakdown by states being the following (foreigners and people who answered "other" not included):

Federative Units	Mestizo Population (%)	Amerindian Population (%)	White Population (%)
Aguascalientes	66.12%	16.70%	16.77%
Baja California (Distrito Norte)	72.50%	07.72%	00.35%
Baja California (Distrito Sur)	59.61%	06.06%	33.40%
Campeche	41.45%	43.41%	14.17%
Coahuila	77.88%	11.38%	10.13%
Colima	68.54%	26.00%	04.50%
Chiapas	36.27%	47.64%	11.82%
Chihuahua	50.09%	12.76%	36.33%
Durango	89.85%	09.99%	00.01%
Guanajuato	96.33%	02.96%	00.54%
Guerrero	54.05%	43.84%	02.07%
Hidalgo	51.47%	39.49%	08.83%
Jalisco	75.83%	16.76%	07.31%
Mexico City	54.78%	18.75%	22.79%
State of Mexico	47.71%	42.13%	10.02%
Michoacan	70.95%	21.04%	06.94%
Morelos	61.24%	34.93%	03.59%
Nayarit	73.45%	20.38%	05.83%
Nuevo Leon	75.47%	05.14%	19.23%
Oaxaca	28.15%	69.17%	01.43%
Puebla	39.34%	54.73%	05.66%
Querétaro	80.15%	19.40%	00.30%
Quintana Roo	42.35%	20.59%	15.16%
San Luis Potosí	61.88%	30.60%	05.41%
Sinaloa	98.30%	00.93%	00.19%
Sonora	41.04%	14.00%	42.54%
Tabasco	53.67%	18.50%	27.56%
Tamaulipas	69.77%	13.89%	13.62%
Tlaxcala	42.44%	54.70%	02.53%
Veracruz	50.09%	36.60%	10.28%
Yucatán	33.83%	43.31%	21.85%
Zacatecas	86.10%	08.54%	05.26%

When the 1921 census's results are compared with the results of Mexico's recent censuses as well as with modern genetic research, high consistence is found in regards to the distribution of Indigenous Mexicans across the country, with states located in south and south-eastern Mexico having both, the highest percentages of population that self-identifies as Indigenous and the highest percentages of Amerindian genetic ancestry. However this is not the case when it comes to European Mexicans, as there are instances on which states that have been shown to have a considerably high European ancestry per scientific research are reported to have very small white populations in the 1921 census, with the most extreme case being that of the state of Durango, where the aforementioned census asserts that only 0.01% of the state's population (33 persons) self-identified as "white" while modern scientific research shows that the population of Durango has similar genetic frequencies to those found on European peoples (with the state's Indigenous population showing almost no foreign admixture either). Various authors theorize that the reason for these inconsistencies may lie in the Mestizo identity promoted by the Mexican government, which reportedly led to people who are not biologically Mestizos to identify as such.

=== Present day ===
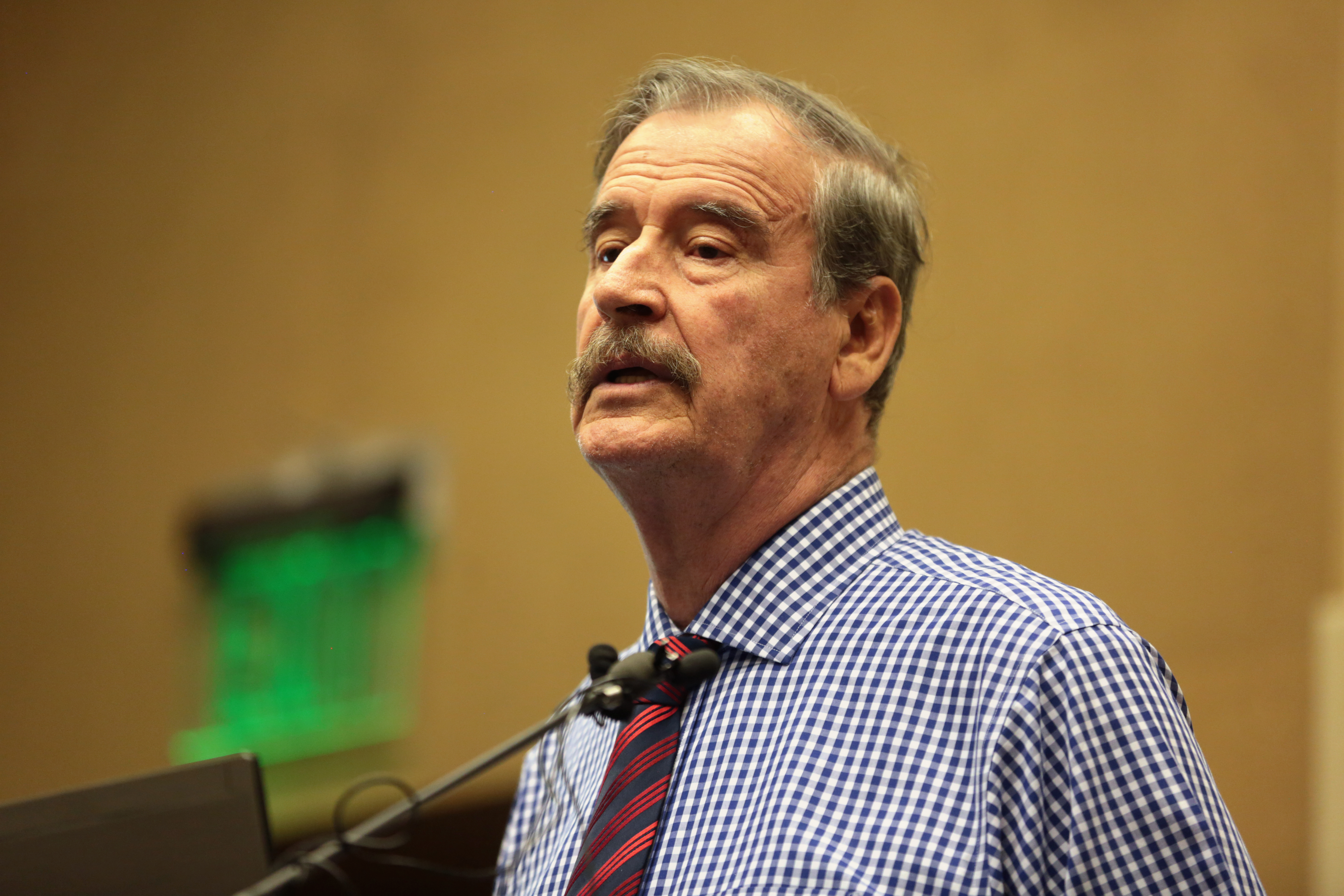
Vicente Fox Quesada, 62nd President of Mexico.

Since the end of the Mexican Revolution, the official identity promoted by the government for non-indigenous Mexicans has been the Mestizo one (a mixture of European and indigenous culture and heritage), established with the original intent of eliminating divisions and creating a unified identity that would allow Mexico to modernize and integrate with the international community. Even though nowadays the large majority of the country's population consider themselves part of a unified "Mexican" ethnicity, differences on physical features and appearance continue playing an important role on everyday social interactions, taking this into account, on recent time Mexico's government has begun conducting ethnic investigations to quantify the different ethnic groups that inhabit the country with the aim of reducing social inequalities between them.

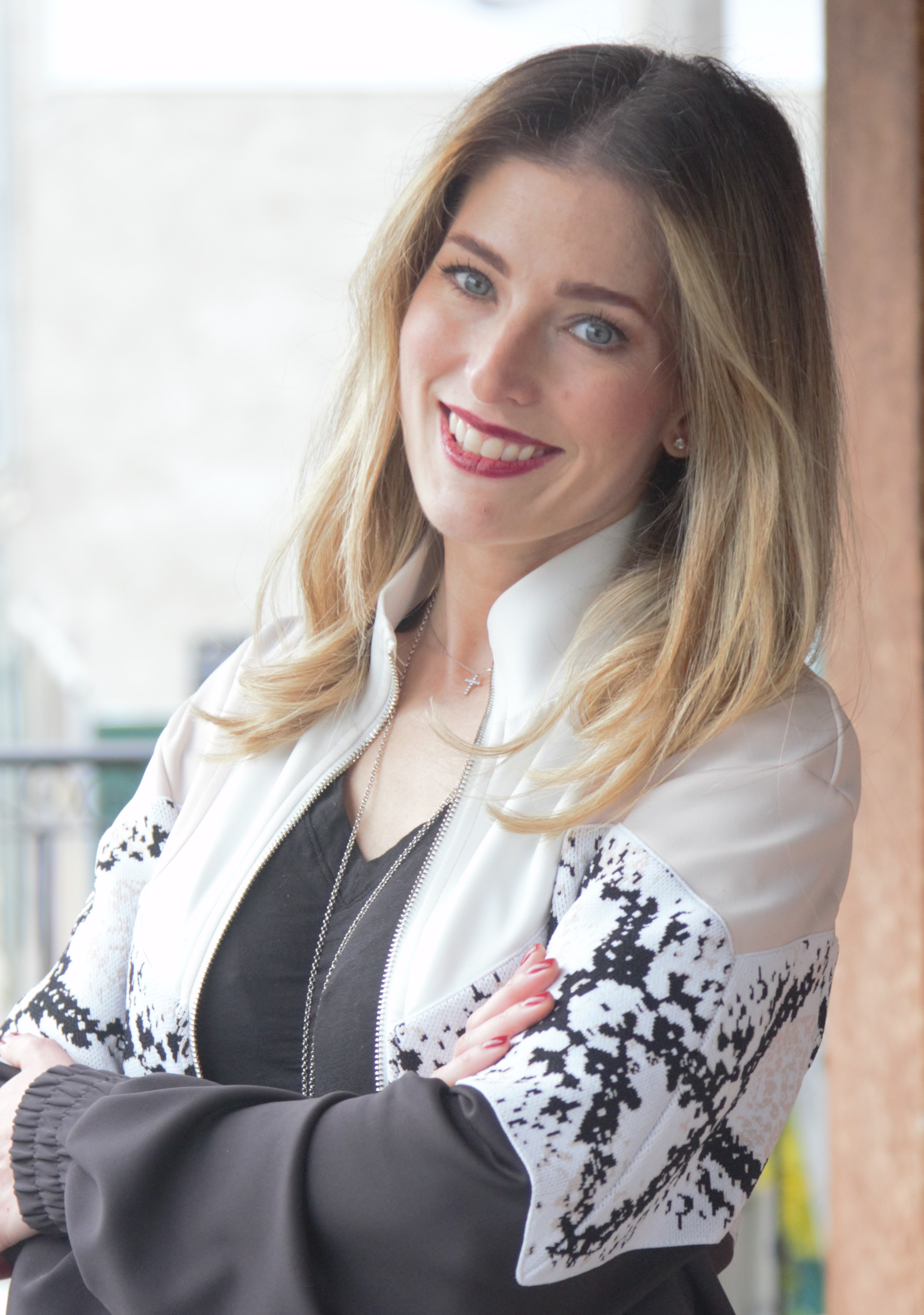
TV presenter Maria Ines is from Guadalajara.

According to these recent investigations, 19.4% of Mexico's population self-identify as Indigenous and 2.04% self-identify as Afro-Mexican.

Generally speaking ethnic relations can be arranged on an axis between the two extremes of European and Amerindian cultural heritage, this is a remnant of the Spanish caste system which categorized individuals according to their perceived level of biological mixture between the two groups although in practice the classificatory system has become fluid, mixing socio-cultural traits with phenotypical traits allowing individuals to move between categories and define their ethnic and racial identities situationally, the presence of considerable portions of the population with African and Asian heritage makes the situation more complex. Even though there is a large variation in phenotypes among Mexicans, European looks are still strongly preferred in Mexican society, with lighter skin receiving more positive attention, as it is associated with higher social class, power, money, and modernity. In contrast, Indigenous ancestry is often associated with having an inferior social class, as well as lower levels of education. These distinctions are strongest in Mexico City, where the most powerful of the country's elite are located.

Even though the Mexican government didn't use racial terms related to European or white people officially for almost a century (resuming using such terms after 2010), the concepts of "white people" (known as güeros or blancos in Mexican Spanish) and of "being white" didn't disappear and are still present in everyday Mexican culture: different idioms of race are used in Mexico's society that serve as mediating terms between racial groups. It is not strange to see street vendors calling a potential customer Güero or güerito, sometimes even when the person is not light-skinned. In this instance it is used to initiate a kind of familiarity, but in cases where social/racial tensions are relatively high, it can have the opposite effect. The lack of a clear dividing line between white and mixed race Mexicans has made the concept of race relatively fluid, with descent being more of a determining factor than biological traits, however contemporary sociologists and historians agree that, given that the concept of "race" has a psychological foundation rather than a biological one and to society's eyes a Mestizo with a high percentage of European ancestry is considered "white" and a Mestizo with a high percentage of Indigenous ancestry is considered "Indian," a person who identifies with a given ethnic group should be allowed to, even if biologically doesn't completely belong to that group.

== Distribution and estimations ==
Mexico's National Institute of Statistics and Geography (INEGI) has conducted surveys in which a Mexican has the choice of identifying as "White" based on skin color. For surveys of descrimination and racism, INEGI categorizes Mexicans as "dark-skinned Mexicans", "medium-skinned Mexicans" and "light-skinned Mexicans" rather than using race or ethnic categories. Independent institutions have used the presence of light hair colors to calculate Mexico's white population; however, to use such features to delineate said ethnic group results in an underestimation of its numbers as not all of Europe's native populations have those traits. Similarly, not only people with those phenotypical features are considered to be white by the majority of Mexican society.

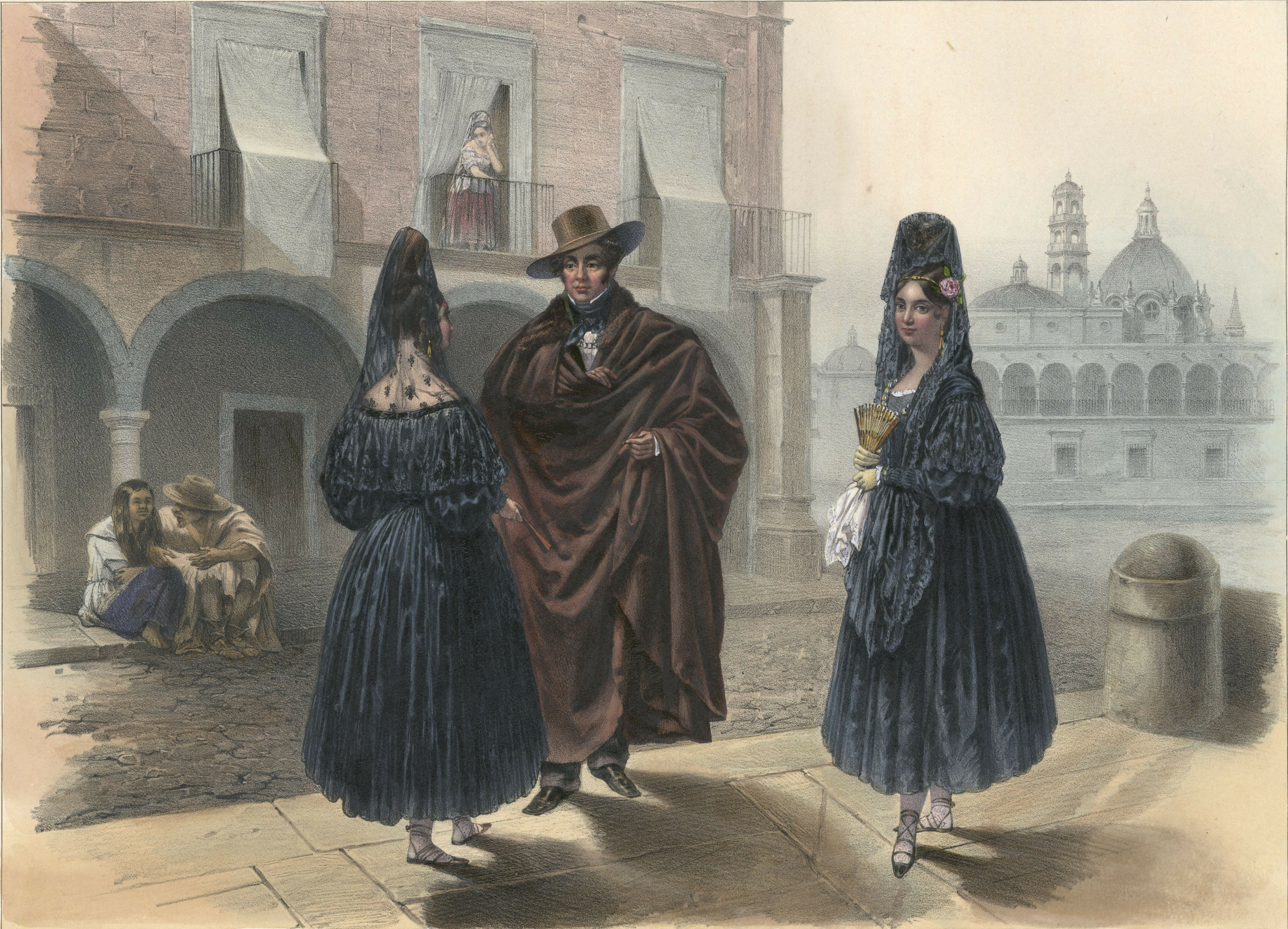
White Mexican women wearing the mantilla, painting by Carl Nebel, 1836

In northern, western and Bajío Mexico, the indigenous tribes were substantially smaller and unlike those found in central and southern Mexico they were mostly nomadic, therefore remaining isolated from colonial population centers, with hostilities between them and Mexican colonists often taking place. This eventually led the northeast region of the country to become the region with the highest proportion of whites during the Spanish colonial period albeit recent migration waves have been changing its demographic trends.

In 2010, CONAPRED (Mexico's National Council for the Prevention of Discrimination) conducted the ENADIS 2010 (National Survey About Discrimination) with the purpose of addressing the problems of racism that Mexicans of mainly Indigenous or African ancestry suffer in the hands of a society that favors light-skinned, European-looking Mexicans. In the press release of said report, CONAPRED stated that 47% of Mexicans (54% of women and 40% of men) identified with the lightest skin colors used in the census questionnaire. The council makes the supposition that the high difference reported between males and females is due to the "frequently racist publicity in media and due to racial prejudices in Mexico's society which shuns dark skin in favor of light skin, thus making women think that white is beautiful," stating that men are more likely to recognize their real skin color. A subsequent question in the same survey asks Mexicans to evaluate, from 0 to 10, how comfortable they are with their skin color, with the average score being 9.4 out of 10. Furthermore, there is scientific research proving that human females tend to have lighter skin than their male counterparts.

In 2017, Mexico's National Institute of Statistics and Geography published the Intergenerational Social Mobility Module (MMSI), composed of a series of nationwide surveys focused on education, generational economic mobility and ethnicity. It is particularly notorious for giving Mexicans the possibility to identify with a race (the available choices being "Indigenous", "Mestizo", "White", "Black" or "Other"). While the results of questions directly related to race were published, the percentage of Mexicans who identified with each race was not. Also included in the survey was a color palette (the same as the one used in the PERLA project: composed of 11 different tones with "A" being the darkest and "K" being the lightest) so a person could choose what color the skin of his/her face was. The percentage of Mexicans that identified with each skin color was not included in the main MMSI document but unlike racial composition it was made public through other official publications. The study's results received significant media coverage, which led to discussions about concepts including systemic racism, white privilege and colonialism The study concluded that Mexicans with medium ("F" tone) and darker skin tones have in average lower profile occupations than Mexicans with lighter skin tones. Also stated is that Mexicans with lighter skin tones (lighter than "F") have higher levels of academic achievement. The study also points out that out of the 4 racial categories used in the study, that of Indigenous Mexicans is the one that shows the highest percentage of positive social mobility (meaning that a person is better off than his/her parents were) while White Mexicans are the ones who have the lowest positive social mobility.

In 2018, the new edition of the ENADIS was published, this time being a joint effort by the CONAPRED and the INEGI with collaboration of the UNAM, the CONACyT and the CNDH. Like its 2010 antecessor, it surveyed Mexican citizens about topics related to discrimination and collected data related to phenotype and ethnic self-identification. It concluded that Mexico is still a fairly conservative country regarding minority groups such as religious minorities, ethnic minorities, foreigners and members of the LGBT community. Albeit there's pronounced regional differences, with states in the south-center regions of Mexico having in general notoriously higher discrimination rates towards the aforementioned social groups than the ones states in the western-north regions have. For the collecting of data related to skin color the palette used was again the PERLA one. This time 11.4% of Mexicans were reported to have the "darkest skin tones (A-E)", 59.2% to have "medium skin tones (F-G)" and 29.4% to have the "lightest skin tones (H-K)". The reason for the huge difference regarding the reported percentages of Mexicans with light skin (around 18% lower) and medium skin (around 16% higher) in the relation to previous nationwide surveys lies in the fact that the ENADIS 2017 prioritized the surveying of Mexicans from "vulnerable groups" which among other measures meant that states with known high numbers of people from said groups surveyed more people. In 2023, the 2022 edition of the ENADIS by the INEGI was published, this time 21.1% of Mexicans reported to belong to the "darkest skin tones (A-E)", 49.7% were reported to belong to "medium skin tones (F-G)" and 29.2% were reported to belong to the group of the "lightest skin tones (H-K)". On a similar manner to its predecessor, the survey was conducted with special attention on disadvantaged social groups, meaning that states with a known higher presence of such groups conducted more surveys proportionally.

Independent field studies have been made in attempt to quantify the number of European Mexicans living in modern Mexico. A study made by the University College London which included multiple Latin American countries and was made with collaboration of each country's anthropology and genetics institutes reported that the frequency of blond hair and light eyes in Mexicans was of 18.5% and 28.5% respectively, making Mexico the country with the second-highest frequency of blond hair in the study. Despite this, the European ancestry estimated for Mexicans is also the second-lowest of all countries included, the reason behind such discrepancy may lie in the fact that the samples used in Mexico's case were highly disproportional, as the northern and western regions of Mexico contain 45% of Mexico's population, but no more than 10% of the samples used in the study came from the states located in these regions. For the most part, the rest of the samples hailed from Mexico City and southern Mexican states.

In a 2010 study published in the American Sociological Review of social stratification by skin color, Andrés Villarreal conducted surveys of skin colors in Mexico over the course of a year. Per Villarreal, Mexico does not have a clear system of skin color categorization. Villarreal's surveys used a Likert scale to sort people into three categories: "white," "light brown" and "dark brown". According to the results of these surveys, men were more likely to have dark skin than women, people in the north had lighter skin than people in the south, and people in rural areas had darker skin than people in urban areas. (Note: Per Villarreal, the rural/urban divide persists even when controlling for darker skin due to sun exposure.) Villarreal concludes that people with darker skin face more economic, educational, and social discrimination, and this discrimination remains after accounting for other variables.

A study performed in hospitals of Mexico City suggests that socioeconomic factors influence the frequency of Mongolian spots among newborns, as evidenced by the higher prevalence of 85% in newborns from a public institution, typically associated with lower socioeconomic status, compared to a 33% prevalence in newborns from private hospitals, which generally cater to families with higher socioeconomic status. The Mongolian spot appears with a very high frequency (85-95%) in Asian, Native American and African children. The skin lesion reportedly almost always appears on South American and Mexican children who are racially Mestizos while having a very low frequency (5-10%) in Caucasian children. According to Ana Rosa Alvarado, a dermatologist who works for the IMSS Jalisco division, around half of the babies born have the Mongolian spot.

== Europeans in Independent Mexico ==
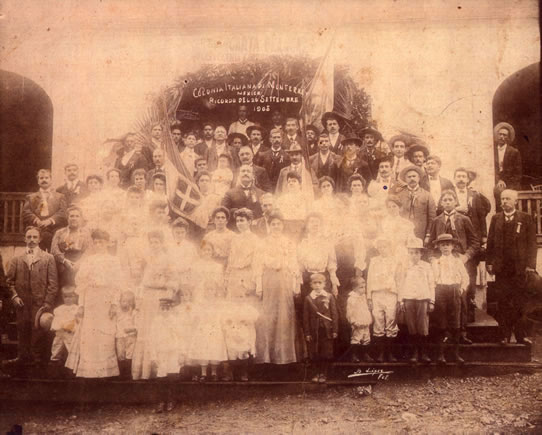
Italian immigrants in Monterrey in 1905

After the war of independence, the country's almost completely European elite would associate civilization with European characteristics, blaming the country's indigenous heritage for its inability to keep up with the economic development of the rest of the world. This led to active efforts to encourage the arrival of additional European immigrants. One of these efforts was the dispossession of large tracts of land from the Catholic Church with the aim of selling them to immigrants and others who would develop them. However, this did not have the desired effect mostly because of political instability. The Porfirio Díaz regime of the decades before the Mexican Revolution tried again, and expressly desired European immigration to promote modernization, instill Protestant work ethics and buttress what remained of Mexico's North from further U.S. expansionism. Díaz also expressed a desire to "whiten" Mexico's heavily racially mixed population, although this had more to do with culture than with biological traits. However, the Díaz regime knew it had to be cautious, as previously large concentrations of Americans in Texas, would eventually lead to the secession of that territory. This precautions meant that the government had more success luring investors than permanent residents, even in rural areas despite government programs. No more than forty foreign farming colonies were ever formed during this time and of these only a few Italian and German ones survived. Mexico's northwest-pacific region (particularly Sinaloa, Sonora, and the Baja California Peninsula) experienced major surges of Northern Spanish immigration in the late 19th and early 20th century, specifically from Asturias and Galicia (Spain). Most of Latin America's colonial and industrial era Spanish immigration originates from Southern Spain and the Canary Islands, thus this regional enclave of Northern Spaniards is exceptional and remains the biggest diaspora of Asturias and Galicians by heritage in the Americas.

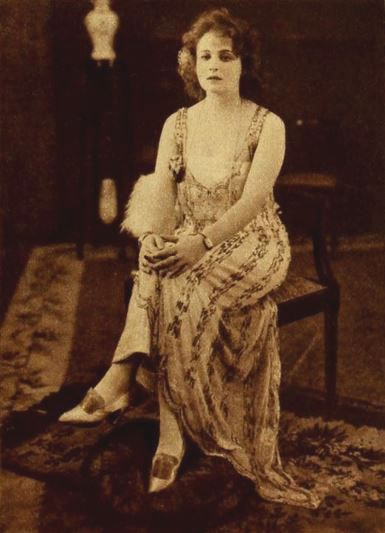
Emma Padilla is considered Mexico's first film star.

By the mid-19th century, between Europeans and ethnically European Americans and Canadians, there were only 30,000 to 40,000 European immigrants in Mexico, compared to an overall population of over eight million, but their impact was strongly felt as they came to dominate the textile industry and various areas of commerce and industry. Many were not immigrants, but rather "trade conquistadors" who remained in Mexico only long enough to make their fortunes to return to their home countries to retire. This led Diaz to nationalize industries dominated by foreigners such as trains, which caused many trade conquistadors to leave. In January 1883, the government signed a law to promote the Irish, German and French immigration to Mexico, this time with fewer restrictions, resulting in the arrival of relatively more conventional immigrants and their families. Up to 1914, 10,000 French settled in Mexico, alongside other 100,000 Europeans. Despite being the most violent conflict in Mexico's history, the Mexican Revolution did not discourage European immigration nor scared away white Mexicans, who, for concentrating in urban areas were largely unaffected by it and thought of it as a conflict pertinent only to rural people. Later on, bellic conflicts in Europe during the 1930s and 1940s such as the Spanish Civil War and the Second World War caused additional waves of European immigration to the country.

By the end of the Second World War, Americans, British, French, Germans and Spanish were the most conspicuous Europeans in Mexico but their presence was limited to urban areas, especially Mexico City, living in enclaves and involved in business. These European immigrants would quickly adapt to the Mexican attitude that "whiter was better" and keep themselves separate from the non-European population of the host country. This and their status as foreigners offered them considerable social and economic advantages, blunting any inclination to assimilate. There was little incentive to integrate with the general Mexican population and when they did, it was limited to the criollo and mestizo upper class, failing to produce the "whitening" effect desired. For this reason, one can find non–Spanish surnames, especially in Mexico City and Guadalajara. Even in the cases when generalized mixing did occur, such as with the Cornish miners in Hidalgo state around Pachuca and Real de Monte, their cultural influence remains strong. In these areas, English style houses can be found, the signature dish is the "paste" a variation of the Cornish pasty and they ended up introducing football (soccer) to Mexico. In the early 20th century, a group of about 100 Russian immigrants, mostly Pryguny and some Molokane and Cossacks came to live in area near Ensenada, Baja California. The main colony is in the Valle de Guadalupe and locally known as the Colonia Rusa near the town of Francisco Zarco. Other smaller colonies include San Antonio, Misión del Orno and Punta Banda. There are an estimated 1,000 descendants of these immigrants in Mexico, nearly all of whom have intermarried. The original settlements are now under the preservation of the Mexican government and have become tourist attractions. This region also experienced concentrated waves of modern European immigration during the 20th century such as Italian and French, and the culture of the region reflects its lack of indigenous admixture. European rooted holidays like Saints days, Carnival as well as gastronomy such as bread, cheese, and wine production remain unique to the region.

One of the few Porfirian-era European settlements to survive to this day is centered on the small town of Chipilo in the state of Puebla. They are the descendants of about 500 Venetian refugee immigrants which came over in the 1880s, keeping their Venetian-derived dialect and distinct ethnic identity, even though many have intermarried with other Mexicans. Many still farm and raise livestock but economic changes have pushed many into industry. During the Mexican Revolution, Álvaro Obregón invited a group of German-speaking Mennonites in Canada to resettle in Chihuahua state. By the late 1920s, almost 10,000 had arrived from both Canada and Europe. Today, Mexico accounts for about 42% of all Mennonites in Latin America with 115,000 practicing Mennonites accounted for. Mennonites in the country especially stand out within their rural surroundings because of their traditional clothing, Plautdietsch language, light skin, hair and eyes. They own their own businesses in various communities in Chihuahua, and account for about half of the state's farm economy, standing out in cheese production. Legal vestiges of attempts to "whiten" the population ended with the 1947 "Ley General de Población" along with the blurring of the lines between most of Mexico immigrant colonies and the general population. This blurring was hastened by the rise of a Mexican middle class, who enrolled their children in schools for foreigners and foreign organizations such as the German Club having a majority of Mexican members. However, this assimilation still has been mostly limited to Mexico's white peoples. Mass culture promoted the Spanish language and most other European languages have declined and almost disappeared. Restrictive immigration policies since the 1970s have further pushed the assimilation process. Despite all of the aforementioned pressure, as of 2013 Mexico is the country with most international immigrants in the world.

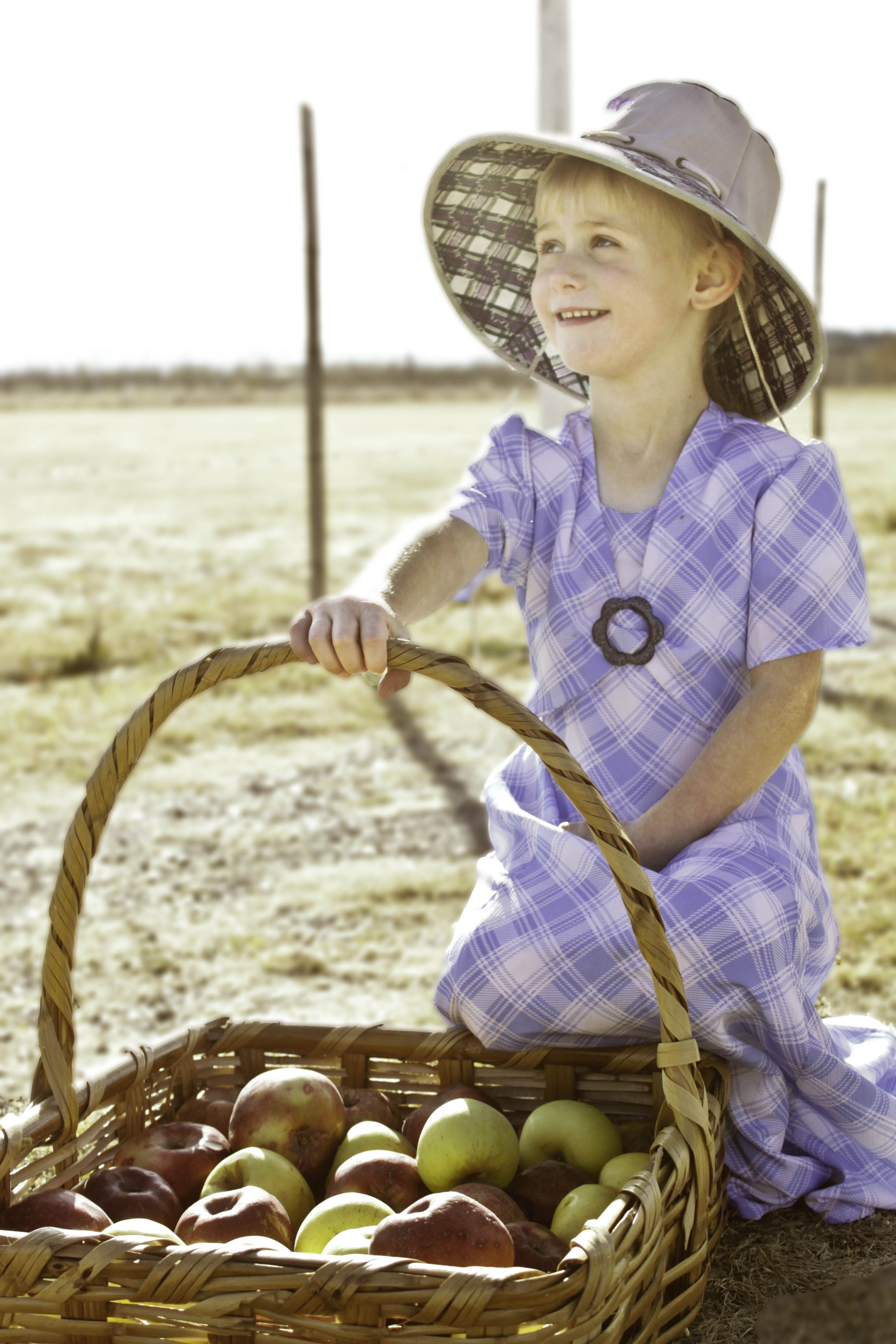
A Mennonite girl in Cuauhtémoc, Chihuahua

This widespread preference that Mexicans, even those who are of predominant indigenous ancestry, have for European cultures and values, over Indigenous ones, has come to be known as malinchismo, which means to identify or favor a North American or European culture over the native one. It derives from La Malinche, the native interpreter who served with Hernán Cortés during the Conquest, whose story still is a Mexican fable. Examples of practices considered as malinchismo in modern Mexico include Mexican parents choosing English given names for their kids, due to the desire to be associated with the United States. Due to the 2008 Financial Crisis and the resulting economic decline and high unemployment in Spain, many Spaniards have been emigrating to Mexico to seek new opportunities. For example, during the last quarter of 2012, a number of 7,630 work permits were granted to Spaniards. Other Southern Europeans joined the Spaniards in the 2010s by finding better work opportunities in Mexico with thousands of Italians, Portuguese, French and Greeks finding professional opportunities along with the Spaniards in Mexico.

Since 2000, Mexico's economic growth has increased international migration to the country, including people of European descent who leave their countries (particularly France and Spain) in the search of better work opportunities. People from the United States have moved too, now making up more than three-quarters of Mexico's roughly one million documented foreigners, up from around two-thirds in 2000. Nowadays, more people originally from United States have been added to the population of Mexico than Mexicans have been added to the population of the United States, according to government data in both nations. Immigration was restricted by governments after Diaz's but never stopped entirely during the 20th century. Between 1937 and 1948, more than 18,000 Spanish Republicans arrived as refugees from the Nationalists and Francoist Spain. Their reception by the Mexican criollo elite was mixed but they manage to experience success as most of these newcomers were educated as scholars and artists. This group founded the Colegio de Mexico, one of the country's top academic institutions. Sixty-seven percent of Latin America's English-speaking population lives in Mexico. Most of these are American nationals, with an influx of people from the U.S. coming to live in Mexico since the 1930s, becoming the largest group of foreigners in the country since then. However, most Americans in Mexico are not immigrants in the traditional sense, as they are there living as retirees or otherwise do not consider themselves permanent residents.

== Genetic research ==
Genetic ancestry of self-identified White Mexicans according to the Candela Project (2014).
1. European (53.0%)
2. Indigenous (42.0%)
3. African (5.00%)

According to a genetic study published in PLOS Genetics in 2014, DNA admixture testing revealed that individuals within the self-identified White Mexican cohort possessed an average genetic makeup of 53% European, 42% Indigenous, and 5% African ancestry.

As there is no agreed-upon genetic definition of whiteness, genetic studies have yielded inconsistent and contridictory results, even within the same location. Examples of such variations are seen in the city of Monterrey, in the state of Nuevo León, which, depending on the study, presents an average European ancestry ranging from 38% to 78%, and in Mexico City, whose European admixture ranges from as little as 21% to as high as 70%.

The Mestizaje ideology, which has blurred the lines of race at an institutional level has also had a significant influence in genetic studies done in Mexico. As the criteria used in studies to determine if a Mexican is Mestizo or indigenous often lies in cultural traits such as the language spoken instead of racial self-identification or a phenotype-based selection there are studies on which populations who are considered to be Indigenous per virtue of the language spoken show a higher degree of European genetic admixture than the one populations considered to be Mestizo report in other studies. The opposite also happens, as there instances on which populations considered to be Mestizo show genetic frequencies very similar to continental European peoples in the case of Mestizos from the state of Durango or to European derived Americans in the case of Mestizos from the state of Jalisco.

Regardless of the criteria used, all the autosomal DNA studies made coincide on there being a significant genetic variation depending on the region analyzed, with southern Mexico having prevalent Amerindian and small but higher than average African genetic contributions, the central region of Mexico shows a balance between Amerindian and European components, with the later gradually increasing as one travels northwards and westwards, where European ancestry becomes the majority of the genetic contribution up until cities located in the Mexico–United States border, where studies suggest there is a significant resurgence of Amerindian and African admixture.

A 2006 nationwide autosomal study, the first ever conducted by Mexico's National Institute of Genomic Medicine (INMEGEN), which included the states of Guerrero, Oaxaca, Veracruz, Yucatan, Zacatecas and Sonora reported that self-identified Mestizo Mexicans are 58.96% European, 35.05% "Asian" (Amerindian), and 5.03% Other. However, in 2009, the same team published an updated finding, which sampled 300 Mexicans who self-identified as Mestizos, finding the average admixture to be 55.2% percent Native American, 41.8% European, 2% African, and 0.5% Asian.

A 2014 publication summarizing population genetics research in Mexico, including three nationwide surveys and several region-specific surveys, found that in the studies done to date, counting only studies that looked at the ancestry of both parents (autosomal ancestry): "Amerindian ancestry is most prevalent (51% to 56%) in the three general estimates (initially published by the INMEGEN in 2009), followed by European ancestry (40% to 45%); the African share represents only 2% to 5%. In Mexico City, the European contribution was estimated as 21% to 32% in six of the seven reports, with the anomalous value of 57% obtained in a single sample of 19 subjects, albeit said percentage can't really be called anomalous, as autosomal studies that obtain percentages of European ancestry of 51%, 52%, 70% and 52%, exists, (with the last one being for Mexico's central region as a whole) but were not included on this publication for unspecified reasons. According to the studies that were included, European ancestry is most prevalent in the north (Chihuahua, 50%; Sonora, 62%; Nuevo León, 55%), but in a recent sample from Nuevo León and elsewhere in the country, Amerindian ancestry is dominant."

A 2007 study that included Mexicans from Mexico City reported that the autosomal ancestry of Mexicans was 52% European, while the Native American ancestry was 44%. However, the authors noted that Native American ancestry on the X chromosome was 54%. The authors stated that this is consistent with the genetic formation of Latinos, a process which involved primarily European males and Native American females.

A 2023 study analized the whole-genome 140,000 adults from Mexico City. The results show that 66.0% of their ancestry derives from Indigenous Mexican populations, with the majority coming from central Mexico (35.6%). Southern Mexico and southeastern Mexico accounted for 15.9% and 11.8%, respectively, while a much smaller share of ancestry was attributable to Northern Mexico (1.6%) and Northwestern Mexico (1.1%). Additionally, 31.1% and 2.9% of the ancestry was attributable to European (Iberian) and African (Yoruba) populations, respectively.

== See also ==
- Europeans
- White Latin Americans
- White Latino Americans
- White Colombians
- White Brazilians
- White Americans
- Indigenous Mexicans
- Afro-Mexicans
- Asian Mexicans
- Criollo people
- Castizo
- Gringo
- Spaniards in Mexico
- Racism in Mexico
- Color terminology for race
