= Mestizos in Mexico =

Mexicans of European and Amerindian ancestry

Mestizo Mexicans
Mexicanos mestizos (Spanish)
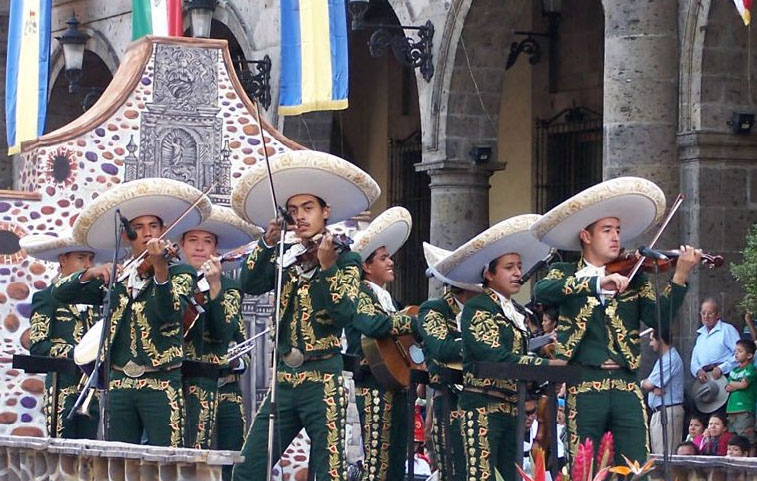
- XIII International Meeting of Mariachi and Charreria in Guadalajara, Jalisco

Total population
- Mixed ancestry predominates 51–115 million 40%–90% of the Mexican population

Languages
- Predominantly Spanish

Religion
- Majority: Roman Catholicism; Minority: Protestantism

Related ethnic groups
- Pardo Brazilians · Mestizo Colombians · Mixed Dominicans · Moreno Venezuelans · Others

In Mexico, the term mestizo (lit. 'mixed') is an identity of those of mixed European (mainly Spanish) and Amerindian (mainly Mesoamerican) ancestry. Some consider that it can be defined by criteria ranging from ideological and cultural to self-identification, genetic ancestry, or physical appearance. According to these criteria, estimates of the number of mestizos in Mexico vary from about 40% of the population to over 90% (including people of indigenous descent who do not recognize themselves as part of an Indigenous culture, and White Mexicans) who do not belong to the country's culturally Indigenous minorities. A survey carried out by Latinobarometro in 2018 found that around 58% of Mexicans self-identify as mestizos when asked about their race; a survey by Cohesión Social found that over 70% of Mexicans identified as mixed-race. Some genetic studies have claimed that mestizos make up over 93% of Mexico's present-day population, but this is disputed, with many Mexicans, including those of mixed ancestry, identifying more with static racial labels such as "white" or "Indigenous" rather than mestizo, and a large number simply identifying as "Mexican", rejecting racialized labels.

The meaning of the word mestizo has changed with time; it was originally used in the colonial era to refer to individuals who had one Spanish and one Amerindian parent. Although the caste system and racial classification were officially abandoned when Mexico became independent, the label mestizo was still used in academic circles to refer to people of mixed race. A mestizo ideology was created (exemplified by the José Vasconcelos essay La raza cósmica) holding that mestizos were the result of racial mixing, and all Mexico had to become mestizo so the country could achieve prosperity. After the Mexican Revolution, the government adopted and promoted the mestizo ideology to create a unified Mexican identity with no racial distinctions. By 1930, racial identities other than "Indigenous" disappeared from the Mexican census. All Mexicans who did not speak Indigenous languages (including European Mexicans) were now considered mestizo, transforming a racial identity into a national one.

People of different phenotypes make up Mexico's mestizo population, with many being of predominantly European or predominantly Indigenous ancestry. Since the term has a number of socio-cultural, economic, racial and genetic meanings, estimates of the Mexican mestizo population vary widely. The Encyclopædia Britannica estimate that around two-thirds of the Mexican population is mestizo. As Mexico's national identity, all Mexicans who are not Indigenous and participate in the nation's culture may be considered mestizo (culturally Mexican) regardless of racial background. The word had disappeared from the popular Mexican vocabulary long ago, since it had a pejorative connotation. Some modern academics have challenged the mestizo concept on the grounds that census data indicates that marriages between people of different races were rare; they argue that the ideology has incentivized racism rather than ending it, denying Mexico's distinct ethnic groups and cultures.

== History ==
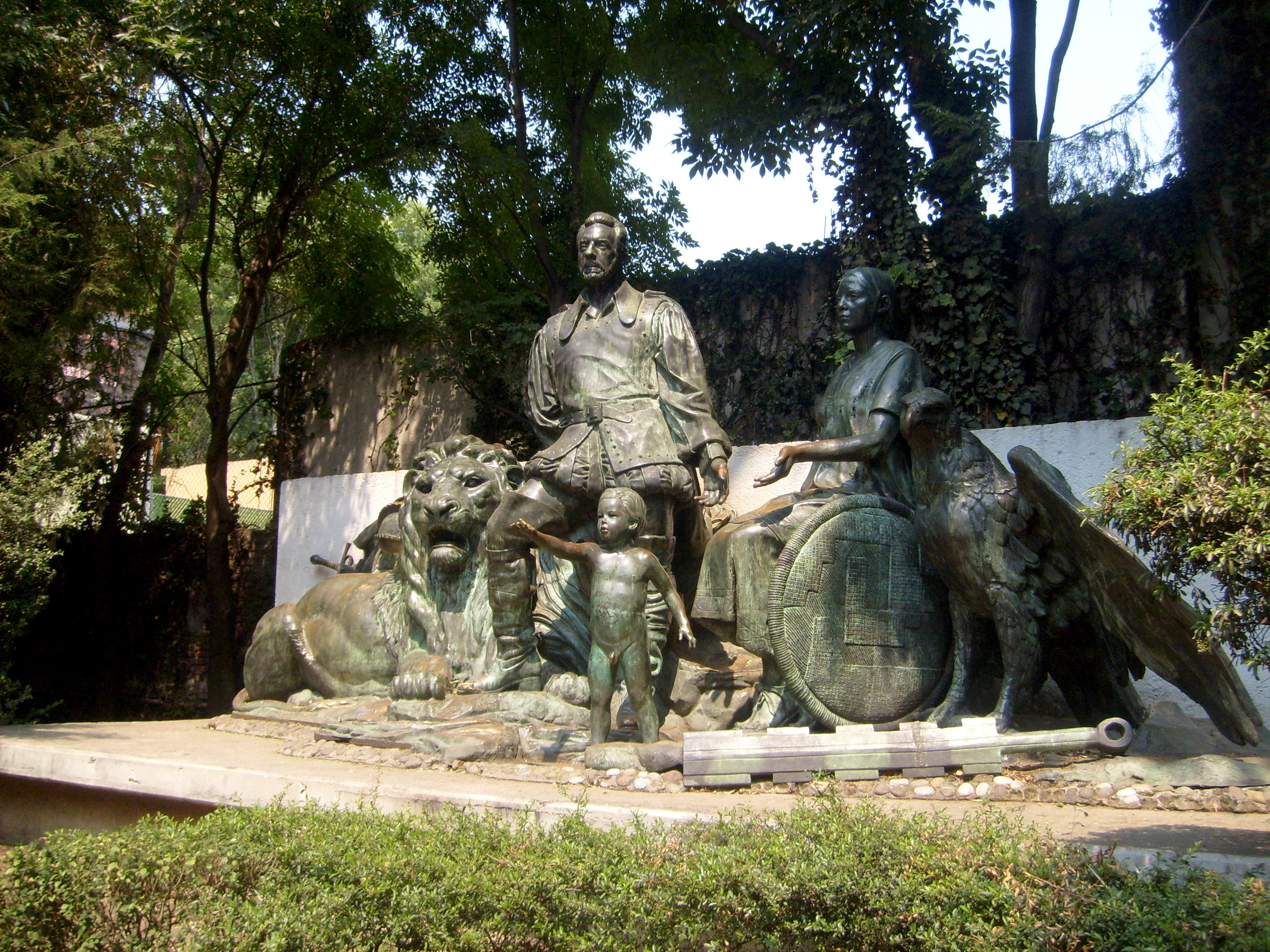
Monument to the Mestizaje in Mexico City, showing Hernan Cortes, La Malinche and their son, Martín Cortes, one of the first mestizos in Mexico.

It is not known when the term mestizo and the caste system were introduced to Mexico, but the earliest surviving records categorizing people by "qualities" (as castes were known in early colonial Mexico) are late-18th-century church birth and marriage records. An extensive caste system assigned a name to each possible racial combination; unlike later definitions of mestizo, in these records the term referred only to people with half-Spanish and half-Indigenous ancestry. The system is present in New Spain's first national census (in 1793), in which castizo, pardo, mulatto and zambo are also collectively listed as "castes". The caste system and racial censuses were legally abandoned after independence, and academics who reviewed and republished the census figures referred to the castes simply as mestizos.

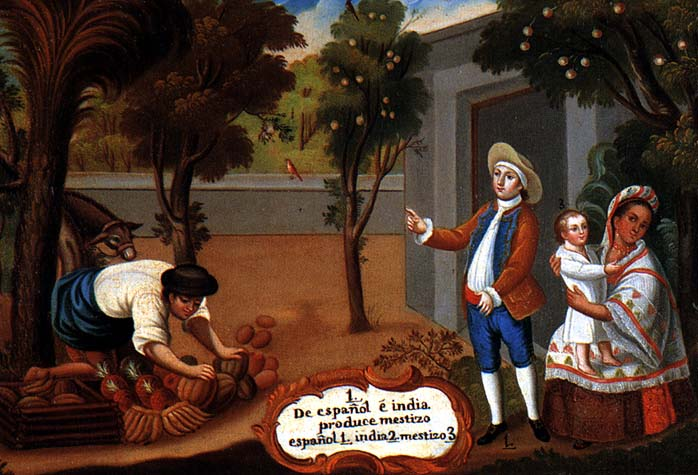
An 18th-century casta painting of an Indigenous woman with her Spanish husband and their mestizo child

A number of historians however such as Pilar Gonzalbo have questioned the existence of a caste system entirely.

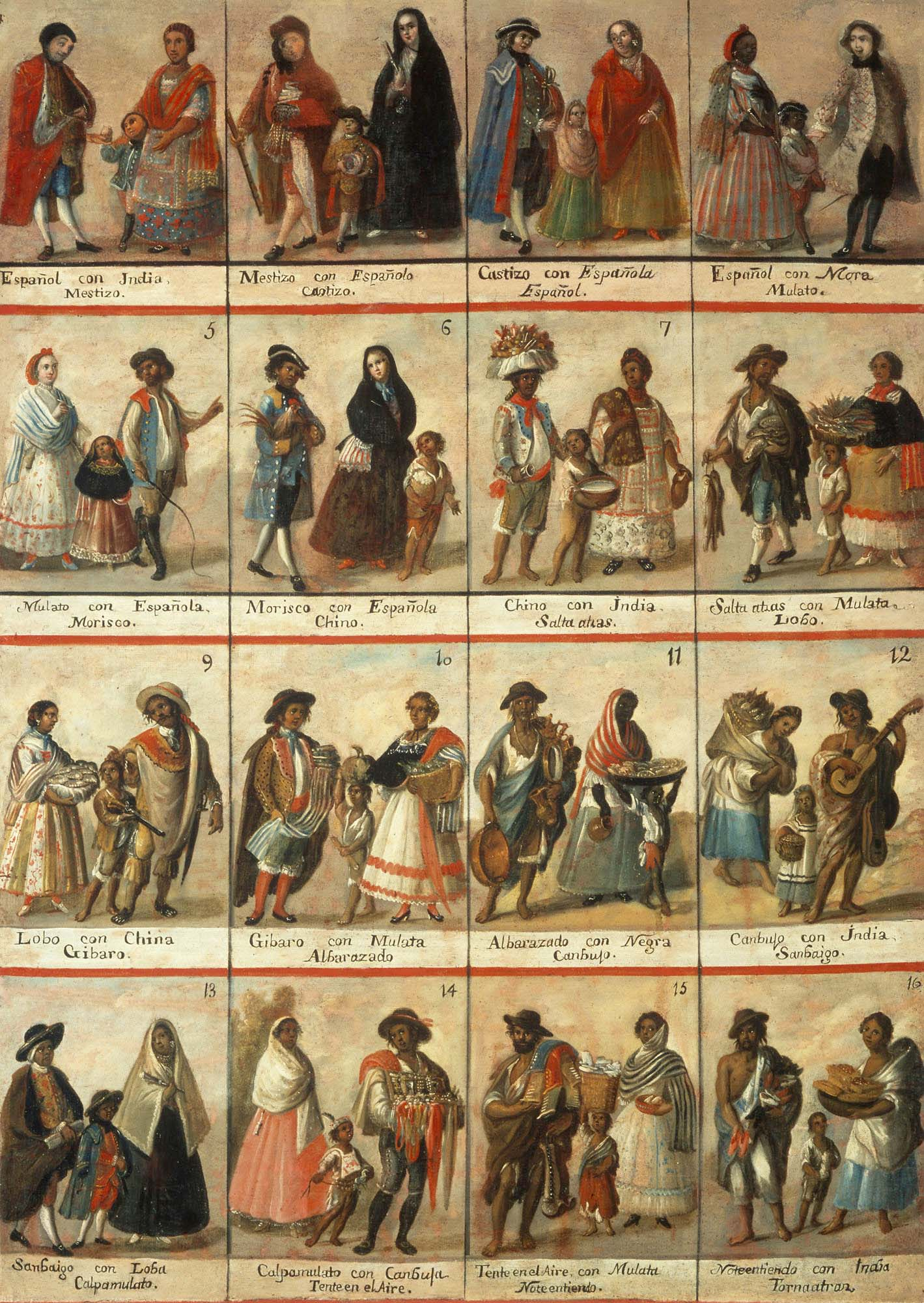
An 18th century caste painting with all 16 combinations of New Spain with the mestizo in frame # 1.

Later scholarship questions the existence of a caste system and reviews the use of terms in colonial sources. In a 2018 academic paper Laura Giraudo wrote "In the twentieth century, the prestige of authors such as Angel Rosenblat and Gonzalo Aguirre Beltrán, who unreservedly admitted the concept of society of caste, has determined the perpetuation of a myth of social stratification based on race".

The new definition of mestizo was used in the 1921 census (the second nationwide census which included a comprehensive racial classification). The census was conducted after the Mexican Revolution, when the government was rebuilding the country and hoped to give all Mexicans a unified national identity. This identity was the mestizo ideology formulated by the academics and politicians José Vasconcelos and Manuel Gamio, which asserted that Mexican mestizos resulted from mixing all the races; with the best qualities of each race, Mexico would achieve prosperity when the country's entire population became mestizo. By the 1930 census the racial classifications of "White" and "Mestizo" had disappeared, and all Mexicans who did not speak an Indigenous language were implicitly considered mestizo. The government also implemented cultural policies designed to "help" Indigenous peoples achieve the same level of progress as mestizo society, eventually assimilating them into mainstream Mexican culture to solve the "Indian problem" by transforming Indigenous communities into mestizo ones.

Although the concept of mestizo has been generally praised in Mexican intellectual circles, it has been criticized in the 21st century; according to detractors, it delegitimizes the importance of race in Mexico by saying that "(racism) [does] not exist here (in Mexico), as everybody is Mestizo." A study concluded that Mexico introducing racial classification and accepting itself as a multicultural, rather than a monolithic mestizo, country would benefit Mexican society as a whole. Other critics say that the ideology could not homogenize Mexico's races because it sought to "whiten" Indigenous peoples rather than "Indianize" whites, and incidentally erased minority ethnic groups (such as Afro-Mexicans) from history.

Outside Mexico, the word mestizo is still used to refer to people with mixed Indigenous and European ancestry, distinct from present-day Mexican usage, where a person of Indigenous genetic heritage would be considered mestizo by rejecting his Indigenous culture or not speaking an Indigenous language, and a person with little or no Indigenous genetic heritage is considered Indigenous if speaking an Indigenous language or identifying with an Indigenous cultural heritage. In some regions, such as the Yucatán Peninsula, mestizo refers to Maya-speaking populations in traditional communities for historical reasons. In Chiapas, Ladino is used instead of mestizo.

The word mestizo is not widely used in contemporary Mexican society; its use is limited to social and cultural studies when referring to the non-Indigenous Mexican population. It has a pejorative connotation; most Mexicans who would be defined as mestizos in sociological literature would probably self-identify as Mexicans, complicating their quantification via self-identification. This contrasts with ethno-racial terms such as "Indian", "White" and "Black", still common in everyday Mexican social interactions.

== Genetic studies ==
Genetic ancestry of Mexicans according to various sources
1. European (50.0%)
2. Amerindian (45.0%)
3. African (5.00%)

=== Population genetics ===
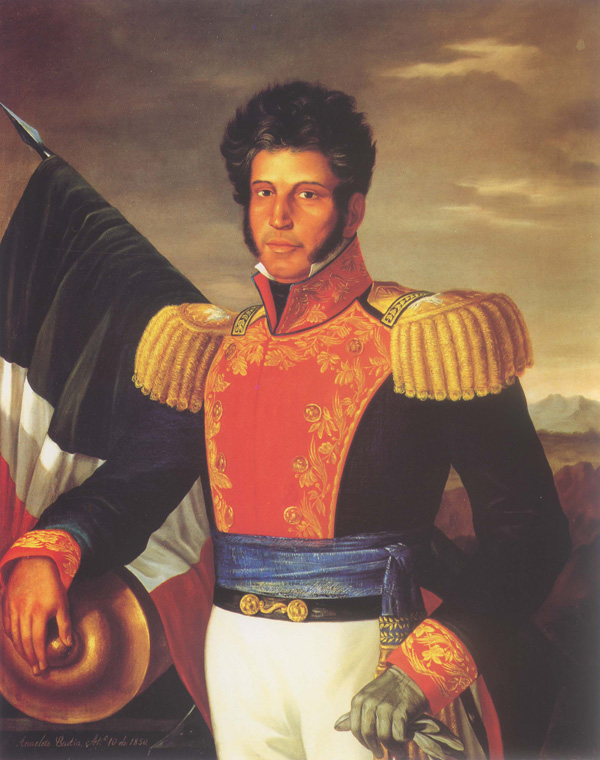
Vicente Guerrero was an Afro-Mestizo. His father was Mestizo and his mother was Black.

Mexicans who are genetically mestizo are primarily of European and Native American ancestry.

At the end of the colonial period, about 10 percent of the population (Euromestizos and Indomestizos were estimated at 1,000,000 and 600,000, respectively).

The mestizo ideology, which has blurred racial lines at the institutional level, has significantly influenced Mexican genetic studies. Since the criteria used in studies to determine if a Mexican is mestizo or Indigenous are often cultural traits (such as language spoken) instead of racial self-identification or a phenotype-based selection, studies of populations considered Indigenous because of the language spoken (like the Nahuas from Veracruz) indicate a higher degree of European genetic admixture than populations considered mestizo in other studies. Populations considered mestizo are also genetically closer to continental European peoples (like those in Durango) or European Americans (like those in Jalisco).

=== Autosomal studies ===
The genetic ancestry of Mestizo Mexicans varies by methodology and study. Typically, older studies have pointed towards a heavier European admixture while more recent ones commonly show a dominant Native American component. Admixture also varies by region, wealth, and sample size. Findings from these studies show Native American admixture being more dominant in the Central and Southern regions of Mexico whereas European admixture is greater in the Northern and Western regions of Mexico. Some Mestizos may identify as "White," which generally indicates that European ancestry is the dominant element in their genetic makeup. This identity often reflects a heritage where European characteristics are the most visible or prominent in their appearance. However, this typically does not mean they are purely European in ancestry and likely have significant native contribution. Genetic research on the Mexican population is abundant, and has yielded a variety of results. Genetic studies in the same location vary. In Monterrey, Nuevo León, studies indicate an average European ancestry ranging from 38 to 78 percent; in Mexico City, European admixture ranges from 21 to 70 percent. Reasons for the variation may include the socioeconomic background of the analyzed samples and the criteria for recruiting volunteers. Some studies only analyze Mexicans who self-identify as mestizo, and others classify the entire Mexican population as mestizo. Other studies may do both, such as the 2009 genetic study published by the Instituto Nacional de Medicina Genómica (INMEGEN) which reported that 93 percent of the Mexican population is mestizo; the remainder were Amerindian. However, the INMEGEN study only recruited people who self-identified as mestizo. Some studies avoid racial classification, including anyone who self-identifies as Mexican. This may suggest that studies that use a more inclusive classification have higher European ancestry, but at the moment it is undetermined.

Regardless of criteria, the autosomal DNA studies agree that there is significant genetic variation depending on the region analyzed. Southern Mexico has the most prevalent Amerindian ancestry and small (but higher than average) African genetic contributions; Central Mexico (where most of the population lives) leans towards the Native American component. European admixture gradually increases in the West and especially the North. In cities on the Mexico–United States border, studies suggest a significant resurgence of Amerindian and African admixture.

A 2006 INMEGEN study which genotyped 104 samples from the states of Sonora, Yucatan, Guerrero, Zacatecas, Veracruz, and Guanajuato, reported that mestizo Mexicans in those areas combined average 59 percent European, 35 percent "Asian" (primarily Amerindian), and 5 percent other. INMEGEN research has found that Mexico's mestizo population is not uniform in its genetic composition, with significant regional variation. Light-skinned mestizos predominate in Sonora, and mestizos from the central region (Guanajuato and Zacatecas) are split between Indigenous and European composition. The highest African contribution in the twelve participating states (representative of the country's major regions) was found in Guerrero and Veracruz, and the highest Asian contribution was found in Guerrero and Sonora.

However, In 2009 INMEGEN published an updated version of the study with a much larger sample size of 300 identified mestizos. The combined admixture average resulted in modest variation, with 55.2% Native American, 41.8% European, 1.8% African, and 1.2% Asian. In this group, Sonora had the most European admixture at 61.6%, while Guerrero had the least amount of European admixture at only 28.5%. Researchers in other reports have indicated that recent samples are more likely to contain a dominant Native American component compared to older ones. Researchers Francisco Salzano and Mónica Sans stated, "European ancestry is most prevalent in the north (Chihuahua, 50%; Sonora, 62%; Nuevo León, 55%), but in a recent sample from Nuevo León and elsewhere in the country, Amerindian ancestry is dominant."

According to a nationwide autosomal DNA study from 2008, by the University of Brasília (UnB), Mexican genetic admixture is 60.1% Native American, 29.8% European, and 10.1% African.

In 2014, researchers Francisco Salzano and Mónica Sans looked through approximately twenty previous studies done on the admixture of Mexicans. Their general conclusion was the average Mexican is more Native American than European. Subsequently, in 2015, a separate team of researchers performed a meta-analysis, incorporating the findings of many previous studies with additional research. This comprehensive analysis revealed a genetic composition with an average of 62% Native American, 32% European, and 6% African.

A University College London study which included Mexico, Brazil, Chile and Colombia, conducted with each country's anthropology and genetics institutes, reported that the genetic ancestry of Mexican mestizos was 60 percent Native American, 36 percent European and 4% African, making Mexico (after Peru and Bolivia) the country with the highest Amerindian ancestry of the five sample populations however this mostly used individuals from the southern region of Mexico with little representation of the north, which comprises a significant portion of the population. Phenotypical traits were analyzed; the frequency of blond hair and light eyes in Mexicans was 18.5 and 28.5 percent, respectively, giving Mexico the study's second-highest frequency of blond hair. The reason for the discrepancy between phenotypical traits and genetic ancestry may lie in the low African contribution in the Mexican population compared with that of Brazil and Colombia.

An extensive study published in 2020 estimated Mexican mestizo admixture using HLA class I and class II allele groups. The sample group was a total of 15,318 mixed ancestry Mexicans from all states of the country. Genetic estimators revealed that the main genetic components in Mexico as a whole are Native American (ranging from 37.8% in the northern part of the country to 81.5% in the southeastern region) and European (ranging from 11.5% in the southeast to 62.6% in northern Mexico).

Additional studies correlate a tendency toward higher European admixture with higher socioeconomic status, and higher Amerindian ancestry with lower socioeconomic status. A study of low-income mestizos in Mexico City found the mean admixture 0.590, 0.348 and 0.062 for Amerindian, European and African, respectively. European admixture was found to be about 70 percent on average for mestizos in one report in which they're suggested to be at a higher socioeconomic level, however, this data was published in 1978, which could make the findings outdated.

A 2011 autosomal DNA study conducted in Mexico City with 1,310 samples indicated that the average proportion of Native American, European, and African ancestry for the population was 64, 32 and four percent, respectively. Additional autosomal DNA studies conducted on people from Mexico City show a predominantly Native American background, with Native American ancestry ranging from 61 to 69 percent in five studies. The number of people sampled in the studies ranged from 66 to 984. An outlier study indicated a predominantly-European background for Mexico City mestizos: 57 percent European ancestry, 40 percent Native American ancestry, and three percent African ancestry. However, the study sampled only 19 people making it unlikely to be representative.

=== MtDna and Y DNA studies ===
A 2012 study published by the Journal of Human Genetics of Y chromosomes found the paternal ancestry of the Mexican mestizo population predominately European (64.9 percent), followed by Amerindian (30.8 percent) and African (1.2 percent). The European Y chromosome was more prevalent in the north and west (66.7 to 95 percent), and Native American ancestry increased in the center and southeast (37 to 50 percent); African ancestry relatively homogeneous (2 to 8.8 percent). States participating in the study where Aguascalientes, Chiapas, Chihuahua, Durango, Guerrero, Jalisco, Oaxaca, Sinaloa, Veracruz and Yucatán. The greatest number of chromosomes found were identified as belonging to haplogroups from Western Europe, East Europe and Eurasia, Siberia and the Americas and Northern Europe, with traces of haplogroups from Central Asia, Southeast Asia, South Asia, Western Asia, the Caucasus, North Africa, the Near East, East Asia, Northeast Asia, Southwest Asia and the Middle East. A study published in 2011 of Mexican mitochondrial DNA found that maternal ancestry was predominately Native American (85–90 percent), with a minority having European (five to seven percent) or African (three to five percent) mtDNA.

== Culture ==
New Spain developed a culture distinct from Indigenous and Spanish culture, with African and low Asian influences. After independence, the Mexican population was estimated at 50–60 percent Indigenous, 18 to 22 percent Creole and about two percent Black; the rest of the population (21 to 25 percent) was considered mestizo, an important part of the independence movement.

=== Music ===
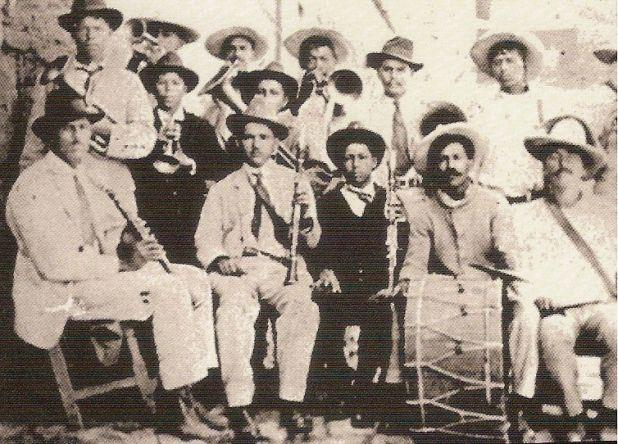
A Sinaloa band in 1900, a genre of regional Mexican music invented by mestizo mexicans.

The banda de viento is a musical ensemble primarily consisting of wind instruments, brass, and percussion. The history of Mexican mestizo music dates back to the mid-nineteenth century arrival of piston brass instruments, when communities tried to imitate military bands.

=== Cuisine ===
Mestizo cuisine combines produce such as corn, chili peppers, tomatoes, potatoes and fruits and brushes from the Americas with meat and produce from Europe such as beef and chicken, wheat, and many old world fruits. Prior to European contact, only meats such as turkeys, deer, quail and fish were consumed. Europe introduced other meats (such as pork, goat, and sheep), dairy products (especially cheese and milk), and rice into Mexican cuisine.

African and Asian influences also minimally influenced Mexican cuisine.

Mexican cuisine is an important aspect of the culture, social structure, and popular traditions of mestizo Mexico. An example of this blended cuisine is the use of mole for special occasions and holidays throughout the country. Traditional Mexican cuisine was added to UNESCO's Representative List of the Intangible Cultural Heritage of Humanity in 2010.

== See also ==
- Martín Cortés (son of Malinche)
- Bronze (racial classification)
- Chicano
- Coloureds
- Pardo
- Racism in Mexico
- White Mexicans
- Native Mexicans
- Black Mexicans
- East Asian Mexicans
- Demographics of Mexico
- Spaniards in Mexico
