= Instituto Nacional de Medicina Genómica =

Mexican research center

Coordinates: 19°17′12″N 99°09′00″W

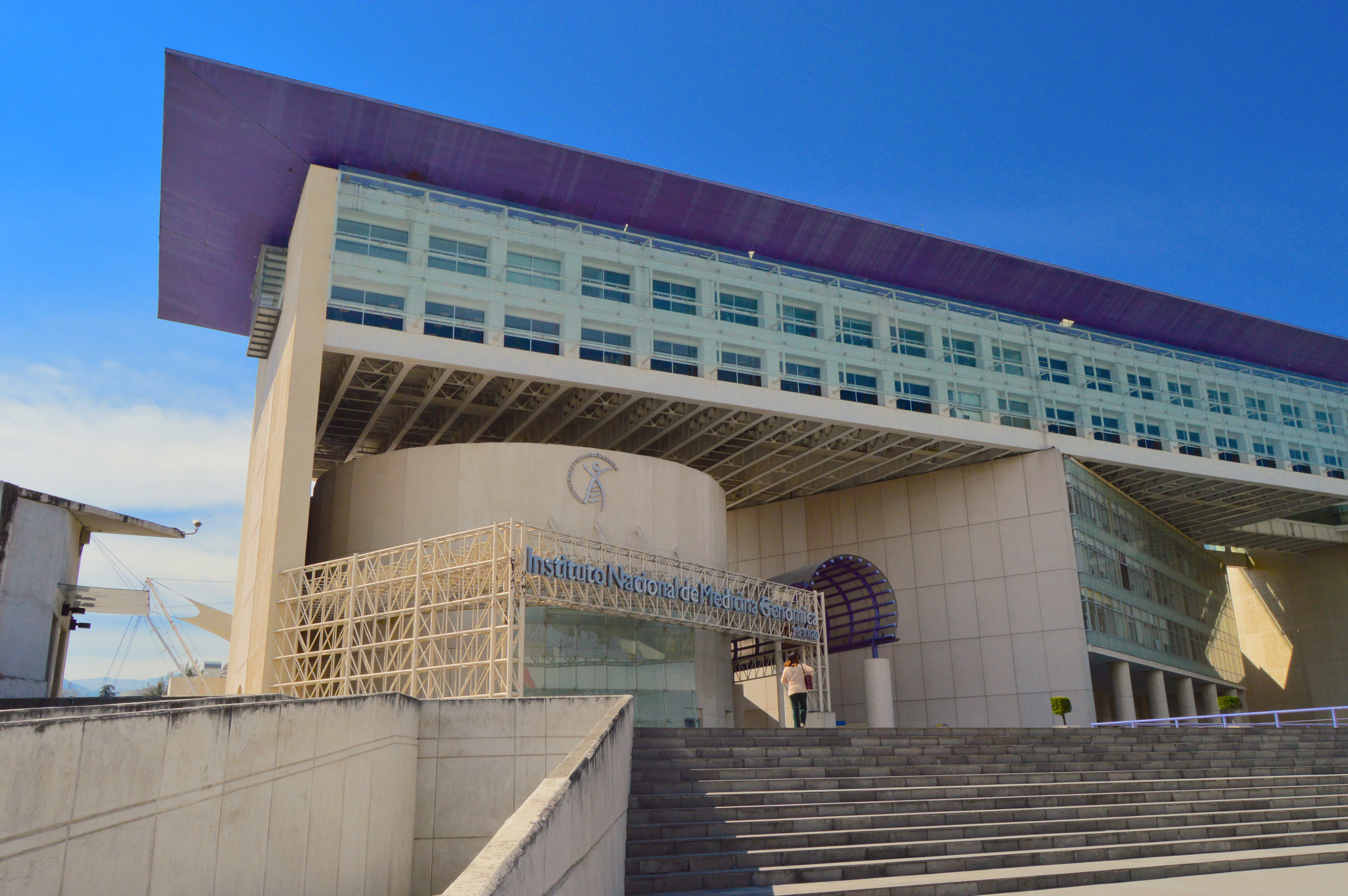
INMEGEN facilities.

The National Institute of Genomic Medicine (INMEGEN for its name in Spanish, Instituto Nacional de Medicina Genómica) is one of Mexico's twelve national institutes under the Secretariat of Health. The institute was founded in 2004, with its official headquarters built eight years later. INMEGEN is dedicated to the development of genomic medicine for the Mexican population. The institute carried out research projects aimed to improve healthcare through prevention and medical care related to oncogenomics, nutrigenomics and pharmacogenomics. INMEGEN also studies metabolic, cardiovascular, autoimmune and infectious diseases. INMEGEN collaborates with other Mexican and international institutions for the development of different projects. The current director of the institution is Francisco Xavier Soberón.

== History ==
The National Institute of Genomic Medicine (Spanish Instituto Nacional de Medicina Genómica (INMEGEN)) is the eleventh National Institute of Health founded in Mexico. It was founded in 2004 by a consortium made up the National Autonomous University of Mexico (UNAM), the National Council of Science and Technology of the Ministry of Health and the Mexican Foundation for Health. INMEGEN was the first National Institute of Health created with the support of all political parties in the Congress. The founding ceremony was led by then president Vicente Fox Quesada.

The initial investment in the project was 500 million pesos (about US$50 million), with construction beginning in 2005. In 2008 construction projected was suspended due to an audit by the federal government, but construction continued in 2009. with the main headquarters completed in 2012, eight years after its official founding. The inauguration of this building was carried out by President Felipe Calderón. While construction was taking place, researchers of the institution worked in other locations, on projects such as the Mexican Genome Project.

The current director is Francisco Xavier Soberón, who replaced the founder of the INMEGEN Gerardo Jiménez Sánchez in 2009.

The National Institute of Genomic Medicine's logo represents the sequence of nucleotides of the FOXP2 gene, essential in the development of language. It has the shape of a semicircle surrounding a double stranded DNA molecule with the shape of a human.

== Facilities ==
The National Institute of Genomic Medicine is located in Mexico City, on Anillo Periferico in the south of the city, next to the Instituto Federal Electoral. The building has classrooms, two auditoriums and a 500-person auditorium. The institute also has 18 research laboratories, 6 units of high technology, and 4 peripheral units.

== Mission ==
According to its mission statement, the National Institute of Genomic Medicine contributes to the health care of Mexican society through research projects. Its objective is not only to improve preventive medical care in the country, but also to expand knowledge of genomic medicine through research in oncogenomics, nutrigenomics, and autoimmune disease genomics, and more.

The Institute aims to follow combination of cultural, technological and universal ethics and is concerned in upholding human rights. It has regulations related to administer biological samples and genome of the Mexican population. With this regulation the INMEGEN prevents discrimination against individuals or cultures because of genetics.

== Lines of investigation ==
The National Institute of Genomic Medicine centers its attention on two main objectives, development of preventive medicine and the design of medical treatments tailored to a person's genetic makeup. INMEGEN employs approximately sixty scientists dedicated to the genome research. Currently the Institution is carrying out several different projects.

INMEGEN studies several types of cancer. These investigations involve functional cancer genomics and oncogenomics, including breast, pancreatic, prostate and liver cancer. INMEGEN studies the molecular biomarkers of early liver cancer. It is developing keys for the identification of genes which show a significant increase or decrease in their expression level of fibrosis in preneoplastic and neoplastic lesions in the liver. Other research focuses on biomarkers that help identify liver cancer in a differential diagnosis. Additional cancer studies include creating 3D models of diverse tumor cultures. INMEGEN also investigates the participation of progesterone in brain tumors and the identification of proteins that participate in the resistance of cancer cells to chemotherapy. INMEGEN is developing the cancer genome of the Mexican population. Researchers at INMEGEN also study Werner syndrome and the pulmonary adenocarcinoma.

INMEGEN has many investigations related to proteins. One example is the development of fluorescent biosensors to help detect diabetes mellitus type II as well as other metabolic diseases. Other project is the decodification of the AH1N1 flu virus, with research into the genetic susceptibility of the Mexican population to acquire this illness. In order to do this the AH1N1flu biomarkers based on protein structure need to be identified. This is useful for diagnosis, prognosis and follow-up. The institute is also working on determining the mutations that make mycobacterium tuberculosis resistant to medication. Proteomics studies involve the analysis of protein additions of lipid peroxidation at liver carcinogenesis. INMEGEN studies how proteins are affected by the immune system in papillomavirus infection.

The institution develops projects related to pharmacogenomics, which includes personalized medicine. One of the Institutions pharmacogenomics investigations is working with the doses guided by genotype-phenotype and in their standard management in patients who initiate anticoagulation with acenocoumarol.

INMEGEN studies metabolic diseases and nutrigenomics-related topics. These include obesity, especially its effects on children. INMEGEN has worked with the mutation of a gene associated with Pompe disease. This study is carried out in individuals genetically isolated of the La Huasteca area of San Luis Potosí. Another study is on the effect of Omega 3 on metabolic syndrome in the Mexican population, specifically on early biomarkers presented in the diabetic nephropathy and the risk factors for developing obesity.

The Institution has a line of research focused on cardiovascular diseases genomics. For example, INMEGEN works on gene identification in individuals with premature coronary and arterial diseases and atherosclerosis. INMEGEN studies the susceptibility of the Mexican population to acquire coronary and artery diseases. Another project is related to family cardiomyopathy in Mexican patients.

Investigations into population genomics studies the genomic diversity of the native populations in Mexico. The purpose of this is for evolution studies that may have applications in health care. It also includes the ethnic variability in multiple sclerosis patients.

The Institution works on other several lines of investigation. INMEGEN uses computational genomics for data mapping a genome for a specific purpose. In autoinmune genomics, INMEGEN investigates the risk factors for juvenile idiopathic arthritis in the Mexican population. In the case of bone metabolism genomics, the institution focuses on studying mineral density and osteoporosis in Mexican women. For the same population INMEGEN uses microRNA as biomarkers for osteoarthritis. Finally, INMEGEN investigates about asthma in children and amebiasis in the general Mexican population. INMEGEN also works on identifying the biomarkers for hypercholesterolemia.

== Collaborations ==
INMEGEN has established collaborations with both Mexican and international institutions, such as those in other Latin American countries. With the National Autonomous University of Mexico, it created a population genomics unit, which sponsors various investigations about diabetes and obesity in the Mexican population.

In 2008 INMEGEN and the Mexico City government signed an agreement for the elaboration of the complete genome map of the mestizo population of the country's capital. This project was developed to determine the predisposition of this population to diabetes mellitus and obesity. For this task, ten thousand individuals donated blood samples.

INMEGEN, like other research institutions, experiences “brain drain”, which is Mexican talented scientists leaving the country because of the lack of opportunities. In collaboration with CONACYT, they hope to repatriate Mexican scientists so they can work at INMEGEN. Nestlé and INMEGEN developed an association to work on nutrigenomics, also concerned with bringing back Mexican scientists to work at this field. Nestlé offers them a salary and paying moving expenses to make them come back.
