= Mexico–Spain relations =

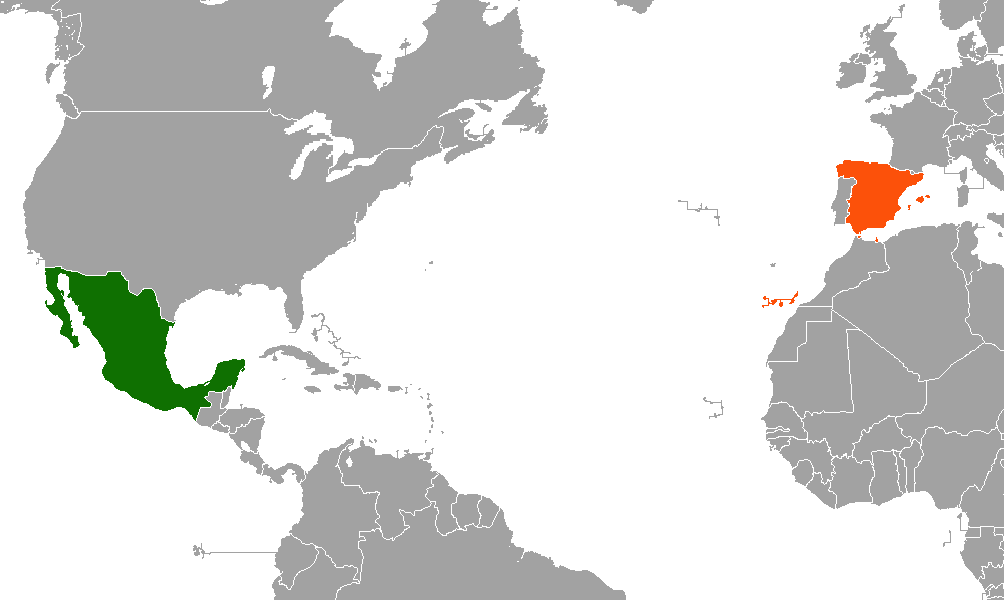

- Mexico: Spain

Diplomatic mission
- Mexican embassy, Madrid: Spanish embassy, Mexico City

Formal diplomatic relations between Mexico and Spain were established in 1836, about 15 years after the end of the Mexican War of Independence from colonial rule of the Spanish Empire. After the 1521 conquest of the Aztec Empire, Mexico City had become the centre of power of a large colonial domain of the Spanish empire known as New Spain, whose remittances of royal silver developed into a key feature of the finances of the Spanish empire.

Relations remained strained initially. They improved during the porfiriato and worsened upon the onset of the Mexican Revolution. A key international supporter of the Spanish Second Republic during the 1936–39 Spanish Civil War, Mexico severed relations with Spain in the aftermath of conflict, subsequently providing sanctuary to the Spanish Republican government in exile and to numerous Spanish refugees fleeing from the Francoist dictatorship. Diplomatic relations were re-established in 1977 and have continued unabated since.

Both nations are members of the Organisation for Economic Co-operation and Development, Organization of Ibero-American States and the United Nations. They share cultural ties and a common language.

== History ==
=== Spanish conquest ===
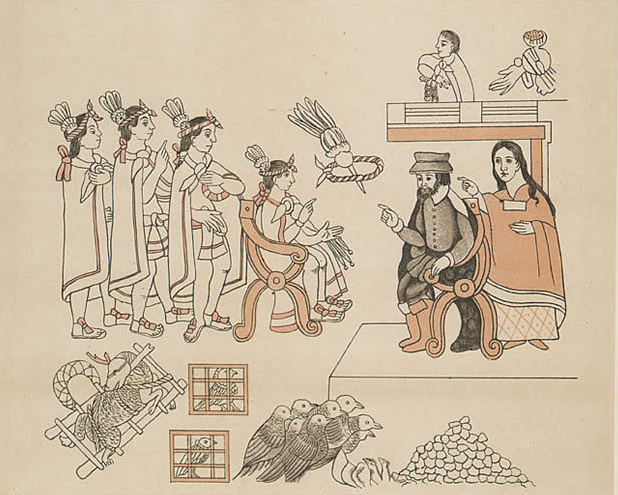
Spanish conquistador Hernán Cortés and his indigenous mistress La Malinche meeting the Aztec Emperor Moctezuma II in 1519.

The Spanish conquistador Hernán Cortés led an expedition to what is now Mexico in 1518, establishing the city of Veracruz on his arrival. Tenochtitlan, the capital of the Aztec Empire, was conquered by the Spanish and the Tlaxcaltecs in 1521. Rebuilt to present-day Mexico City, the new capital was founded as the center of power for the subsequent Viceroyalty of New Spain in 1535. The viceroyalty had a stratified social hierarchy based on race with the criollos on top, who had the most rights, until the Laws of the Indies were established throughout the Spanish Empire in the Americas. Likewise, the rights of the Aztec nobility were recognized, which lived and co-governed with the Spanish during the viceroyalty.

=== Independence ===
The late 18th and early 19th century saw much revolutionary feeling in the countries of Western Europe and their colonies. The feeling built up in Mexico after the occupation of Spain by the French Revolutionary Emperor Napoleon in 1808, and the 1810 Grito de Dolores speech by Mexican Catholic priest Miguel Hidalgo y Costilla against Spanish rule is widely recognized as the beginning of the Mexican War of Independence. In 1811, Hidalgo was executed by the Spanish militia, but his movement fought on until the establishment of the independent constitutional Mexican Empire in 1821, after the Treaty of Córdoba. The Empire was ousted and the first Mexican Republic created in 1823.

=== Post-independence ===
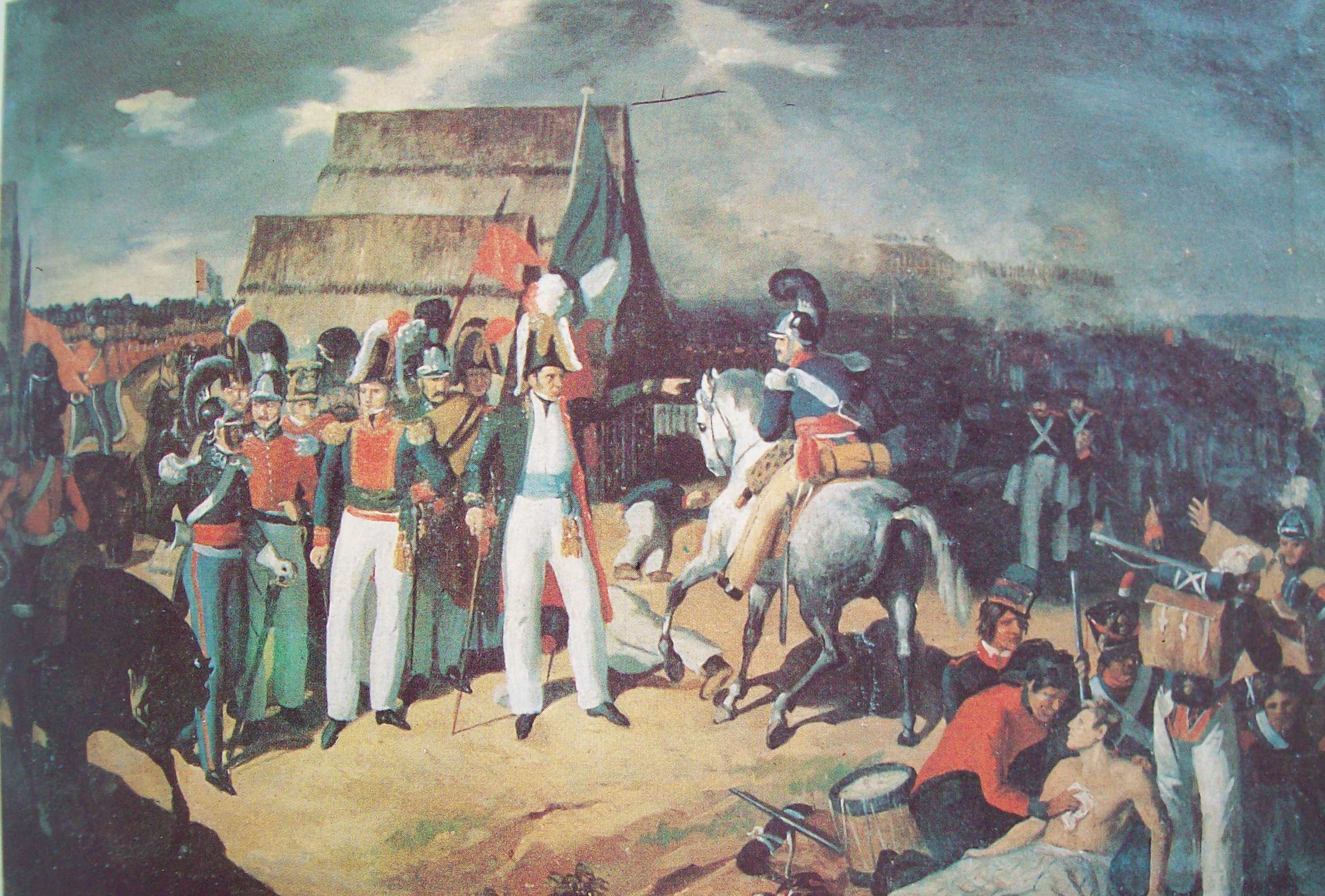
Spain fails to reconquer Mexico at the Battle of Tampico in 1829

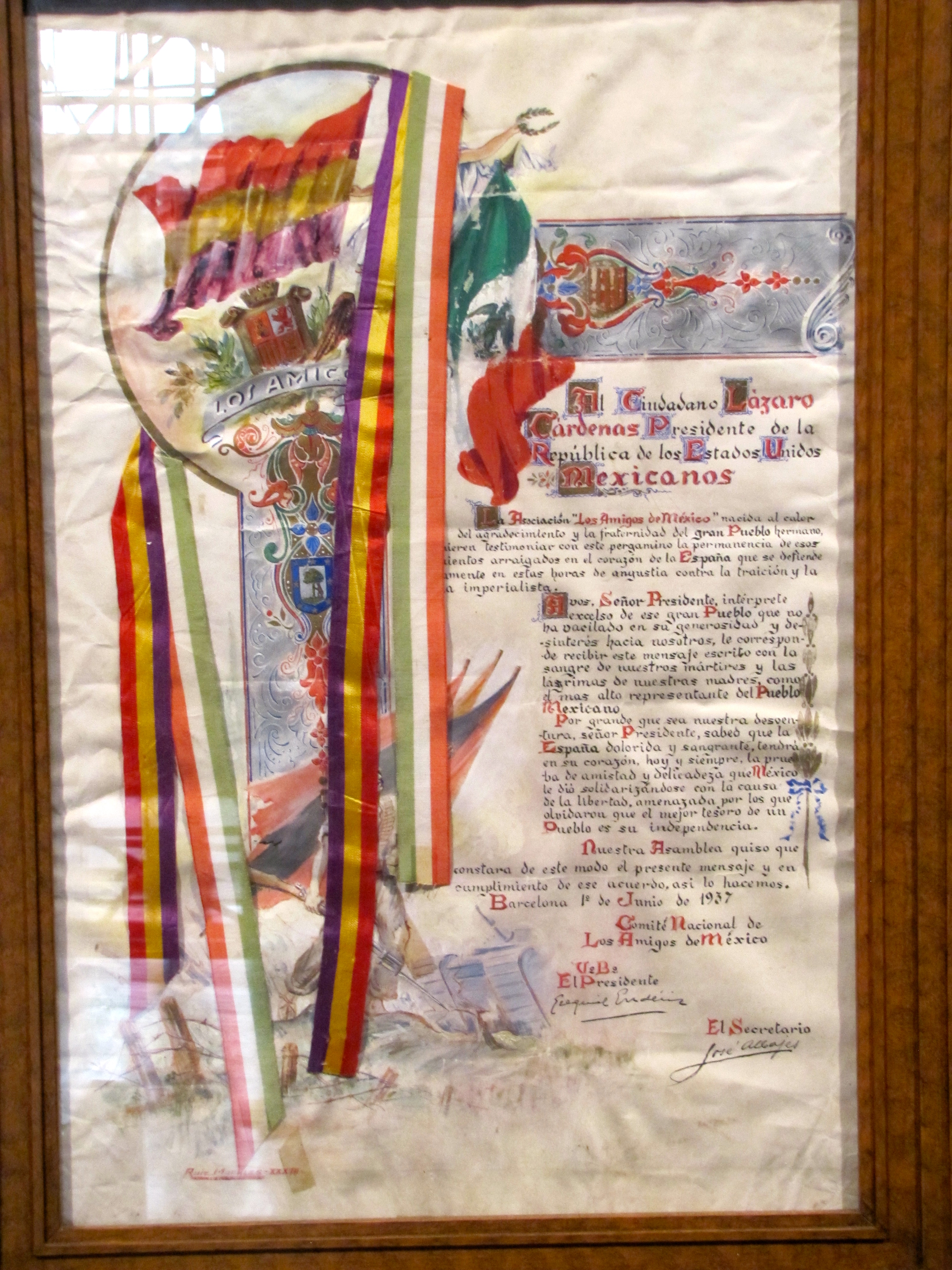
Recognition from the Spanish "Association of Friends of Mexico" to President Lázaro Cárdenas for his assistance to Spain during the Spanish Civil War, 1937.

Spain established diplomatic relations with Mexico on 26 December 1836 (15 years after Mexico had declared its independence). In the beginning, the diplomatic relationship between the two nations was strained due to Mexico having been a former colony of Spain and the latter's unsuccessful endeavors to reconquer its former colony in the ensuing years under General Isidro Barradas.

General Juan Prim commanded the Spanish expeditionary army in Mexico in 1862, when France, Spain, and the United Kingdom sought forced payment from the liberal government of Benito Juárez for loans. Prim was a sympathizer with the Mexican liberal cause, thus he refused to consent to the ambitious schemes of French emperor Napoleon III, and withdrew Spanish forces following a meeting with Manuel Doblado.

During the Spanish Civil War (1936–1939), Mexico had provided arms to the Republican faction and refuge to political refugees. Throughout the war, Mexican volunteers joined the Republican side to fight Francisco Franco. In 1939 when Francisco Franco took power in Spain, Mexico severed diplomatic relations between the two nations. After the war, thousands of Spanish refugees sought asylum in Mexico and former Mexican consul in Marseille, France, Gilberto Bosques Saldívar, issued thousands of visas to Spanish refugees and other asylees to seek refuge in Mexico. Though the Republicans had lost the war, this helped improve the relationship between the two countries after the death of Franco. Mexico and Spain re-established diplomatic relations on 28 March 1977.

Since re-establishing diplomatic relations, both nations share close and warm diplomatic relations. On several occasions, both countries had supported each other diplomatically and there have been several high-level visits and meetings between both governments including with the Spanish royal family. Soon after re-establishing diplomatic relations 1977; Spanish Prime Minister Adolfo Suárez paid an official visit to Mexico, the first ever by a Spanish head of government. That same year, in October 1977, Mexican President José López Portillo paid an official visit to Spain.

=== Relations in the 21st century ===
From June 29 to July 1, 2015, the King and Queen of Spain, Felipe VI and Letizia Ortiz, paid a state visit to Mexico. They were received by the head of Government of the Federal District, Miguel Ángel Mancera, at the City Hall Palace, where they received the appointment of Distinguished Guests. King Felipe VI attended the Mexico Spain Business Forum, in which businessmen and representatives of the governments of the two nations also participated. Meanwhile, Queen Letizia participated in a meeting with the Ibero-American Alliance for Rare Diseases. They were also received in a solemn session in the Republic's Senate, where the anthems of the two nations were sung and the guest book was signed. Don Felipe and Doña Letizia attended a lunch organized by the Spanish Embassy in Mexico, during which they had the opportunity to meet and talk with members of the Spanish community in Mexico. Their Royal Highnesses traveled to Zacatecas, where they held the closing ceremony of the "past, present and future" colloquium on relations between Mexico and Spain, at the Guadalupe Viceroyalty Museum. Mexican President Enrique Peña Nieto and his wife, Angélica Rivera, accompanied the royal couple to most of their engagements, including this last one.

On September 19, 2017, Mexico suffered an earthquake with a magnitude of 7.1 that seriously affected different areas of the country, including its capital, Mexico City, where several buildings collapsed. The following day, the Military Emergencies Unit (UME) began the progressive deployment of an Urban Search and Rescue (USAR) team with health support, communications and logistics capabilities. A total of 54 soldiers, two of them from the Army, who flew to Mexico in an Air Force Airbus in response to a bilateral request from the Government of that country. Coordinated by the Centralized Command for the Management of International Teams, the UME USAR team collaborated with the country's emergency services to rescue the greatest number of people alive and recover the dead bodies that could be trapped in the rubble.

In 2019, Mexican President Andrés Manuel López Obrador classified foreign investment in Mexico as "neocolonialist" and linked Spanish and U.S. companies without evidence, the same political situation that occurred in other Latin American countries such as Argentina or Bolivia. In January, the President of the Spanish Government, Pedro Sánchez, made an official visit to Mexico and met with the Mexican president. Both leaders commemorated eighty years since the end of the Spanish civil war and recognized Mexico's openness to receive thousands of Spanish refugees who fled their homes and found asylum in Mexico and their contribution to their adopted country. However, in March, the Mexican Government demanded a public apology from Spain for the conquest of Mexico, which was firmly rejected, both by the Spanish Crown and Government as well as by the National Indigenous Congress (CNI) of Mexico through its spokeswoman, María de Jesús Patricio Martínez, who described the petition as "a simulation" and stated that what the Mexican president should do is stop dispossessing indigenous communities of the land. In addition, 62% of the Mexican population believes that López Obrador used the conquest to do politics, while more than half of Mexicans (55%) do not consider an apology necessary for colonization. In fact, the descendants of the Aztec emperor Moctezuma II, such as Juan José Marcilla de Teruel-Moctezuma y Valcárcel (current holder of the Dukedom of Moctezuma de Tultengo), criticized the Mexican president, considering that there is no point in apologizing for something that happened five centuries ago, and that they do not want their ancestors to be used for political purposes to cause social division.

In November 2020, Spanish Foreign Minister Arancha González Laya paid a visit to Mexico. In April 2021, the visit was reciprocated by Mexican Foreign SecretaryMarcelo Ebrard when he paid a visit to Spain. During his visit, Ebrard announced that Mexico will participate in Phase 3 of the Spanish project for a vaccine against COVID-19. In addition, Ebrard announced that Spain made the decision to share vaccines with other countries in Latin America and the Caribbean.

In September 2021, Santiago Abascal (leader of the far-right Vox party) paid a visit to Mexico and met with 15 senators from the center-right PAN. Among those in attendance included PAN senate leader Julen Rementería of Veracruz, Lilly Téllez of Sonora, and Kenia López Rabadán of Mexico City. The PAN senators in attendance at the meeting with Abascal signed on to the Madrid Charter. President Andrés Manuel López Obrador heavily criticized the meeting by classifying Vox as "nearly fascist" and equating the PAN with Vox.

Later that month, former Spanish Prime Minister José María Aznar (of the center-right PP) mocked López Obrador for asking Spain to apologize for the conquest. Aznar stated that López Obrador wouldn't have his own name if it weren't for the arrival of the Spanish. He went on to mock his name by saying Andrés was on behalf of the Aztecs, Manuel on behalf of the Mayas, López being an Inca mix, and Obrador being from Santander. López Obrador refused to directly respond to Aznar, instead calling for "love and peace" between the Mexican and Spanish people.

In February 2022, Mexican president López Obrador proposed a "pause" in the bilateral relations between both countries, in light of alleged mispractices of Spanish companies in Mexico during previous administrations. The Spanish Government issued a notice categorically rejecting the offences against Spain and Spanish companies, arguing that both countries are "strategic partners" while noting that the Spanish government wishes for "relations based on mutual respect".

In March 2022, the Spanish Foreign Minister José Manuel Albares traveled to Mexico and together with the Mexican Foreign Secretary, Marcelo Ebrard, both countries have agreed to “accelerate the relationship” between the two countries instead of taking a pause as requested in February 2022 by President López Obrador. During the meeting, the two foreign ministers signed four agreements on political, cultural, scientific and cooperation in the rights of women.

In April 2026, Mexican President Claudia Sheinbaum and Foreign Secretary Roberto Velasco Álvarez traveled to Barcelona to attend the Defense of Democracy summit and met with Spanish Prime Minister Pedro Sánchez. During her visit to Barcelona, President Sheinbaum also visited the Barcelona Supercomputing Center to view the "Coatlicue" supercomputer—a system designed to analyze millions of data points using thousands of processors operating simultaneously. Coatlicue is a joint Spanish-Mexican project intended to address public challenges requiring extensive data analysis capabilities in the fields of the environment, energy, health, and other public sector needs. That same month, Spanish Foreign Minister José Manuel Albares paid a visit to Mexico and met with President Sheinbaum.

In June 2026, Spanish King Felipe VI traveled to Mexico and met with President Sheinbaum. The visit marked a turning point in relations between both nations. In November 2026, Mexican Foreign Secretary, Roberto Velasco Álvarez, traveled to Madrid to attend the 30th Ibero-American Summit.

== High-level visits ==
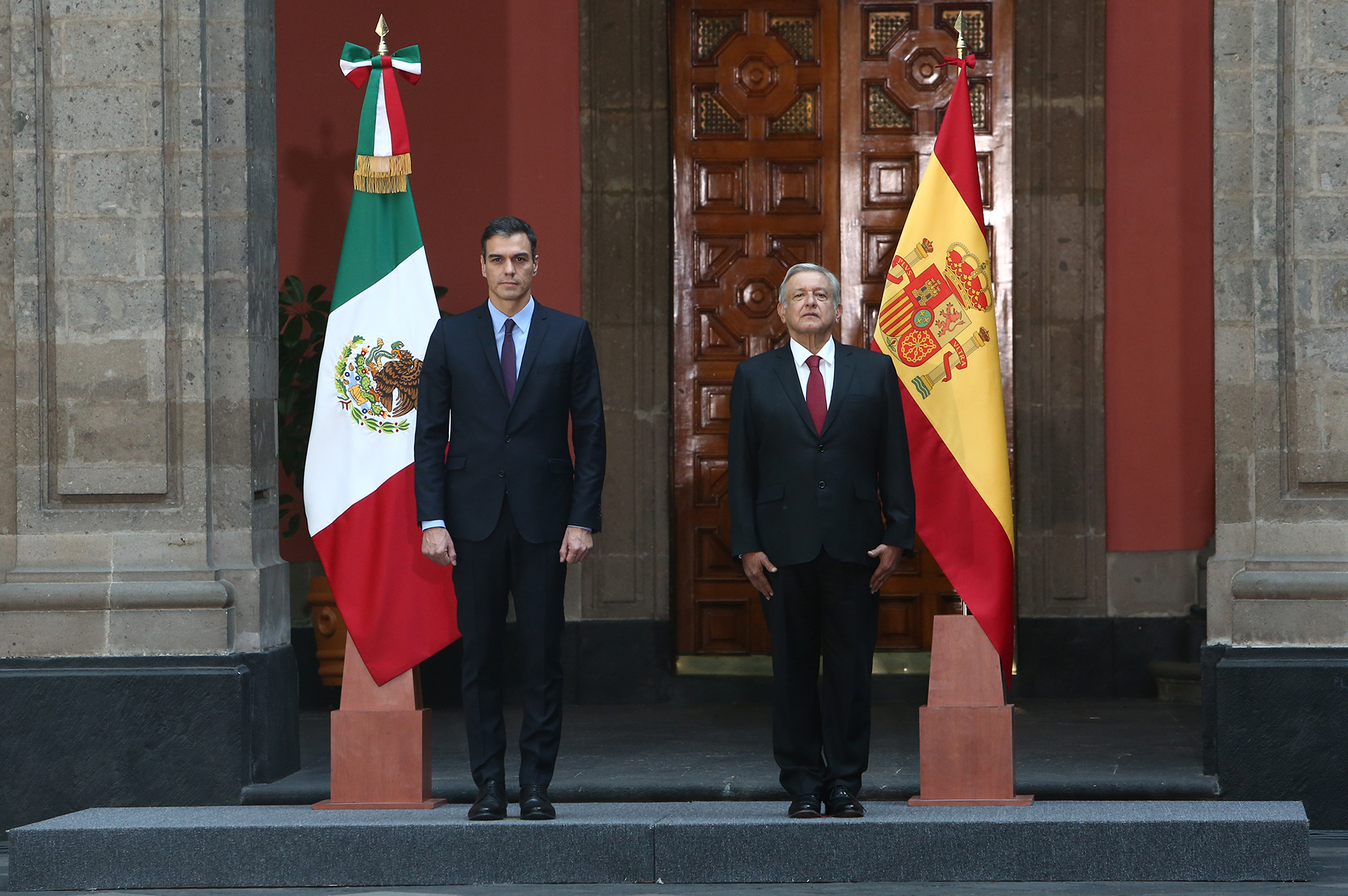
Mexican President Andrés Manuel López Obrador and Spanish Prime Minister Pedro Sánchez in Mexico City; January 2019.

Presidential visits from Mexico to Spain

- President José López Portillo (1977)
- President Miguel de la Madrid (1985)
- President Carlos Salinas de Gortari (1992)
- President Ernesto Zedillo (1996, 2000)
- President Vicente Fox (2001, 2002, 2005, 2006)
- President Felipe Calderón (2007, 2008, 2010, 2012)
- President Enrique Peña Nieto (2014, 2018)
- President Claudia Sheinbaum (2026)

Royal and Prime Ministerial visits from Spain to Mexico

- Prime Minister Adolfo Suárez (1977)
- King Juan Carlos I (1978, 1990, 1991, 1993, 1997, 2002)
- Prime Minister Leopoldo Calvo-Sotelo (1981)
- Queen Sofía of Spain (1983, 1985, 2000)
- Prime Minister Felipe González (1985, 1987, 1991)
- Crowned Prince Felipe (1991, 2000, 2004, 2006, 2008, 2012)
- Prime Minister José María Aznar (1996, 2001, 2002, 2003)
- Prime Minister José Luis Rodríguez Zapatero (2004, 2007)
- Prime Minister Mariano Rajoy (April and June 2012, 2014)
- King Felipe VI (2014, 2015, 2018, 2026)
- Queen Letizia (2017)
- Prime Minister Pedro Sánchez (2019)

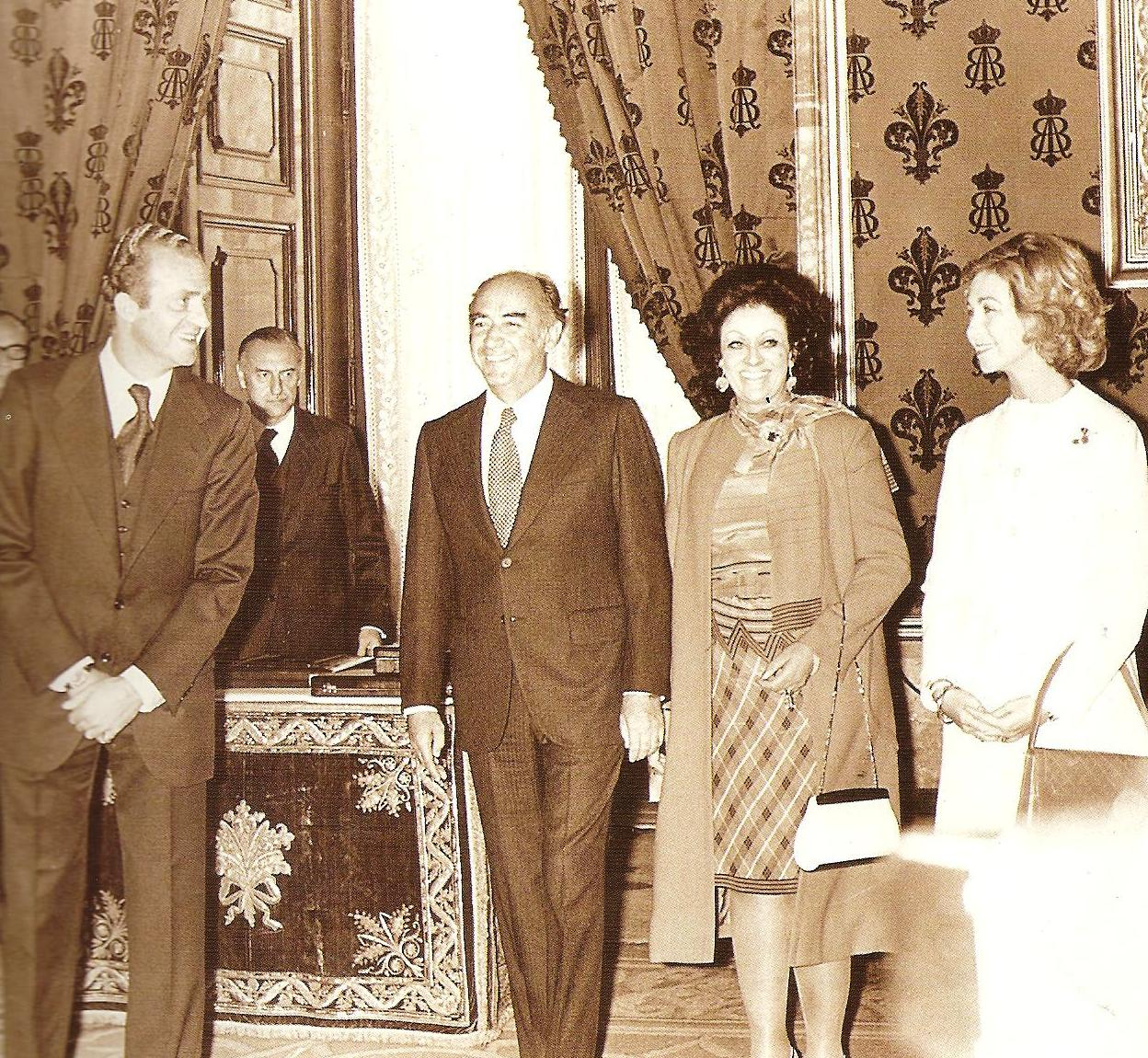
President José López Portillo and his wife with King Juan Carlos I and Queen Sofía in Madrid, October 1977.

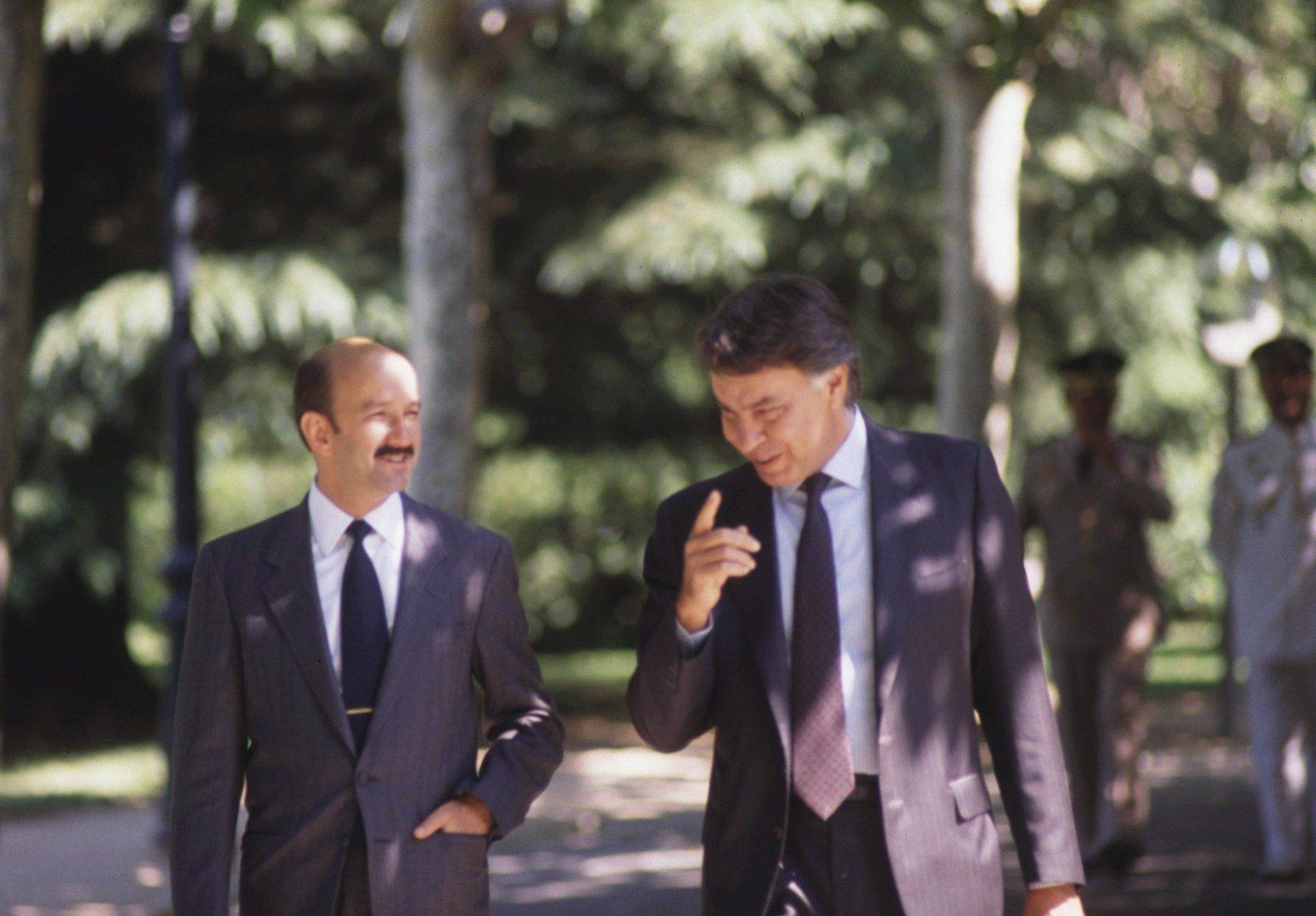
President Carlos Salinas de Gortari and Prime Minister Felipe González in Madrid, 1989.

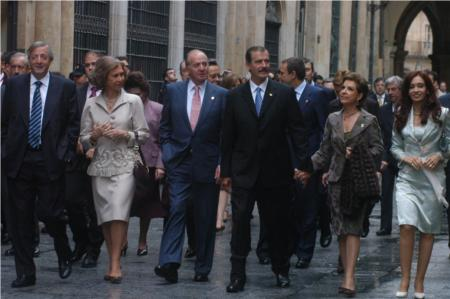
President Vicente Fox, King Juan Carlos I and Argentine President Néstor Kirchner in Salamanca, October 2005.

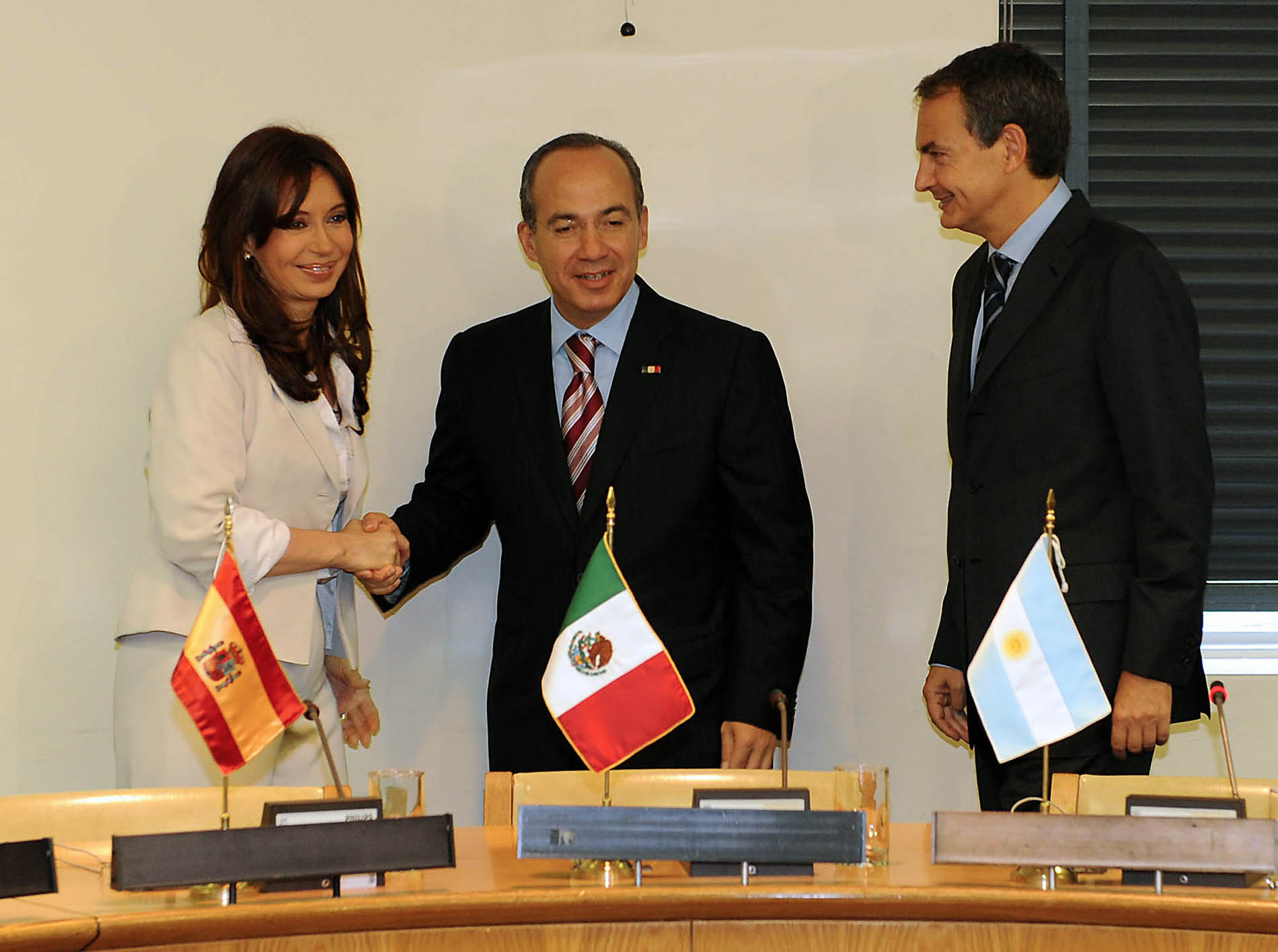
Presidente Felipe Calderón, Argentine President Cristina Fernández and Prime Minister José Luis Rodríguez Zapatero in New York, 2009.

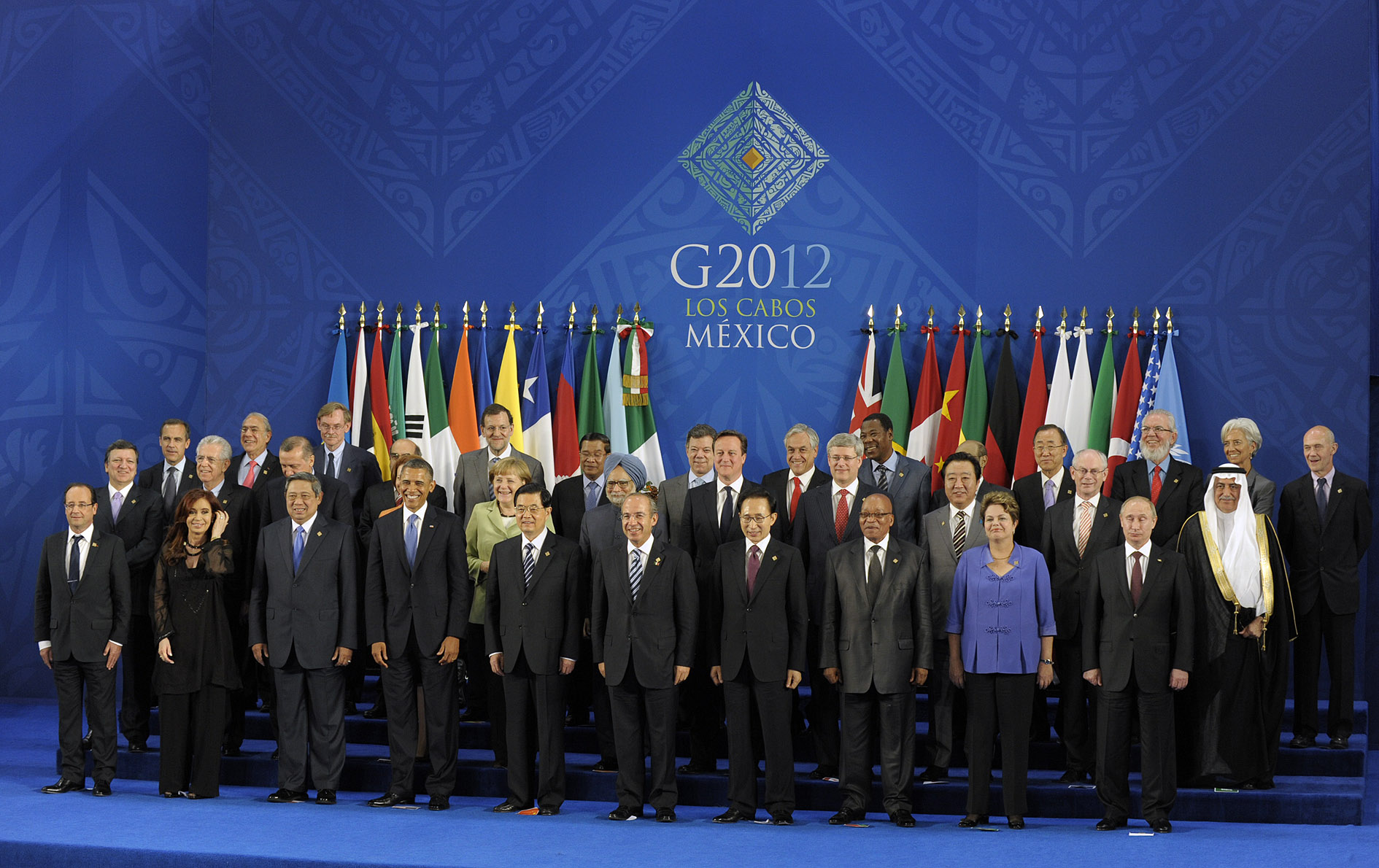
President Felipe Calderón and Prime Minister Mariano Rajoy in Los Cabos, 2012.

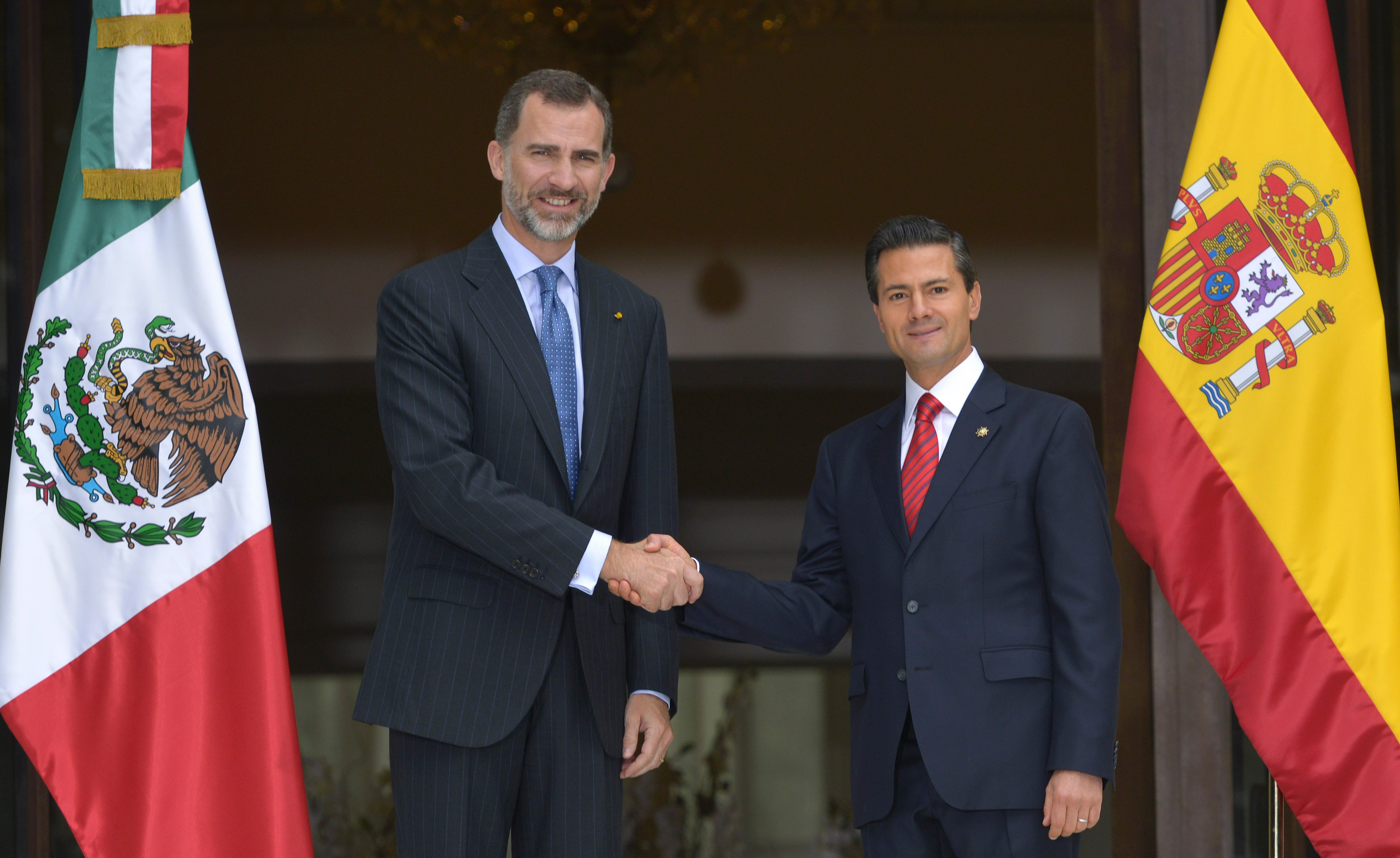
King Felipe VI and President Enrique Peña Nieto in Mexico City, 2015.

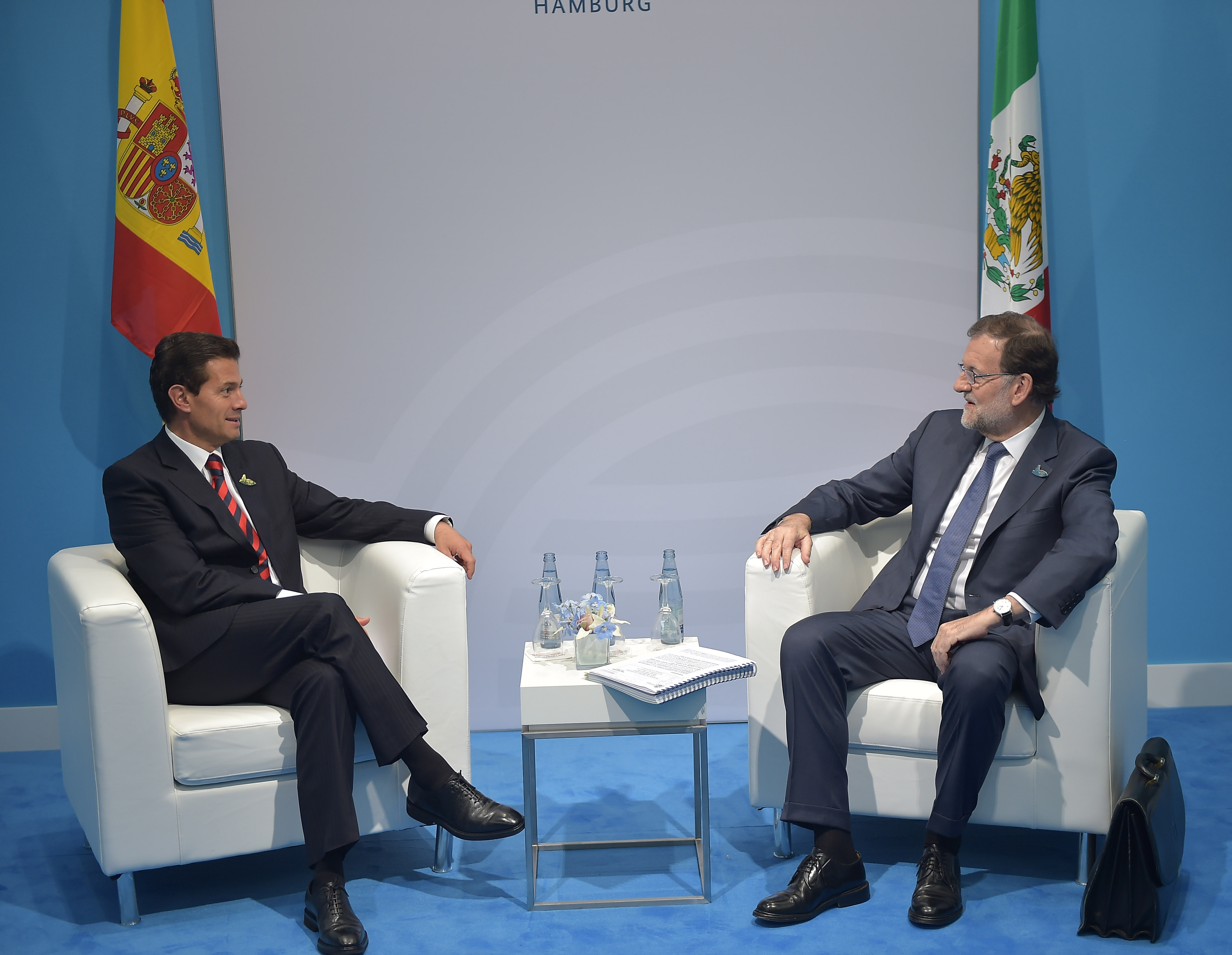
President Enrique Peña Nieto and Prime Minister Mariano Rajoy in Hamburg, 2017.

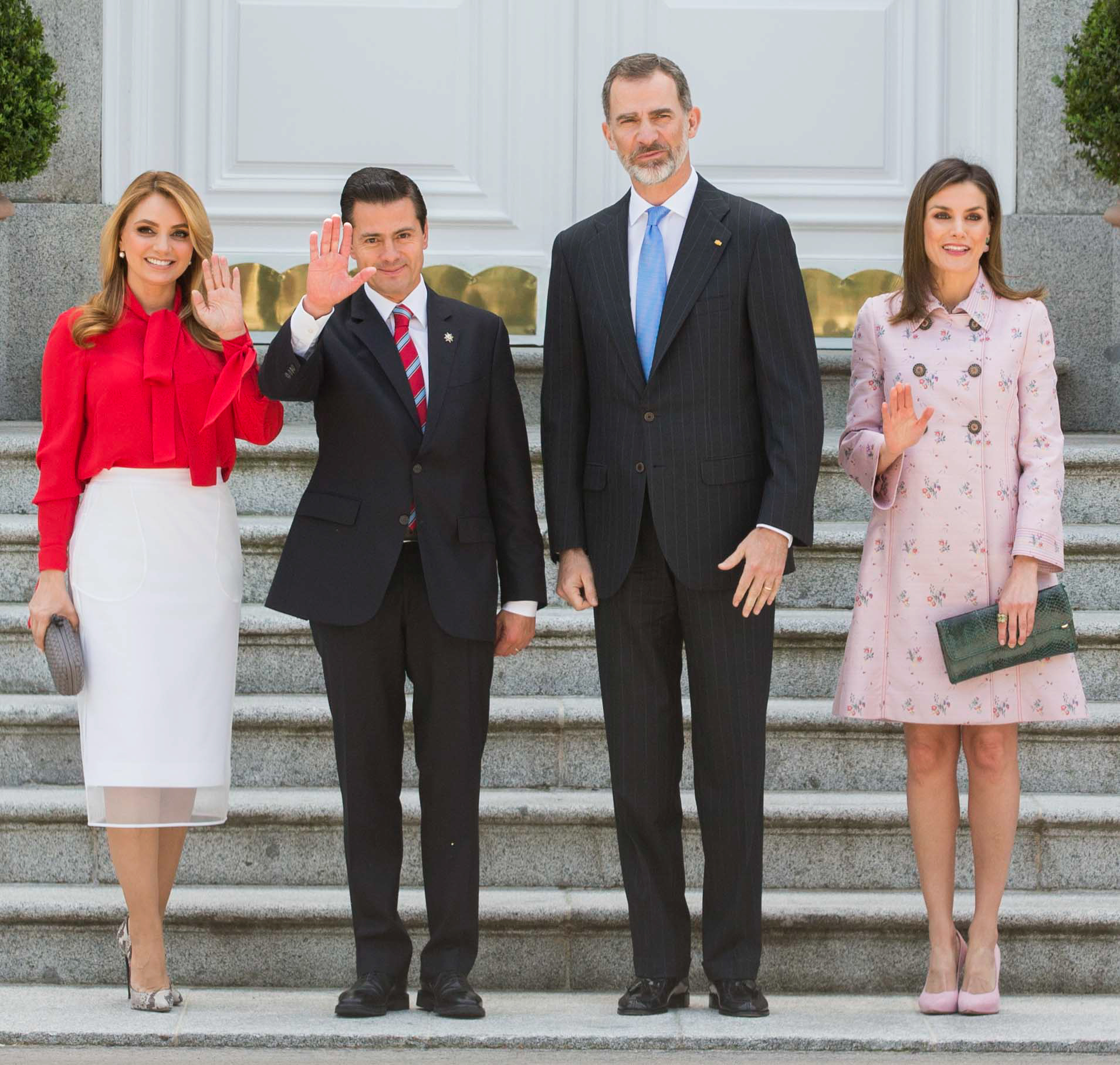
President Enrique Peña Nieto and King Felipe VI in Madrid, 2018.

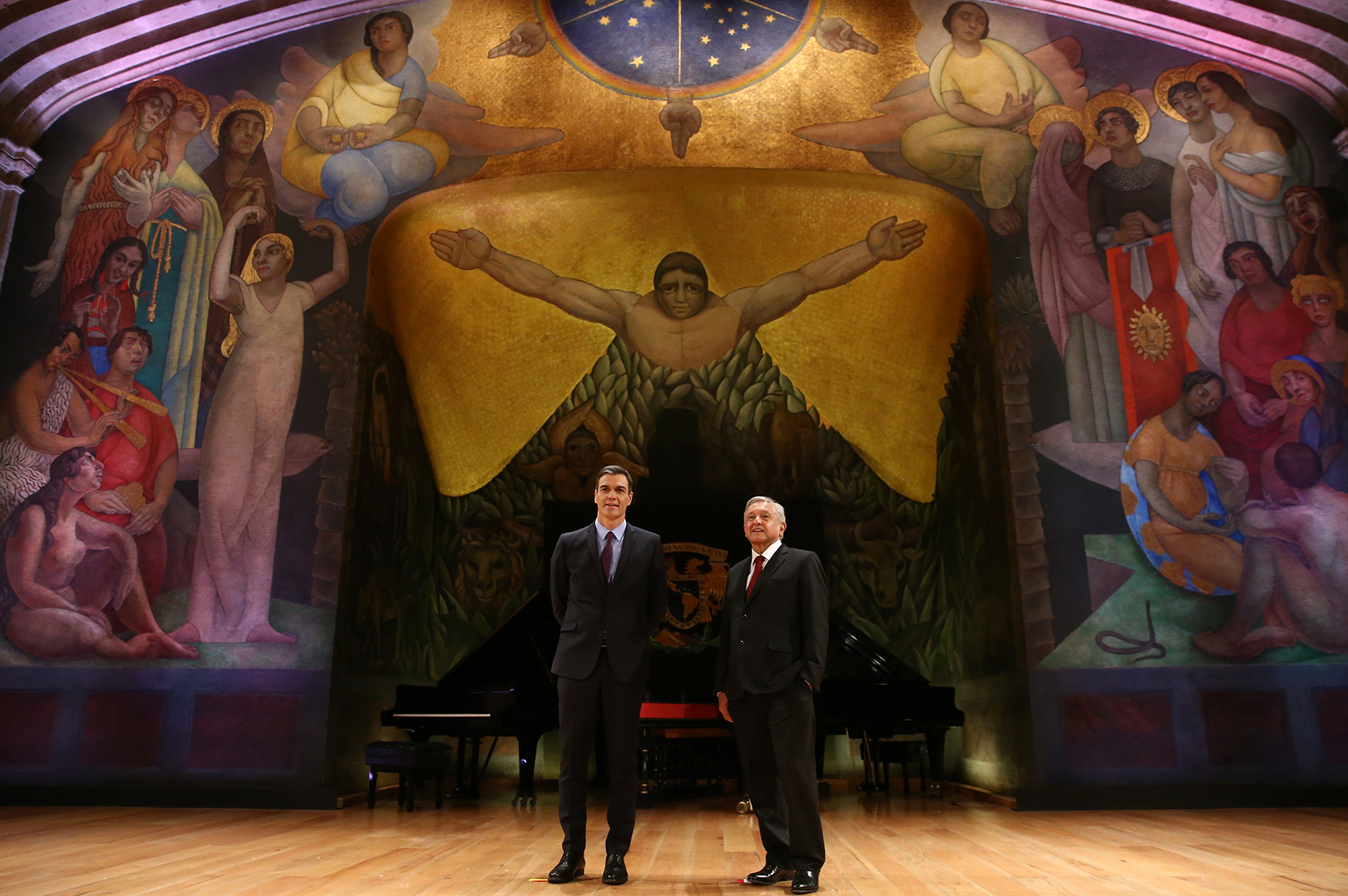
Prime Minister Pedro Sánchez and President Andrés Manuel López Obrador in Mexico City, 2019.

=== Timeline ===
| Mexican President | | Spanish Prime Minister | | Overlap Timeline |
| Name | Party | Name | Party | Overlap Timeline |
|---|---|---|---|---|
| Luis Echeverría Álvarez | PRI | Adolfo Suárez González | UCD | 5 July 1976 – 30 November 1976 |
| José López Portillo y Pacheco | PRI | Adolfo Suárez González | UCD | 1 December 1976 – 26 February 1981 |
| José López Portillo y Pacheco | PRI | Leopoldo Calvo-Sotelo | UCD | 26 February 1981 – 30 November 1982 |
| Miguel de la Madrid Hurtado | PRI | Leopoldo Calvo-Sotelo | UCD | 1 December 1982 – 2 December 1982 |
| Miguel de la Madrid Hurtado | PRI | Felipe González Márquez | PSOE | 2 December 1982 – 30 November 1988 |
| Carlos Salinas de Gortari | PRI | Felipe González Márquez | PSOE | 1 December 1988 – 30 November 1994 |
| Ernesto Zedillo Ponce de León | PRI | Felipe González Márquez | PSOE | 1 December 1994 – 5 May 1996 |
| Ernesto Zedillo Ponce de León | PRI | José Maria Aznar López | PP | 5 May 1996 – 30 November 2000 |
| Vicente Fox Quesada | PAN | José Maria Aznar López | PP | 1 December 2000 – 17 April 2004 |
| Vicente Fox Quesada | PAN | José Luis Rodríguez Zapatero | PSOE | 17 April 2004 – 30 November 2006 |
| Felipe Calderón Hinojosa | PAN | José Luis Rodríguez Zapatero | PSOE | 1 December 2006 – 21 December 2011 |
| Felipe Calderón Hinojosa | PAN | Mariano Rajoy Brey | PP | 21 December 2011 – 30 November 2012 |
| Enrique Peña Nieto | PRI | Mariano Rajoy Brey | PP | 1 December 2012 – 1 June 2018 |
| Enrique Peña Nieto | PRI | Pedro Sánchez Pérez-Castejón | PSOE | 1 June 2018 – 30 November 2018 |
| Andrés Manuel López Obrador | MORENA | Pedro Sánchez Pérez-Castejón | PSOE | 1 December 2018 – 30 September 2024 |
| Claudia Sheinbaum Pardo | MORENA | Pedro Sánchez Pérez-Castejón | PSOE | 1 October 2024 – present |

== Bilateral agreements ==
Over the years, both nations have signed numerous bilateral agreements and treaties such as an Agreement on Scientific and Technical Cooperation (1977); Agreement on the elimination of visas (1977); Agreement on Cultural and Educational Cooperation (1978); Agreement on Nuclear Energy Cooperation for peaceful purposes (1979); Air Transportation Agreement (1979); Agreement on Economic and Commercial Cooperation (1980); Extradition Treaty (1984); Agreement on the Avoidance of Double-Taxation (1984); Tourism Agreement (1996); Agreement on the Promotion and Protection of Investments (1997); Agreement on Cooperation between the Bank of Mexico and Bank of Spain (2014) and an Agreement on Cooperation against Organized Crime (2014).

== Transport and tourism ==
There are direct flights between Mexico and Spain through the following airlines: Aeroméxico, Air Europa, Emirates, Iberia, Iberojet, Wamos Air and World2Fly. The Madrid-Mexico City flight route, operated by Iberia and Aeroméxico, is the busiest transatlantic flight departing Latin America.

In 2025, more than a million Mexican citizens travelled to Spain for tourism. Mexico sends the second highest number of tourists to Spain outside of Europe (and behind the United States). During the same period, more than 370,000 Spanish citizens visited Mexico, becoming the 6th highest country to send tourists to the country.

== Cultural cooperation ==
Both countries have established cultural centers in their respective capitals in order to promote the development of both Mexico and Spain, through greater knowledge of both nations in cultural, business, entrepreneurship, tourism, gastronomic, and community development issues.

Spain is the European country with which Mexico has traditionally held the largest academic exchange. Both countries actively promote the Spanish language as a symbol of common identity and heritage. In 2015, the kings of Spain witnessed the signing of an agreement between the National Autonomous University of Mexico (UNAM), the Instituto Cervantes and the University of Salamanca, to implement the National Service for the Evaluation of the Spanish Language (SIELE) in Mexico, which allows accrediting the command and level of Spanish of any user electronically.

Mariachi and flamenco are two genres of Latin music, recognized as intangible cultural heritage, being emblems of Mexican and Spanish culture respectively. Likewise, they have become popular among the societies of both countries with the exchange of music and dance artists.

In May 2022, the Mexican Congress installed a friendship group with Spain. The president of the group, deputy Anuar Roberto Azuar of the PAN, described as "necessary and timely" the meeting with the Spanish ambassador, Juan López-Doriga Pérez, who went to the Lower House of Congress to sign the agreement. In the same month, within the framework of the celebration of the 45th anniversary of the reestablishment of relations between the two countries, Mexico reinforced cultural promotion and academic cooperation with Spain. In addition, in October, the Undersecretary of Foreign Affairs of Mexico, Carmen Moreno Toscano, made a working visit to Spain with the aim of expanding the "key" political dialogue between the two countries and stressed that the bilateral relationship is "broad, solid and dynamic, for the bonds of friendship and the desire for cooperation between the two countries”, and "which is extremely rich, not only because of our common history and culture, but also because of our commercial and human exchanges".

Descendants of Aztec royalty live in Spain and retain titles of nobility. In May 2022, the Mexican archaeologist responsible for the excavation of Tenochtitlan, Eduardo Matos Moctezuma, was distinguished with the Princess of Asturias Award for Social Sciences and argued that both countries should further strengthen their relations. Likewise, in October, he stated that "Spain and Mexico are linked by indissoluble ties" and that "they must move towards a promising future".

Since June 2022, the Group of World Heritage Cities of Spain and the National Association of Mexican World Heritage Cities have agreed to strengthen their relations with the aim of promoting mutual cooperation and the exchange of information, experiences and good practices in matters related to the defense of heritage, culture, and tourism promotion. This agreement has been reflected in the signing of a letter of intent signed by the president of the Group of World Heritage Cities of Spain, Carlos García Carbayo, and the president of the Mexican association, Loredana Montes, after holding a meeting that they have kept in the headquarters of the Historic Center Trust of Mexico City.

In 2022, it was the 40th anniversary of the signing of the twinning between the city of Guadalajara in Castilla-La Mancha (Spain) and the corresponding Guadalajara in Jalisco (Mexico). Likewise, the twinning of the city of Valladolid in Castile and León (Spain) with its counterpart Valladolid in Yucatán (Mexico) was established, so that both cities have been linked institutionally, promoting human contact and the cultural ties of each culture.

In February 2023, the twinning of the Sanctuaries dedicated to the Virgin of Guadalupe in Mexico and Spain was signed.

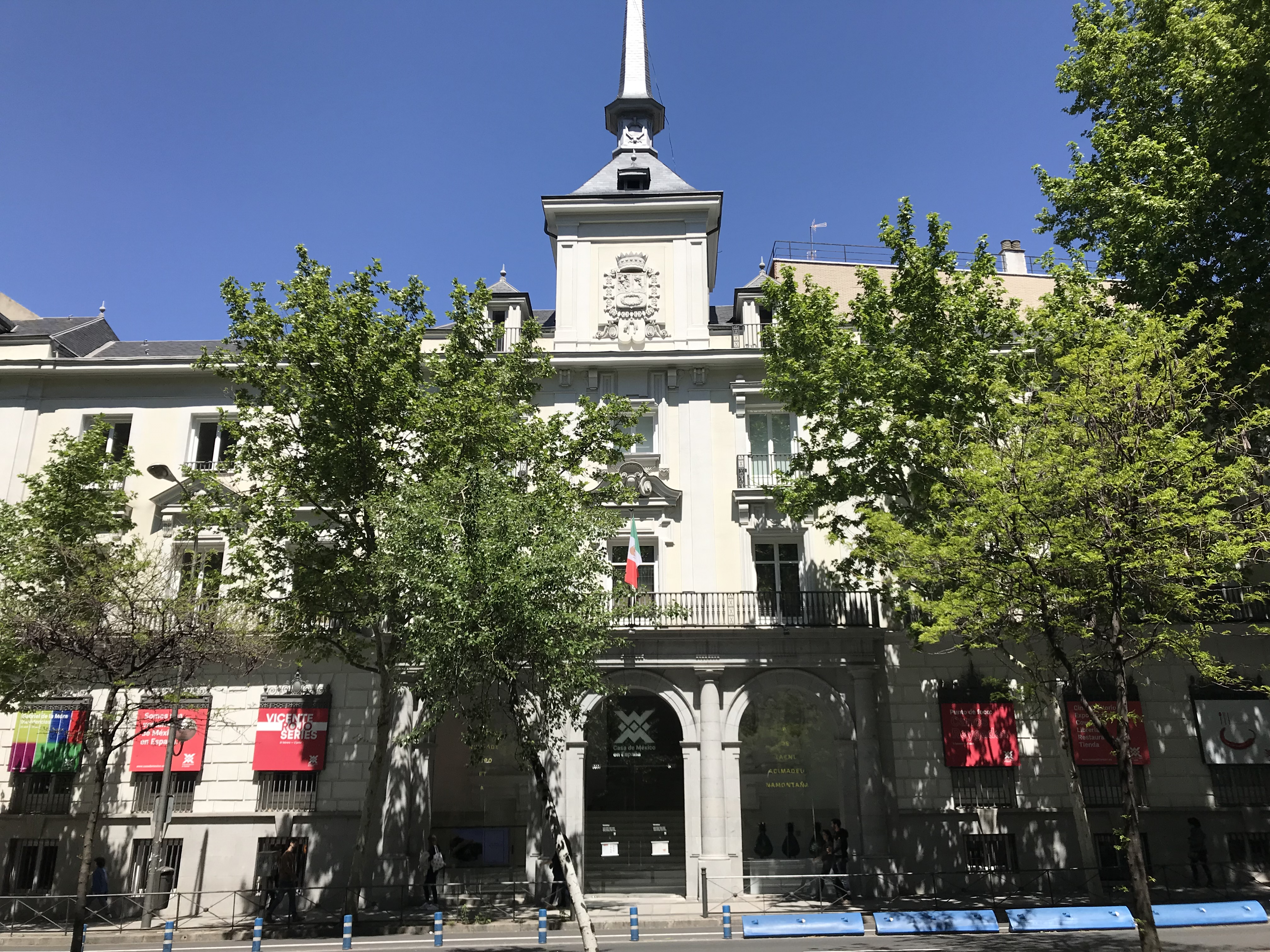
Mexico House in Madrid

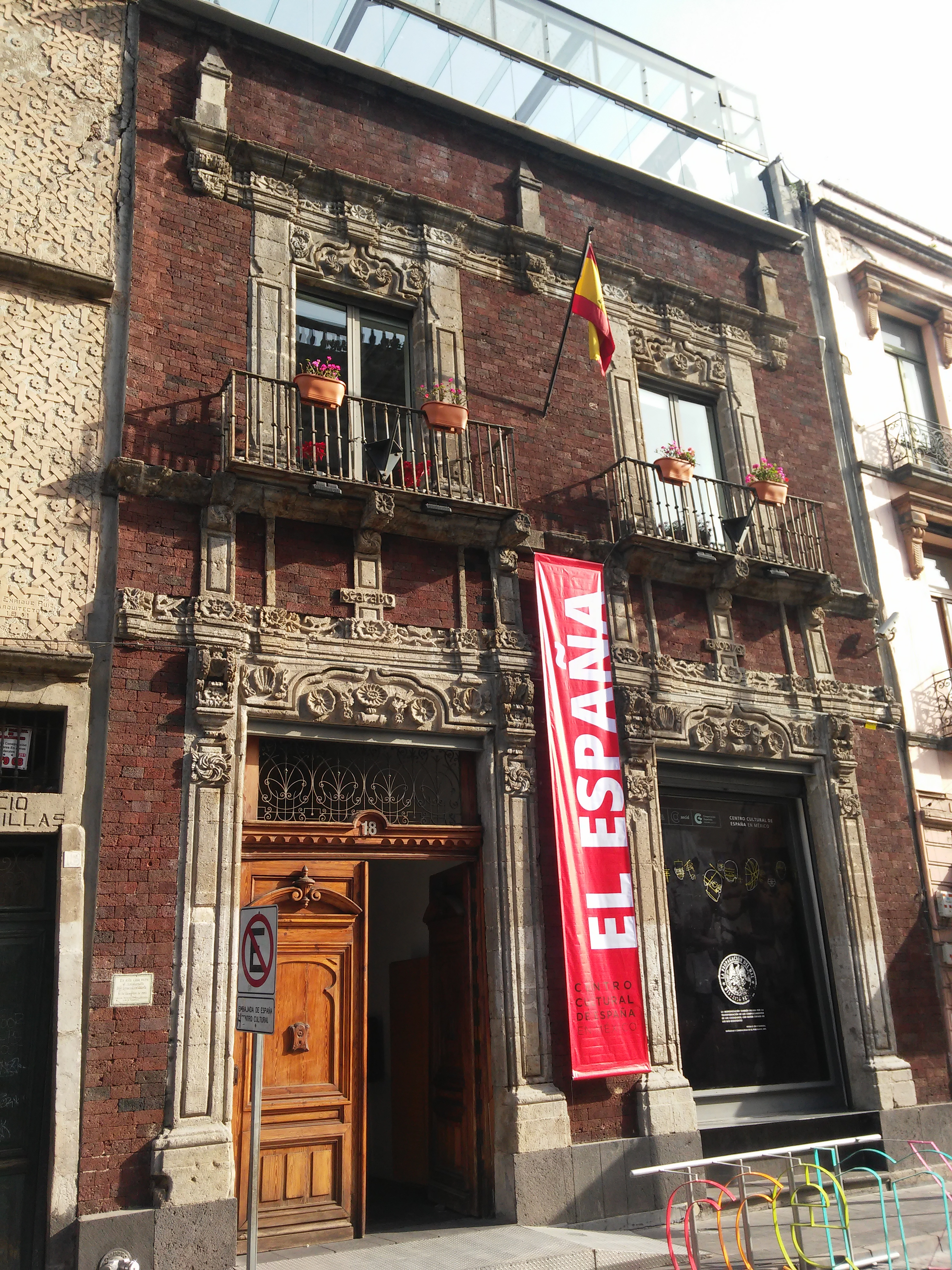
Spanish Cultural Center in Mexico City

== Drug trafficking ==
In 2012, four suspected members of Mexican drug cartel Sinaloa were arrested in Spain, while allegedly trying to set up a European operation.

In 2013, the head of the Spanish Drugs and Organized Crime Unit (known as Udyco) believed that the Mexican drug cartels had set out to “conquer” Spain and not forge an alliance with Colombian drug organizations.

In 2017, Spanish police extradited Juan Manuel Muñoz Luévano, suspected of carrying out operations for Mexican drugs cartel los Zetas in Spain, to the United States.

== Trade relations ==
In 1997, Mexico signed a Free Trade Agreement with the European Union, of which Spain is a member. In 2023, two-way trade between both nations amounted to US$7.4 billion. Mexico's exports to Spain include: crude oil, medicine, alcohol, fish and mobile phones; while Spanish exports to Mexico include: vehicles, vehicle parts and wine. Mexico is Spain's biggest trading partner in Latin America.On June 2,2026 Mexico and Spain agreed to double bilateral trade and increase mutual investment by at least 50% by 2030. Announced in Mexico City by Spanish Economy Minister Carlos Cuerpo and Mexican Economy Secretary Marcelo Ebrard, the agreement marks an expanded economic partnership supported by the modernized Mexico–European Union trade framework.

Several prominent Spanish multinational companies operate in Mexico, such as: Banco Bilbao Vizcaya Argentaria, Mapfre, Repsol, Santander, Telefónica and Zara; while several multinational Mexican companies operate in Spain, such as: ALFA, Cemex, Gruma, Grupo Bimbo and Softtek (among others).

== Resident diplomatic missions ==
of Mexico in Spain

- Madrid (Embassy)
- Barcelona (Consulate)

of Spain in Mexico

- Mexico City (Embassy)
- Mexico City (Consulate-General)
- Guadalajara (Consulate-General)
- Monterrey (Consulate-General)

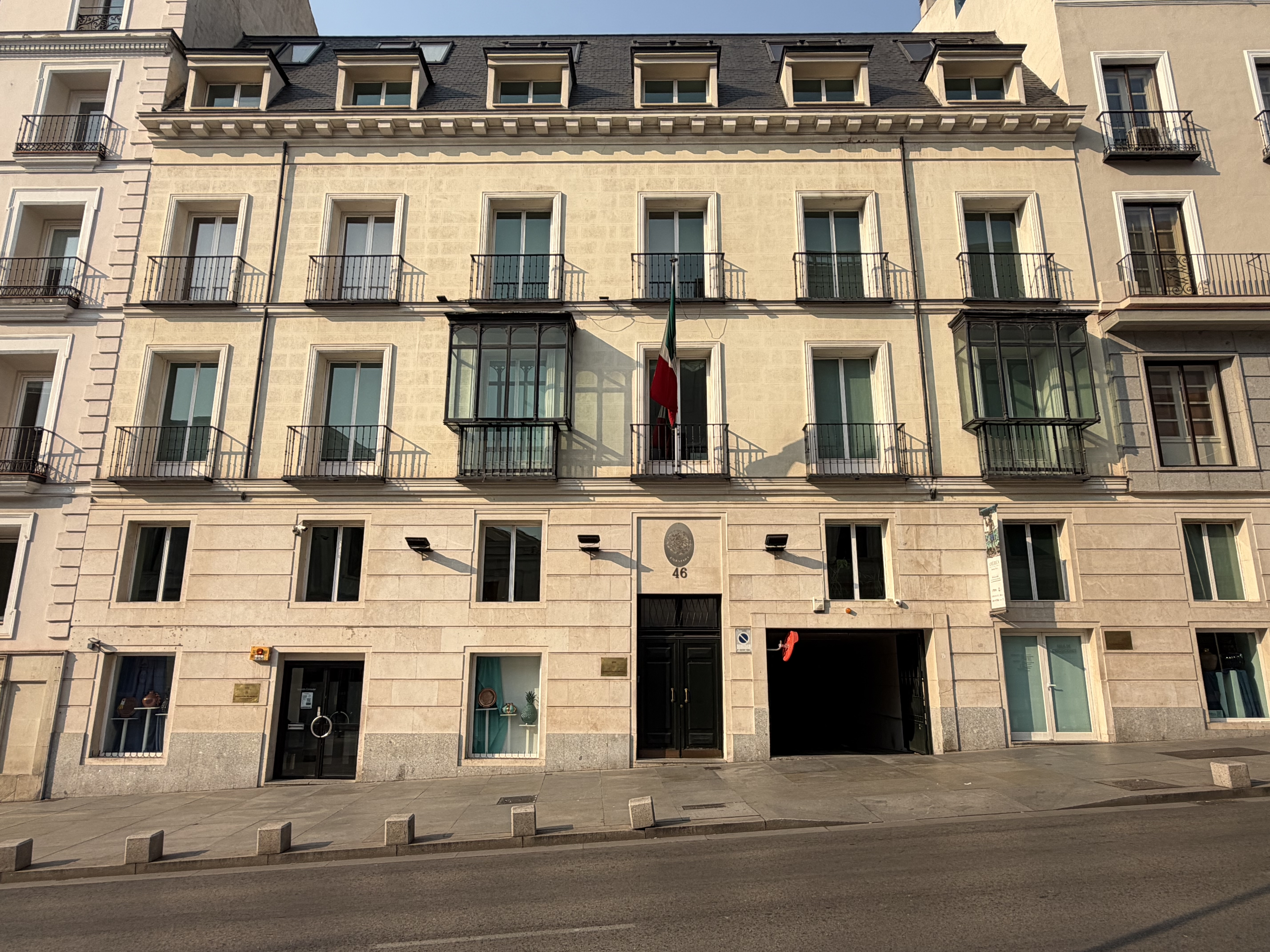
Embassy of Mexico in Madrid

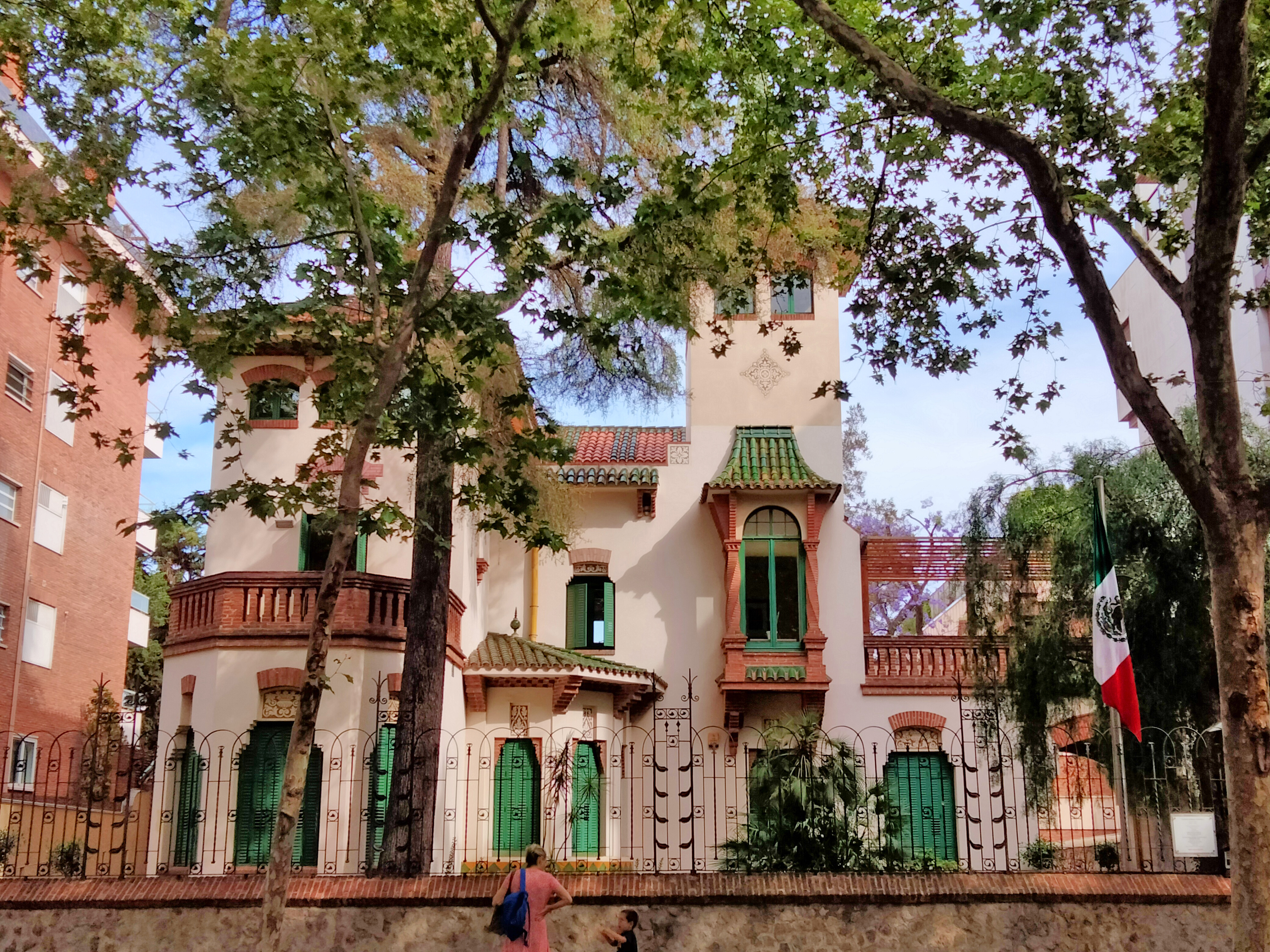
Consulate of Mexico in Barcelona
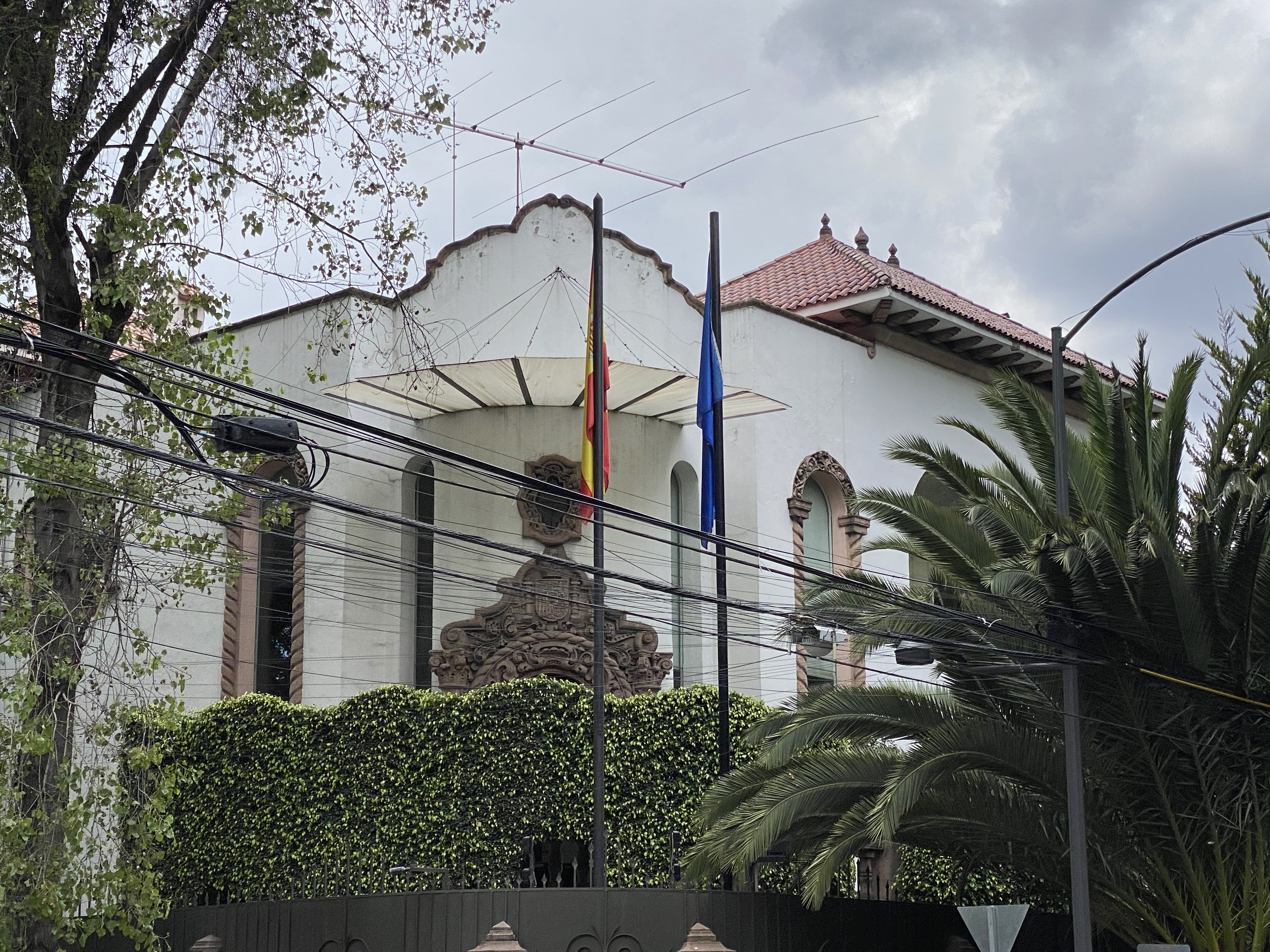
Embassy of Spain in Mexico City

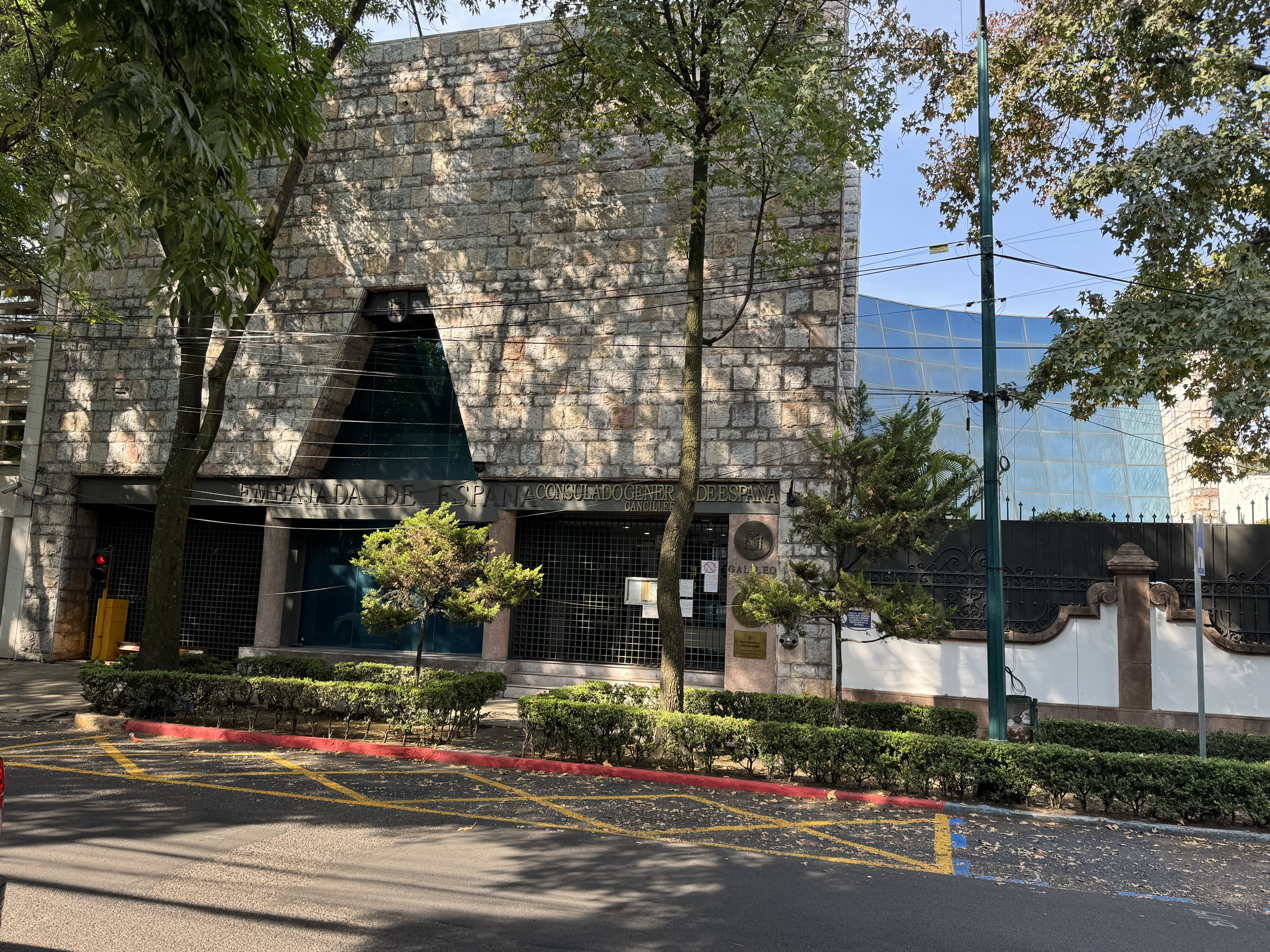
Consulate-General of Spain in Mexico City

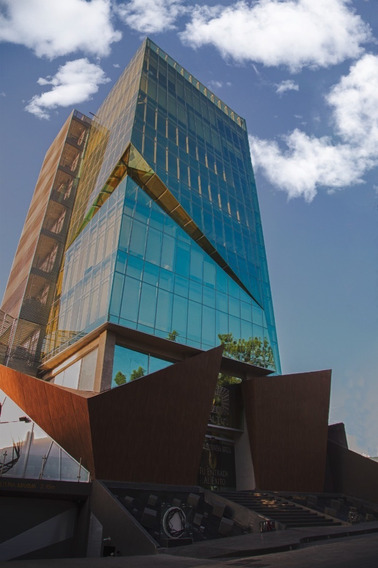
Building hosting the Consulate-General of Spain in Guadalajara

Building hosting the Consulate-General of Spain in Monterrey

== Gallery ==
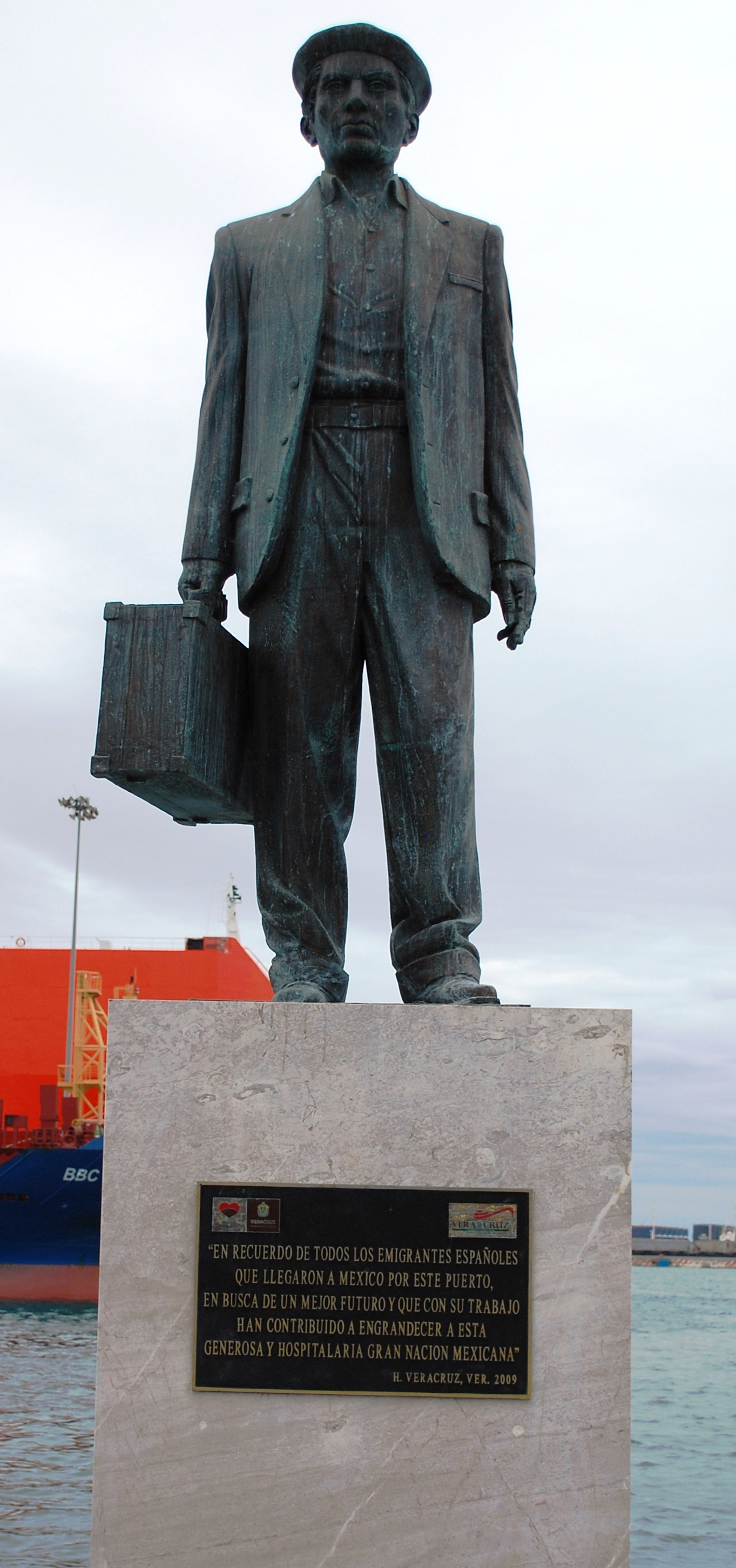
Statue in Veracruz City to Spanish exiles who came to Mexico after the Spanish Civil War

Mexican Pavilion at the 1929 Ibero-American Exposition in Seville

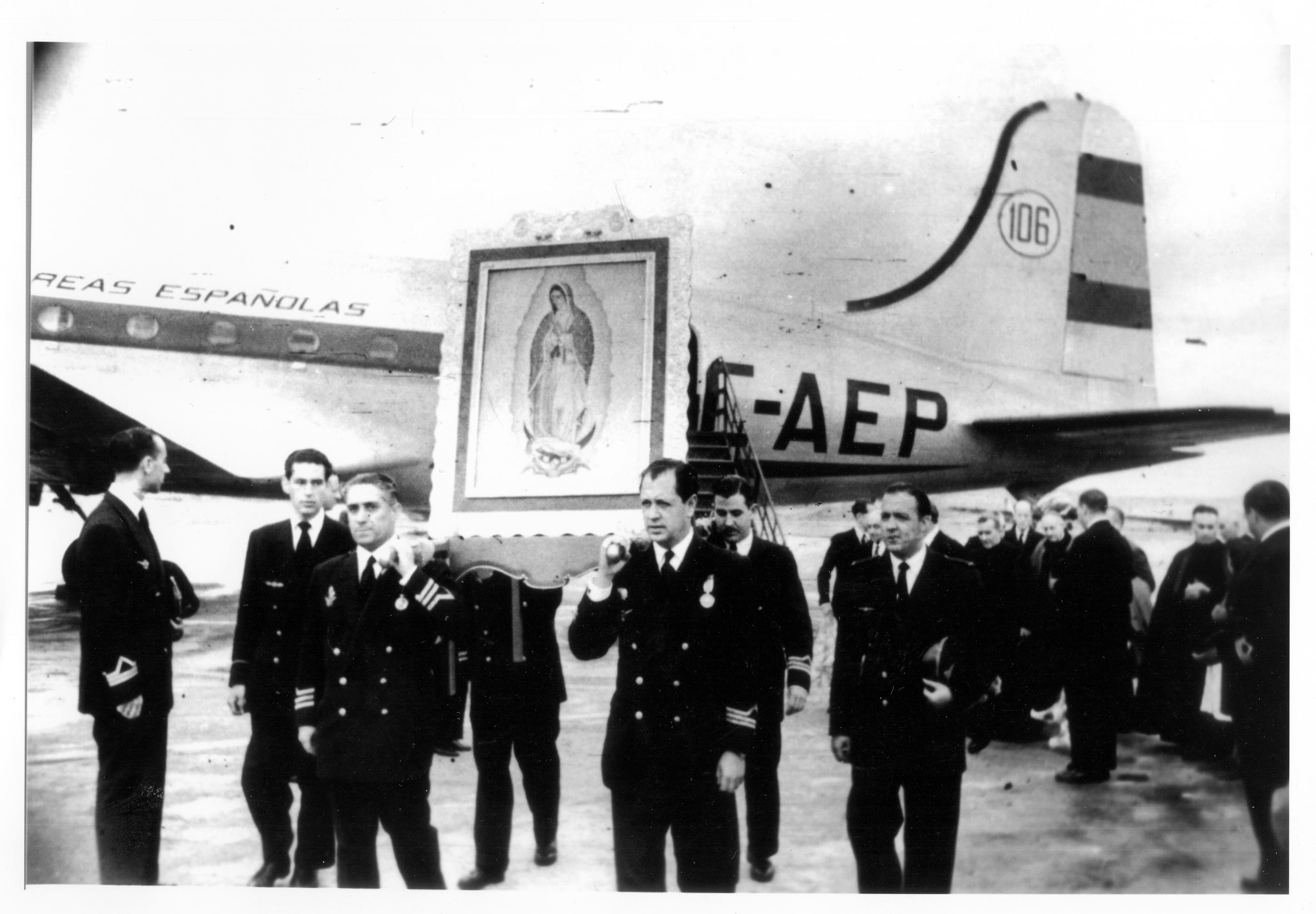
Inaugural flight of Iberia Airlines from Madrid to Mexico City in 1950

The ARM Cuauhtémoc in A Coruña

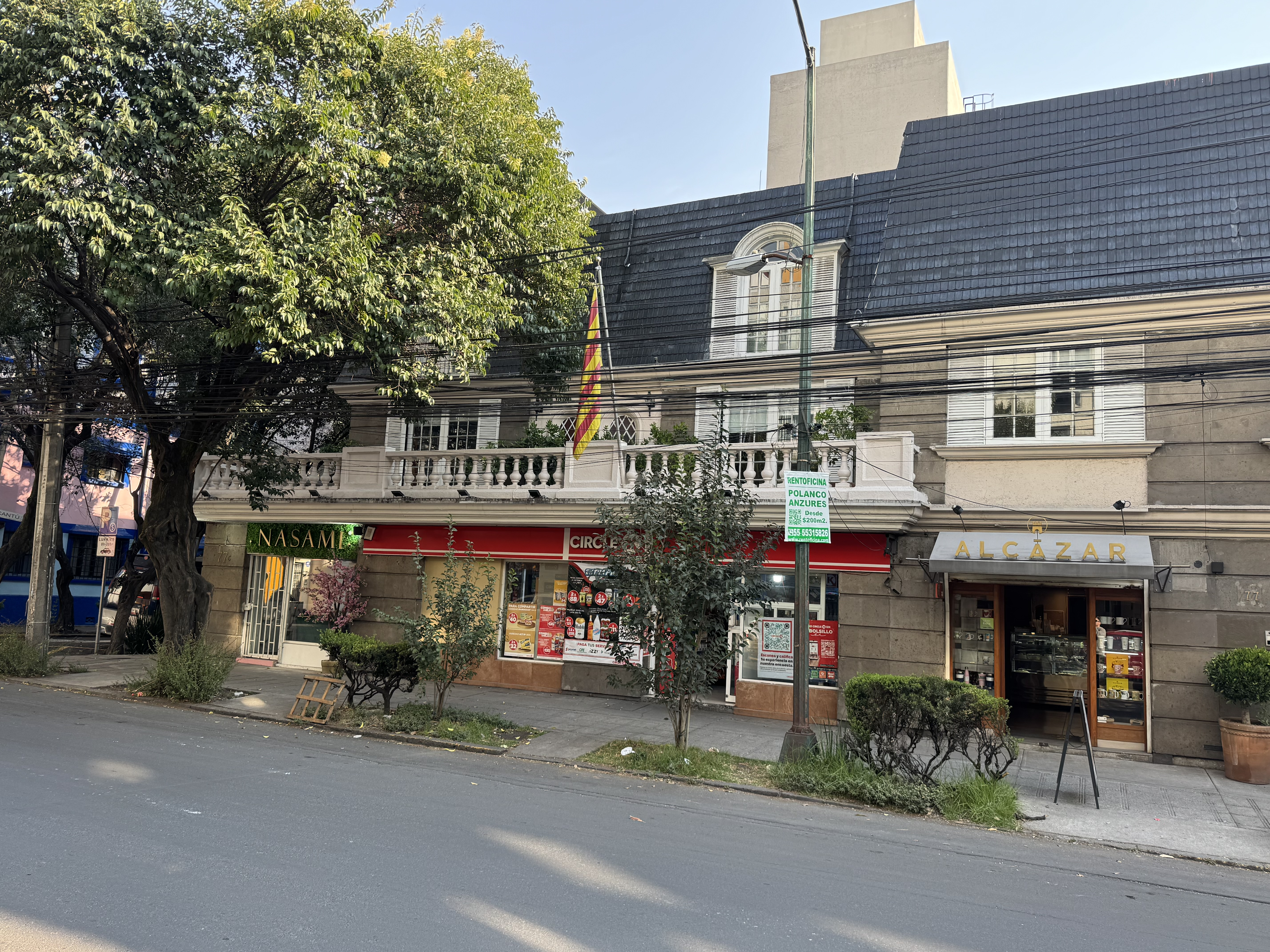
Delegation of the Government of Catalonia in Mexico City

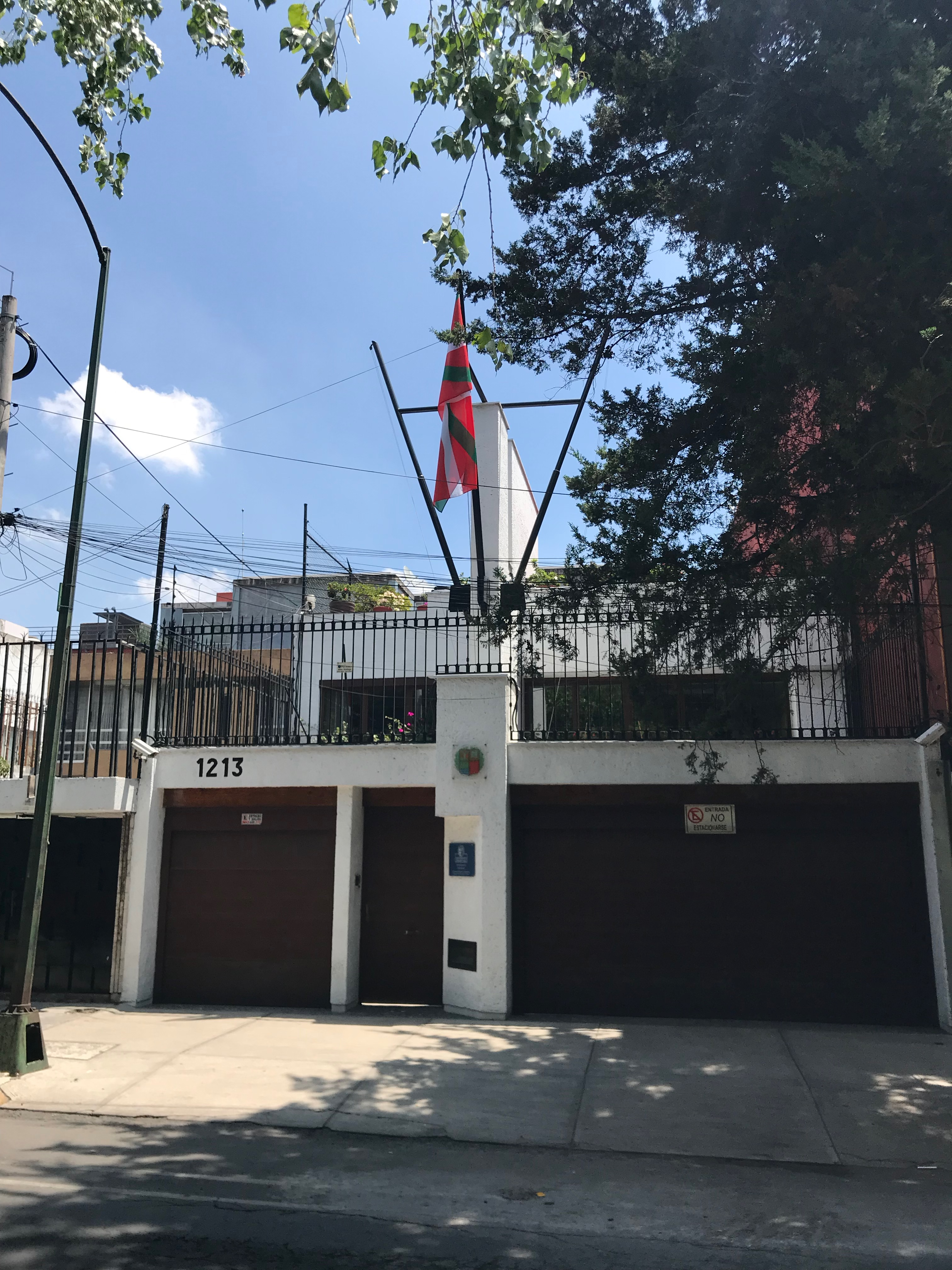
Delegation of the Basque Autonomous Community (Euskadi) in Mexico City

Centro Gallego in Mexico City

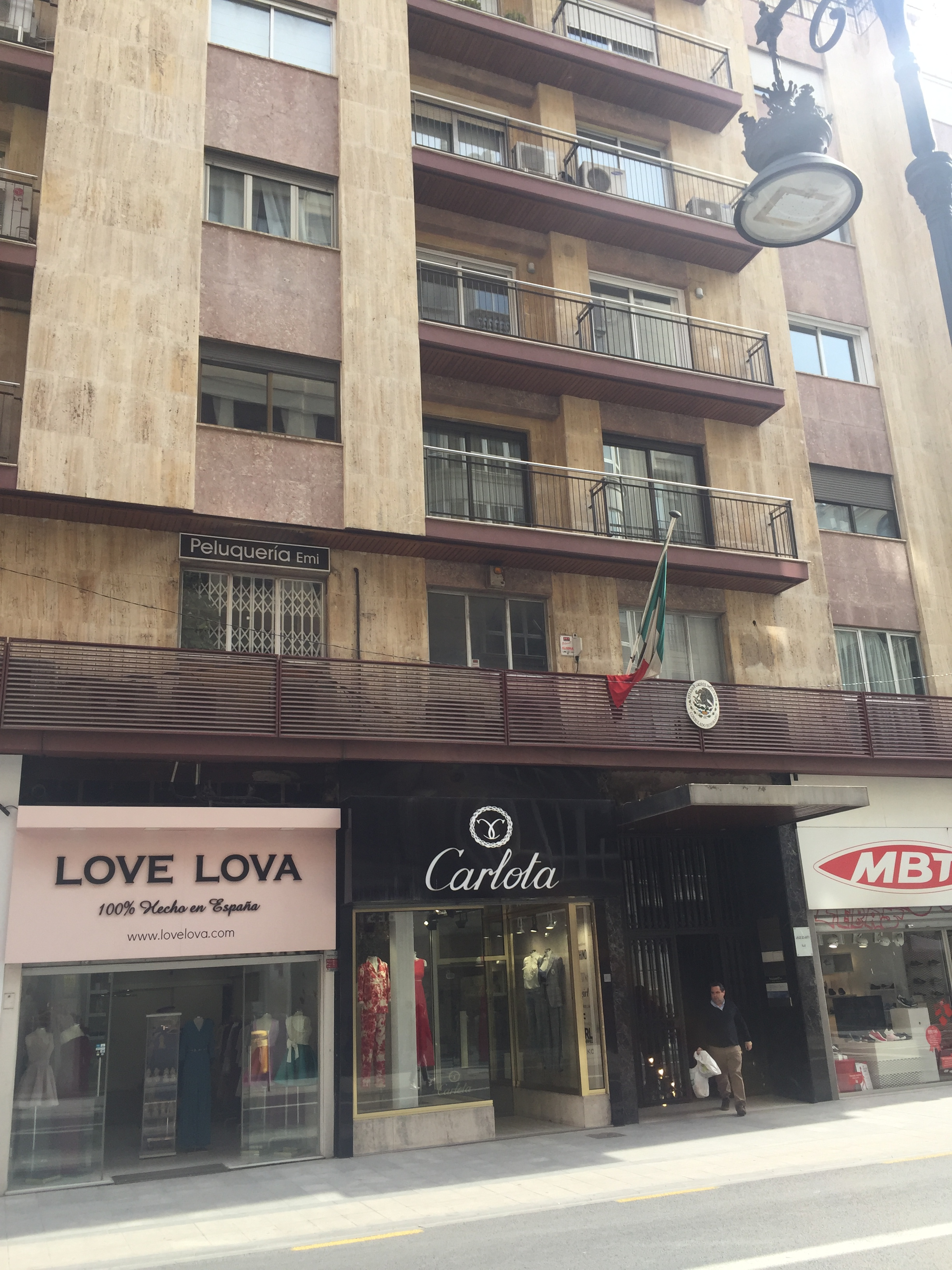
Honorary consulate of Mexico in Valencia

Celebration of Mexico's Independence in Madrid

Flags of Mexico and Spain at the National Palace in Mexico City

== See also ==
- Centro Cultural de España, Mexico City
- Embassy of Mexico, Madrid
- Mexican immigration to Spain
- Spanish immigration to Mexico
