= Embassy of Mexico, Madrid =

Embassy of Mexico in Spain
- Embajada de México en España

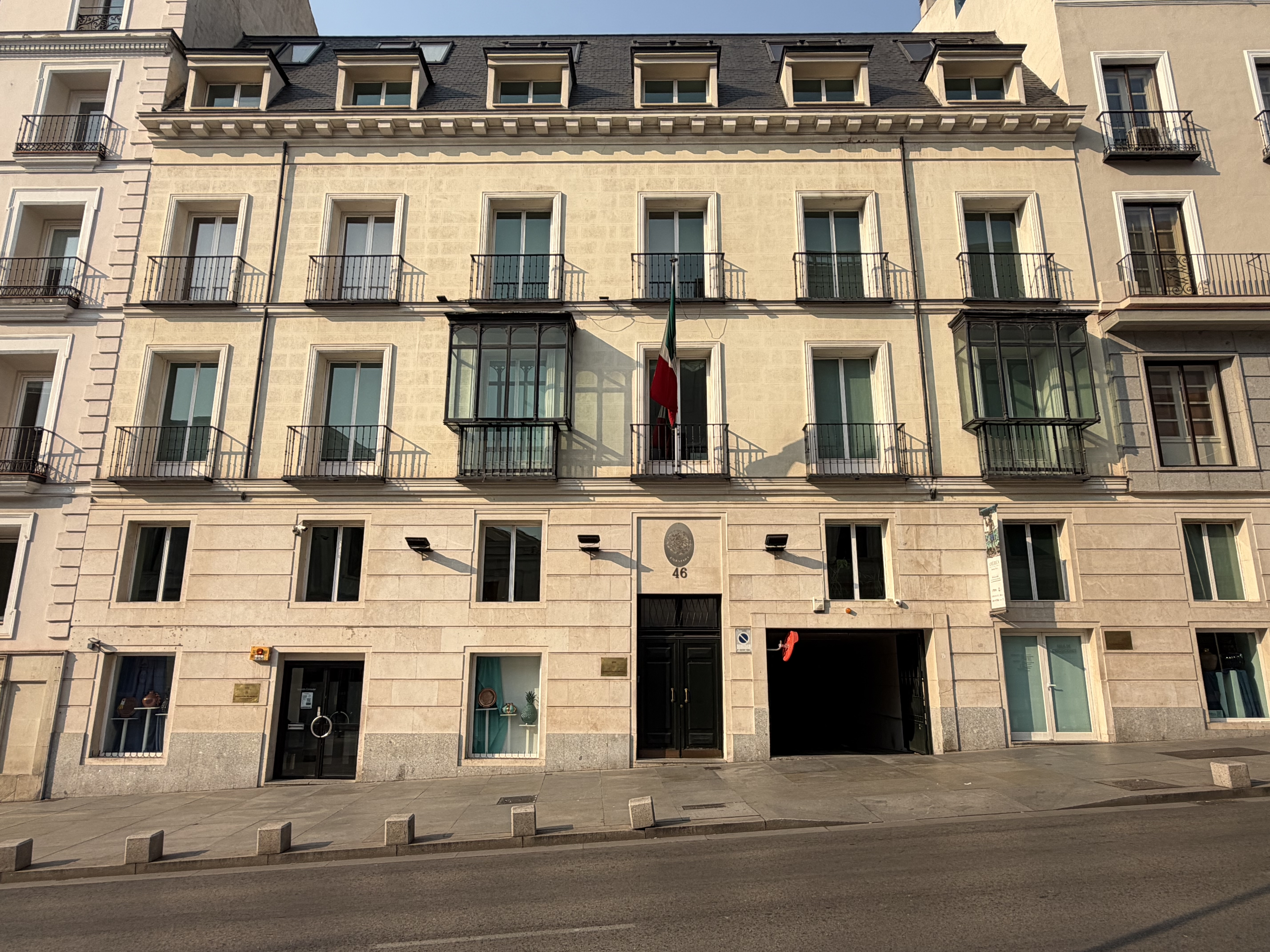
- Incumbent; Quirino Ordaz Coppel since 28 January 2022
- Style: Excellency
- Type: Diplomatic mission
- Status: Active
- Reports to: Secretariat of Foreign Affairs; President of Mexico
- Seat: 46 Carrera de San Jerónimo; Madrid, Spain
- Appointer: President of Mexico with Senate advice and consent
- Term length: No set term length
- Formation: 1835 or 1836
- First holder: Miguel de Santa María
- Website: embamex.sre.gob.mx/espana

The Embassy of Mexico in Spain, located in Madrid, is the primary diplomatic mission of the United Mexican States in the Kingdom of Spain. Diplomatic relations between the two countries were established in 1836, 15 years after the Mexican War of Independence, but were severed in 1940 due to Mexico's support for the Second Spanish Republic in the Spanish Civil War. Relations were re-established in 1977 upon Spain's return to democracy following the death of Francisco Franco.

The head of the mission also represents Mexico at the World Tourism Organization.

== Location ==
The chancery building of the embassy, as well as the Consular Section, is located at 46 Carrera de San Jerónimo in the Cortes Ward of the Centro District.

Mexico also maintains a consulate in Barcelona. It is located at Paseo de la Bonanova, 55.

== Ambassadors ==
The Ambassador of Mexico to the Spain is the highest ranking diplomatic representative of the United Mexican States to the Kingdom of Spain and subsequently holds the rank of "Ambassador Extraordinary and Plenipotentiary." The following is a list of Mexican ambassadors since the presidency of Felipe Calderón:

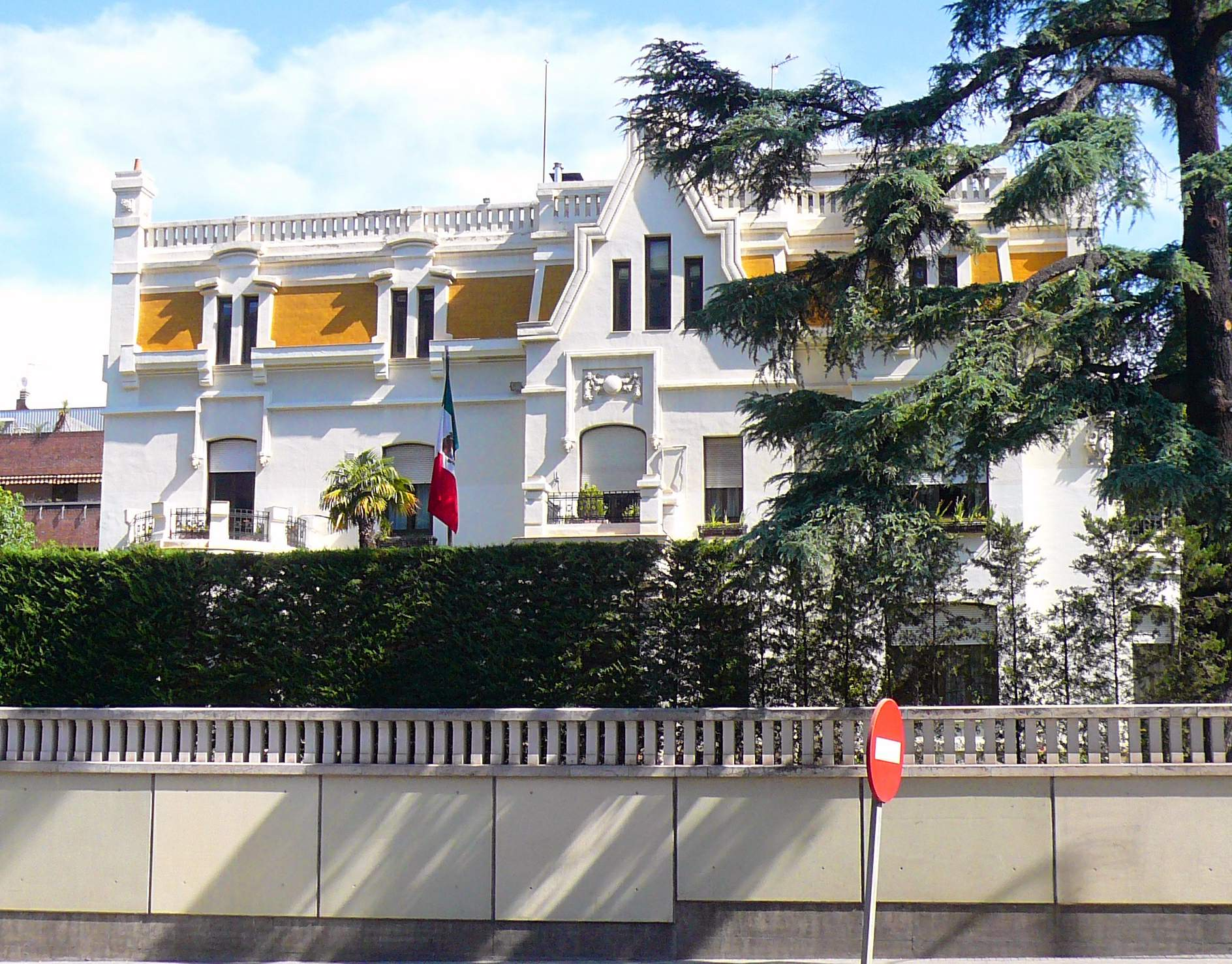
Official residence of the Mexican Ambassador in Spain, located at 13 Calle del Pinar

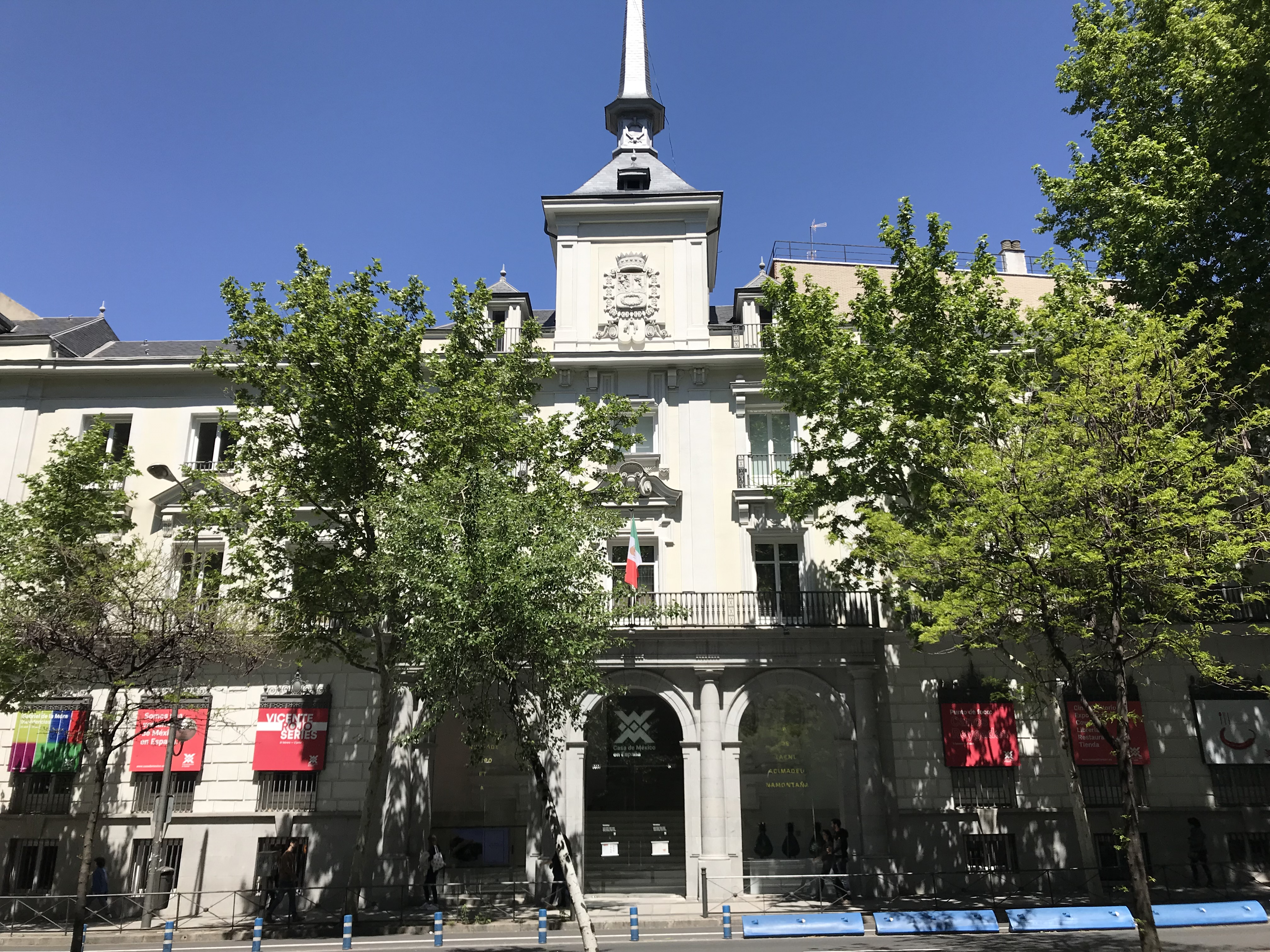
Mexican Cultural Center in Madrid (Casa de México)

- Under President Felipe Calderón Hinojosa (2006 – 2012)
  - 2006 – 2007: Enrique Gabriel Jiménez Remus
  - 2007 – 2011: Jorge Zermeño Infante
- Under President Enrique Peña Nieto (2012 – 2018)
  - 2012 – 2013: Francisco Javier Ramírez Acuña
  - 2013 – 2018: Roberta Lajous Vargas
- Under President Andrés Manuel López Obrador (2018 – Present)
  - 2018 – 2022: Roberta Lajous Vargas
  - 2022 – Present: Quirino Ordaz Coppel

== Embassy sections ==
The embassy exercises a number of functions in its representation to the Government of the Spain, including political, administrative, economic, public diplomacy, and consular affairs, that are managed by officials from the Secretariat of Foreign Affairs. Some of the different sections of the embassy are as follow:

- Office of the Ambassador
- Office of the chief of the chancellery
- Office of the consular section
- Office for cooperation with the Ibero-American Summit
- Office for internal policy and cooperation
- Office for press and media
- Office for foreign policy and multilateral affairs
- Office for community affairs
- Office of the director of the Mexican Cultural Institute

== Honorary consulates ==
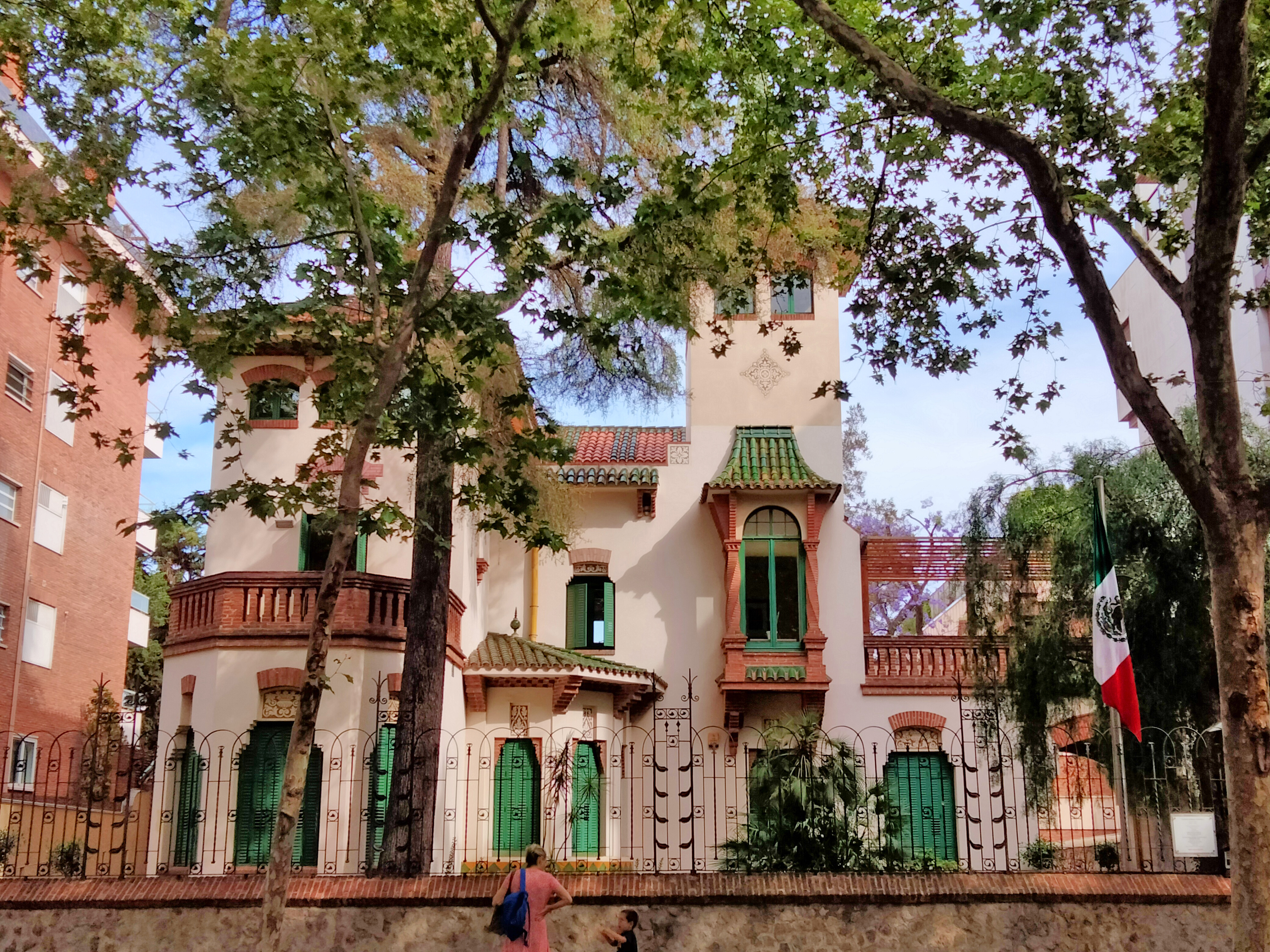
Consulate of Mexico in Barcelona

In addition to the Consular Section in Madrid and the consulate in Barcelona, the embassy also maintains honorary consulates throughout Spain. They are located in the following cities:

- Alicante
  - Attends: Valencian Community
- Málaga
  - Attends: Eastern Andalusia
- Murcia
  - Attends: Murcia and Province of Albacete
- Ourense
  - Attends: Galicia
- Palma de Mallorca
  - Attends: Balearic Islands
- Santa Cruz de Tenerife
  - Attends: Canary Islands
- Seville
  - Attends: Western Andalusia
- Valencia
  - Attends: Valencian Community
- Valladolid
  - Attends: Castile and León
- Zaragoza
  - Attends: Aragon

== See also ==
- Mexico–Spain relations
- Foreign relations of Mexico
- List of diplomatic missions of Mexico
