= List of diplomatic missions in Panama =

This is a list of diplomatic missions in Panama. There are currently 49 embassies in Panama City.

Honorary consulates are excluded from this listing.

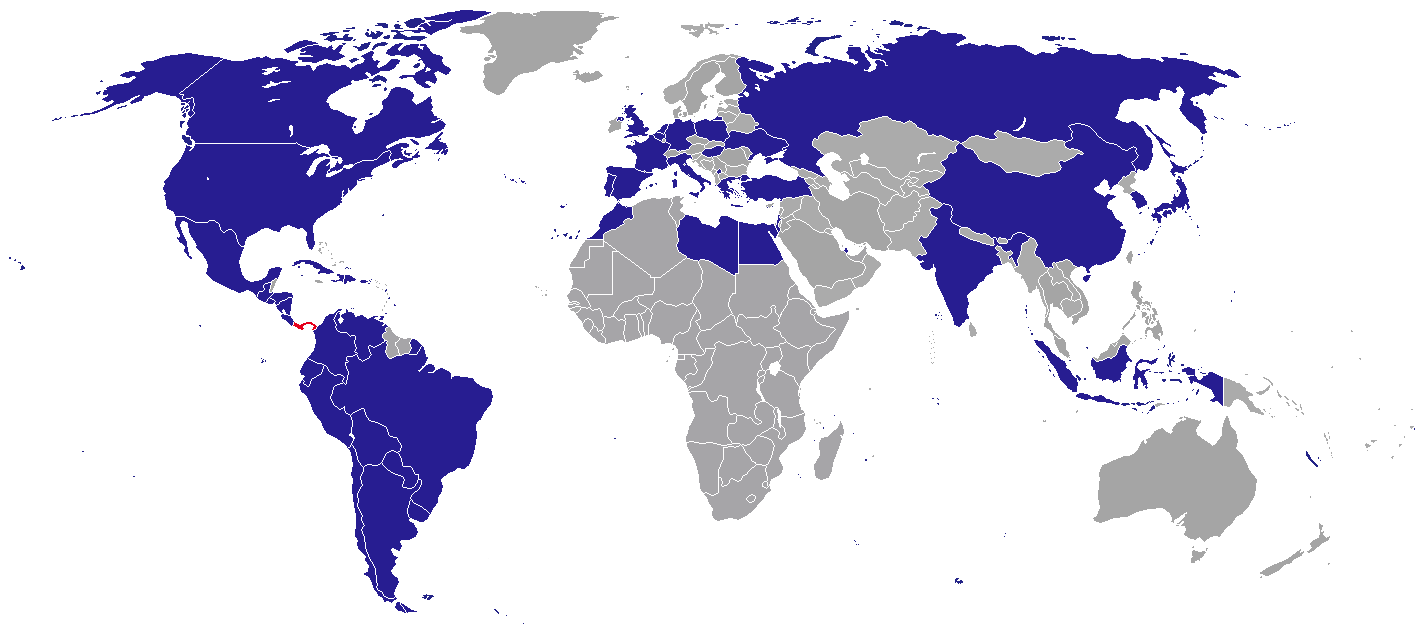
Map of diplomatic missions in Panama

== Diplomatic missions in Panama City ==
=== Embassies ===
1. Argentina
2. Barbados
3. Belgium
4. Bolivia
5. Brazil
6. Canada
7. Chile
8. China
9. Colombia
10. Costa Rica
11. Cuba
12. Dominican Republic
13. Ecuador
14. Egypt
15. El Salvador
16. France
17. Germany
18. Greece
19. Guatemala
20. Haiti
21. Holy See
22. Honduras
23. India
24. Indonesia
25. Israel
26. Italy
27. Japan
28. Kosovo
29. Libya
30. Mexico
31. Morocco
32. Netherlands
33. Nicaragua
34. Paraguay
35. Peru
36. Poland
37. Portugal
38. Qatar
39. Russia
40. South Korea
41. Sovereign Military Order of Malta
42. Spain
43. Trinidad and Tobago
44. Turkey
45. Ukraine
46. United Kingdom
47. United States
48. Uruguay
49. Venezuela

=== Other missions or delegations ===
1. European Union (Delegation)
2. Hungary (Embassy office)
3. Organization of American States (Representative office)
4. United Nations (Resident coordinator's office)

== Gallery of embassies ==
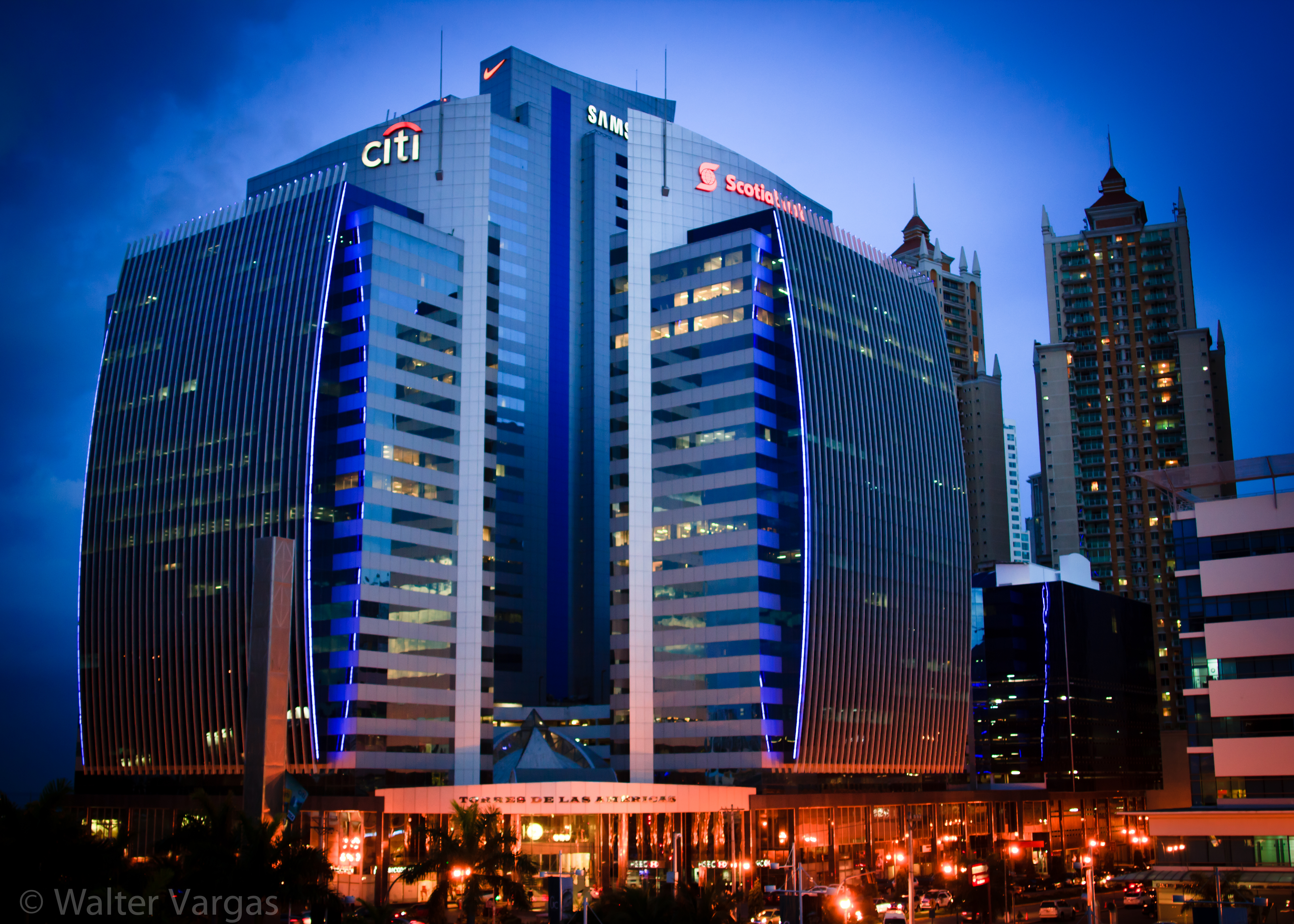
Building hosting the Embassies of Canada, Chile, Kosovo, and Qatar

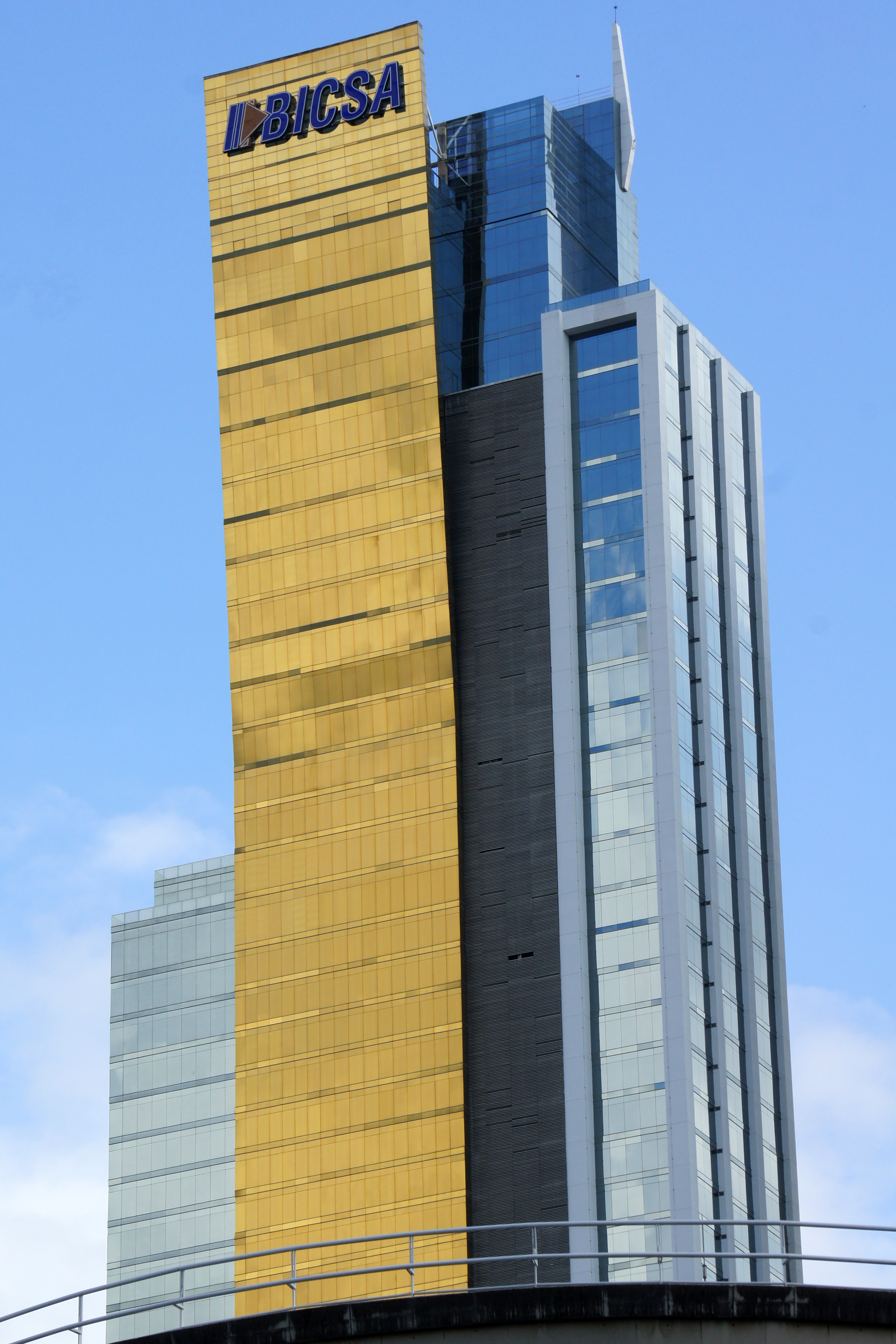
Building hosting the Embassies of Costa Rica, Guatemala, and Ukraine

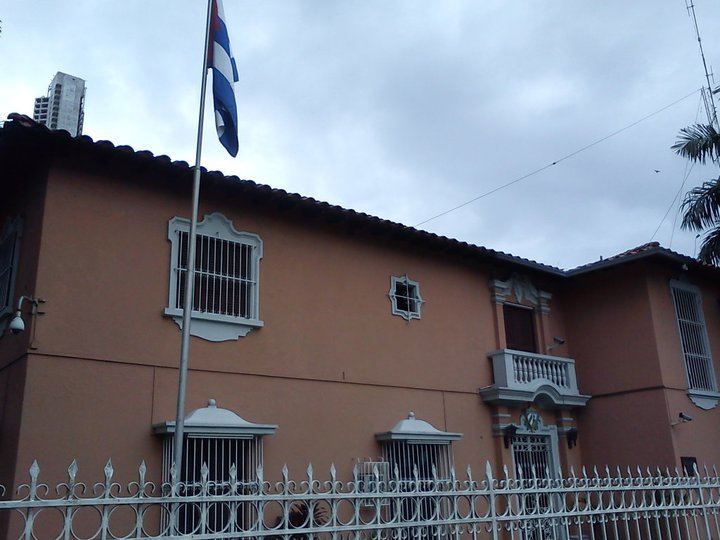
Embassy of Cuba

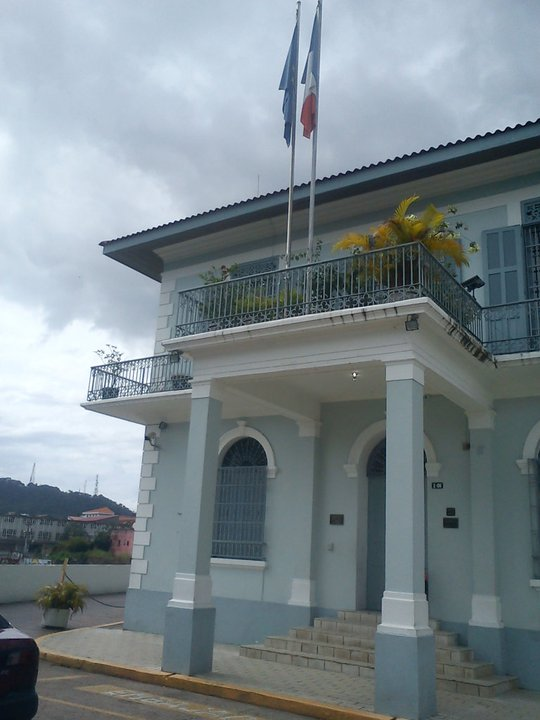
Embassy of France

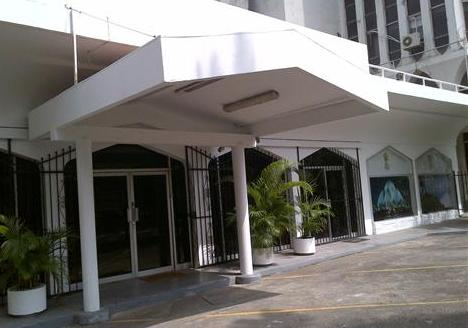
Embassy of India

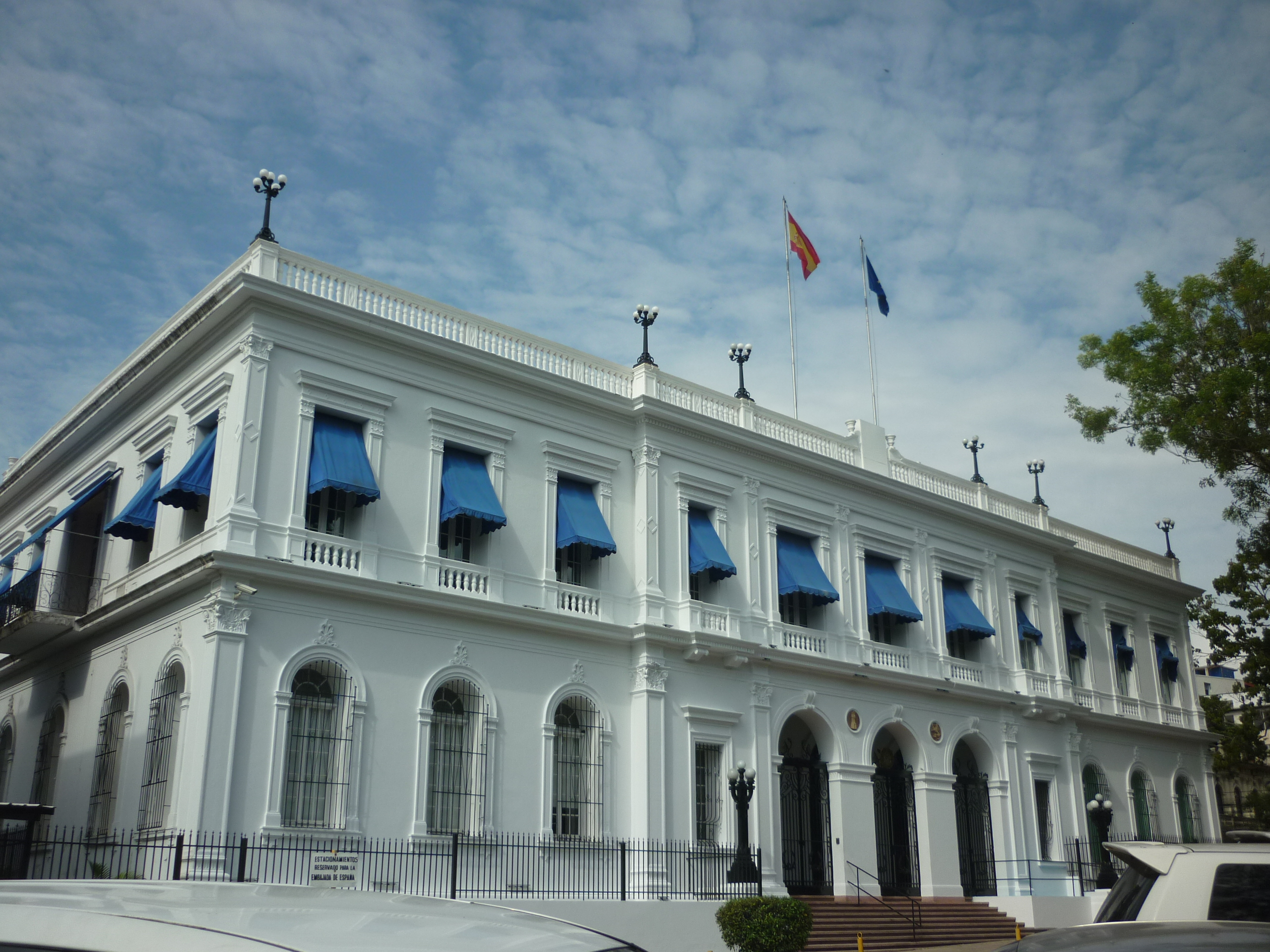
Embassy of Spain

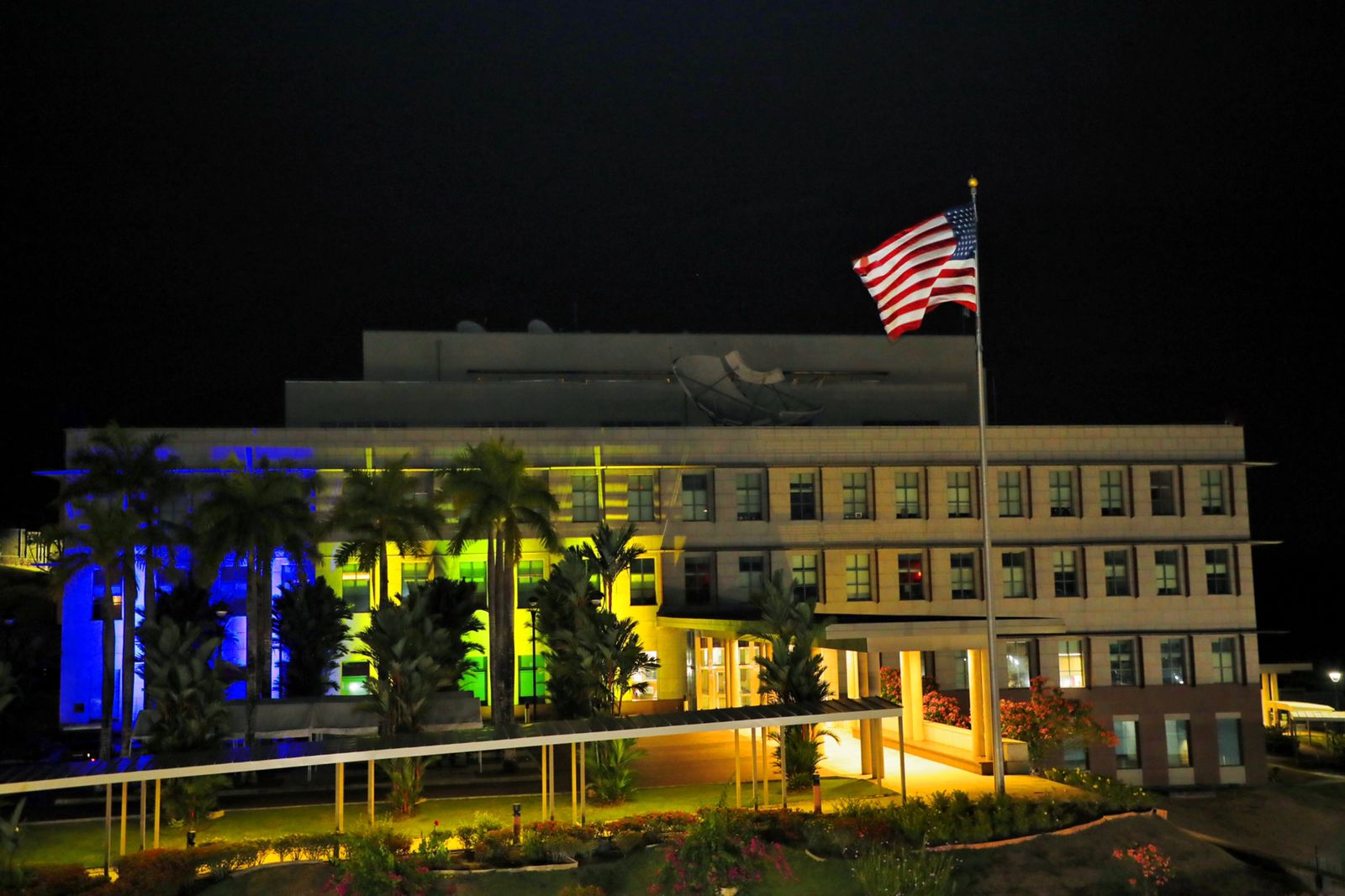
Embassy of the United States

== Consulates ==
=== Colón ===
- Colombia (Consulate)

=== David ===
- Costa Rica (Consulate-General)

=== Jaqué ===
- Colombia (Consulate)

=== Puerto Obaldía ===
- Colombia (Consulate)

== Non-resident embassies accredited to Panama ==
=== Resident in Bogotá, Colombia ===
1. Austria
2. Belarus
3. Czechia
4. Denmark
5. Finland
6. Hungary
7. Ireland
8. Iran
9. Lebanon
10. New Zealand
11. Norway
12. Romania
13. United Arab Emirates

=== Resident in Havana, Cuba ===
1. Angola
2. Benin
3. Burkina Faso
4. Cambodia
5. Congo-Brazzaville
6. Djibouti
7. Ghana
8. Guinea
9. Guinea-Bissau
10. Namibia
11. Sri Lanka

=== Resident in Mexico City, Mexico ===
1. Algeria
2. Armenia
3. Australia
4. Azerbaijan
5. Bulgaria
6. Georgia
7. Jamaica
8. Jordan
9. Kazakhstan
10. Nigeria
11. Pakistan
12. Philippines
13. Slovakia
14. South Africa
15. Serbia
16. Vietnam

=== Resident in Washington, D.C., United States ===
1. Afghanistan
2. Albania
3. Croatia
4. Myanmar
5. Nepal
6. Senegal
7. Slovenia
8. Suriname
9. Togo
10. Zambia
11. Zimbabwe

=== Resident elsewhere ===
1. Andorra (New York City) (Note: The accredited mission is the sending country's permanent mission to the United Nations.)
2. Bahamas (Nassau)
3. Bangladesh (New York City)
4. Belize (Guatemala City)
5. Equatorial Guinea (Caracas)
6. Grenada (Caracas)
7. Guyana
8. Iceland (Ottawa)
9. Kenya (Kingston)
10. Kuwait (Caracas)
11. Malta (Valletta) (Note: The ambassador is based in the headquarters of the Maltese foreign ministry, in Valletta.)
12. Malawi (Brasília)
13. Malaysia (Lima)
14. San Marino (Rome)
15. Saudi Arabia (Lima)
16. Singapore (Singapore)
17. Sweden (Guatemala City)
18. Switzerland (San José)
19. Thailand (Santiago de Chile)

=== Unconfirmed ===
1. Central African Republic (Washington, D.C.)
2. Comoros (New York City)
3. Congo-Kinshasa (Havana)
4. Ethiopia (Washington, D.C.)
5. Ivory Coast (Mexico City)
6. Kyrgyzstan (New York City)
7. Maldives (New York City)
8. Mauritius (Washington, D.C.)
9. Sierra Leone (Washington, D.C.)
10. Sudan (Washington, D.C.)
11. Tajikistan (New York City)
12. Turkmenistan (Washington, D.C.)
13. Uganda (New York City)
14. Uzbekistan (Mexico City)
15. Vanuatu (New York City)

== Closed Missions ==
Host city	Sending country	Mission	Year closed	Ref.
Panama City	Sahrawi Republic	Embassy	2024	
Panama City	Taiwan	Embassy	2017	
Panama City	United Arab Emirates	Embassy	Unknown (Note: Most likely closed somewhere between 2017 - the year of its establishment - and 2026.)	
Panama City	Switzerland	Embassy	1995	
Panama City	Vietnam	Embassy (Note: To be reopened)	2018	
Colón	Taiwan	Consulate-General	2009	

== See also ==
- Foreign relations of Panama
- List of diplomatic missions of Panama
- Visa requirements for Panamanian citizens
