= List of diplomatic missions of Panama =

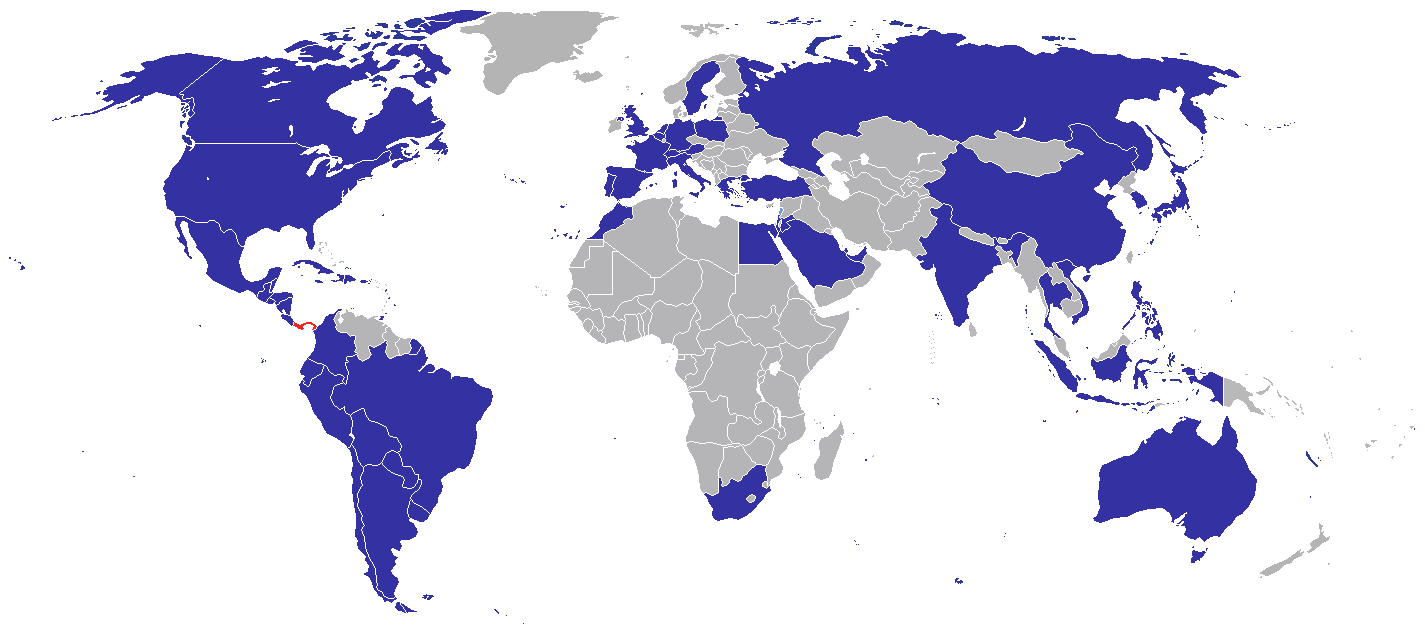
Countries with Panamanian diplomatic missions

The Republic of Panama's status as major flag state for maritime vessels and owner of the Panama Canal has led to the opening missions in cities with significant harbour traffic, such as Antwerp, Rotterdam, Hamburg, Mumbai, Kobe, and Santos.

Of note, Panama was also one of the more significant countries to maintain diplomatic relations with the Republic of China, also known as Taiwan, until 2017, when the government of then-President Juan Carlos Varela recognized the People's Republic of China and began diplomatic relations with it. This led to the closure of its embassy in Taipei, and the opening of missions in Beijing, Guangzhou, Hong Kong, and Shanghai.

This listing excludes honorary consulates, trade missions, and the overseas offices of the Panama Maritime Authority.

== Current missions ==
=== Africa ===
Host country	Host city	Mission	Concurrent accreditation	Ref.
Egypt	Cairo	Embassy	Countries: Libya; South Sudan; International Organizations: African Union (Note: Accredited as an observer mission)	
Morocco	Rabat	Embassy	Countries: Ghana; Mauritania	
South Africa	Pretoria	Embassy	Countries: Botswana; Namibia; Zimbabwe	

=== Americas ===
Host country	Host city	Mission	Concurrent accreditation	Ref.
Argentina	Buenos Aires	Embassy		
Barbados	Bridgetown	Embassy	Countries: Saint Kitts and Nevis; Saint Vincent and the Grenadines	
Belize	Belize City	Embassy		
Bolivia	La Paz	Embassy		
Brazil	Brasília	Embassy		
Brazil	Rio de Janeiro	Consulate General		
Brazil	Santos	Consulate-General		
Canada	Ottawa	Embassy		
Canada	Montreal	Consulate-General		
Canada	Toronto	Consulate-General		
Canada	Vancouver	Consulate-General		
Chile	Santiago de Chile	Embassy		
Chile	Valparaíso	Consulate-General		
Colombia	Bogotá	Embassy		
Colombia	Barranquilla	Consulate-General		
Costa Rica	San José	Embassy		
Cuba	Havana	Embassy	Countries: Burkina Faso; Guinea	
Dominican Republic	Santo Domingo	Embassy		
Ecuador	Quito	Embassy		
Ecuador	Guayaquil	Consulate-General		
El Salvador	San Salvador	Embassy		
Guatemala	Guatemala City	Embassy		
Guyana	Georgetown	Embassy		
Haiti	Port-au-Prince	Embassy		
Honduras	Tegucigalpa	Embassy		
Jamaica	Kingston	Embassy		
Mexico	Mexico City	Embassy		
Mexico	Veracruz City	Consulate-General		
Nicaragua	Managua	Embassy		
Paraguay	Asunción	Embassy		
Peru	Lima	Embassy		
Trinidad and Tobago	Port of Spain	Embassy	Countries: Suriname	
United States	Washington, D.C.	Embassy		
United States	Houston	Consulate-General		
United States	Los Angeles	Consulate-General		
United States	Miami	Consulate-General		
United States	New Orleans	Consulate-General		
United States	New York City	Consulate-General		
United States	Philadelphia	Consulate-General		
United States	Tampa	Consulate-General		
Uruguay	Montevideo	Embassy		
Venezuela	Caracas	Consulate		

=== Asia ===
Host country	Host city	Mission	Concurrent accreditation	Ref.
China	Beijing	Embassy		
China	Guangzhou	Consulate-General		
China	Hong Kong	Consulate-General		
China	Shanghai	Consulate-General		
India	New Delhi	Embassy	Countries: Bangladesh; Nepal	
India	Mumbai	Consulate-General	Countries: Bangladesh; Nepal	
Indonesia	Jakarta	Embassy	International Organizations: Association of Southeast Asian Nations	
Israel	Tel Aviv	Embassy		
Japan	Tokyo	Embassy		
Japan	Kobe	Consulate-General		
Jordan	Amman	Embassy	Countries: Iraq; Lebanon; Palestine	
Lebanon	Beirut	Consulate-General (Note: Subordinate to the embassy in Amman.)		
Philippines	Manila	Embassy		
Qatar	Doha	Embassy	Countries: Bahrain; Kuwait; Oman	
Saudi Arabia	Riyadh	Embassy		
Singapore	Singapore	Embassy	Countries: Brunei; Seychelles	
South Korea	Seoul	Embassy		
Thailand	Bangkok	Embassy	Countries: Cambodia; Laos	
Turkey	Ankara	Embassy	Countries: Azerbaijan; Bulgaria; Georgia	
Turkey	Istanbul	Consulate-General	Countries: Azerbaijan; Bulgaria; Georgia	
United Arab Emirates	Abu Dhabi	Embassy	Countries: Pakistan	
United Arab Emirates	Dubai	Consulate-General	Countries: Pakistan	
Vietnam	Hanoi	Embassy	Countries: Malaysia; Myanmar; Sri Lanka	
Vietnam	Ho Chi Minh City	Consulate-General	Countries: Malaysia; Myanmar; Sri Lanka	

=== Europe ===
Host country	Host city	Mission	Concurrent accreditation	Ref.
Austria	Vienna	Embassy	Countries: Croatia; Romania; Slovakia; International Organizations: United Nations; International Atomic Energy Agency; UNIDO; UNODC	
Belgium	Brussels	Embassy	Countries: Luxembourg; International Organizations: European Union	
Belgium	Antwerp	Consulate-General	Countries: Luxembourg; International Organizations: European Union	
France	Paris	Embassy	Countries: Liechtenstein; Monaco; Tunisia	
France	Marseille	Consulate-General	Countries: Liechtenstein; Monaco; Tunisia	
Germany	Berlin	Embassy	Countries: Czechia; Hungary; Latvia; Lithuania; Slovenia	
Germany	Hamburg	Consulate-General	Countries: Czechia; Hungary; Latvia; Lithuania; Slovenia	
Greece	Athens	Embassy	Countries: Cyprus; Serbia	
Holy See (Note: The Panamanian Embassy to the Holy See is located outside Vatican territory in Rome.)	Rome	Embassy	Sovereign entity: Sovereign Military Order of Malta	
Italy	Rome	Embassy	Countries: Albania; Malta; Montenegro; North Macedonia; San Marino	
Italy	Genoa	Consulate-General	Countries: Albania; Malta; Montenegro; North Macedonia; San Marino	
Italy	Naples	Consulate-General	Countries: Albania; Malta; Montenegro; North Macedonia; San Marino	
Italy	Venice	Consulate-General	Countries: Albania; Malta; Montenegro; North Macedonia; San Marino	
Netherlands	The Hague	Embassy	International Organizations: Organisation for the Prohibition of Chemical Weapons	
Netherlands	Rotterdam	Consulate-General	International Organizations: Organisation for the Prohibition of Chemical Weapons	
Poland	Warsaw	Embassy	Countries: Moldova; Ukraine	
Portugal	Lisbon	Embassy	Countries: Cape Verde; Guinea-Bissau	
Russia	Moscow	Embassy	Countries: Armenia; Belarus; Kazakhstan; Turkmenistan	
Spain	Madrid	Embassy	Countries: Andorra	
Spain	A Coruña	Consulate-General	Countries: Andorra	
Spain	Barcelona	Consulate-General	Countries: Andorra	
Spain	Las Palmas de Gran Canaria	Consulate-General	Countries: Andorra	
Spain	Valencia	Consulate-General	Countries: Andorra	
Sweden	Stockholm	Embassy	Countries: Denmark; Estonia; Finland; Norway	
Switzerland	Bern	Embassy	Countries: Bosnia and Herzegovina	
United Kingdom	London	Embassy	Countries: Iceland; Ireland	

=== Oceania ===
Host country	Host city	Mission	Concurrent accreditation	Ref.
Australia	Canberra	Embassy	Countries: Maldives; New Zealand	

=== Multilateral organisations ===
Organization	Host city	Host country	Mission	Concurrent accreditation	Ref.
Food and Agriculture Organization	Rome	Italy	Permanent Mission	International Organizations: International Fund for Agricultural Development; World Food Programme	
International Maritime Organization	London	United Kingdom	Permanent Mission		
Organization of American States	Washington, D.C.	United States	Permanent Mission	Countries: Antigua and Barbuda; Bahamas; Dominica; Grenada; Saint Lucia	
United Nations	New York City	United States	Permanent Mission	Countries: Afghanistan; Fiji; Palau; Solomon Islands	
United Nations	Geneva	Switzerland	Permanent Mission		
UNESCO	Paris	France	Permanent Mission		
World Trade Organization	Geneva	Switzerland	Permanent Mission		

== Gallery ==
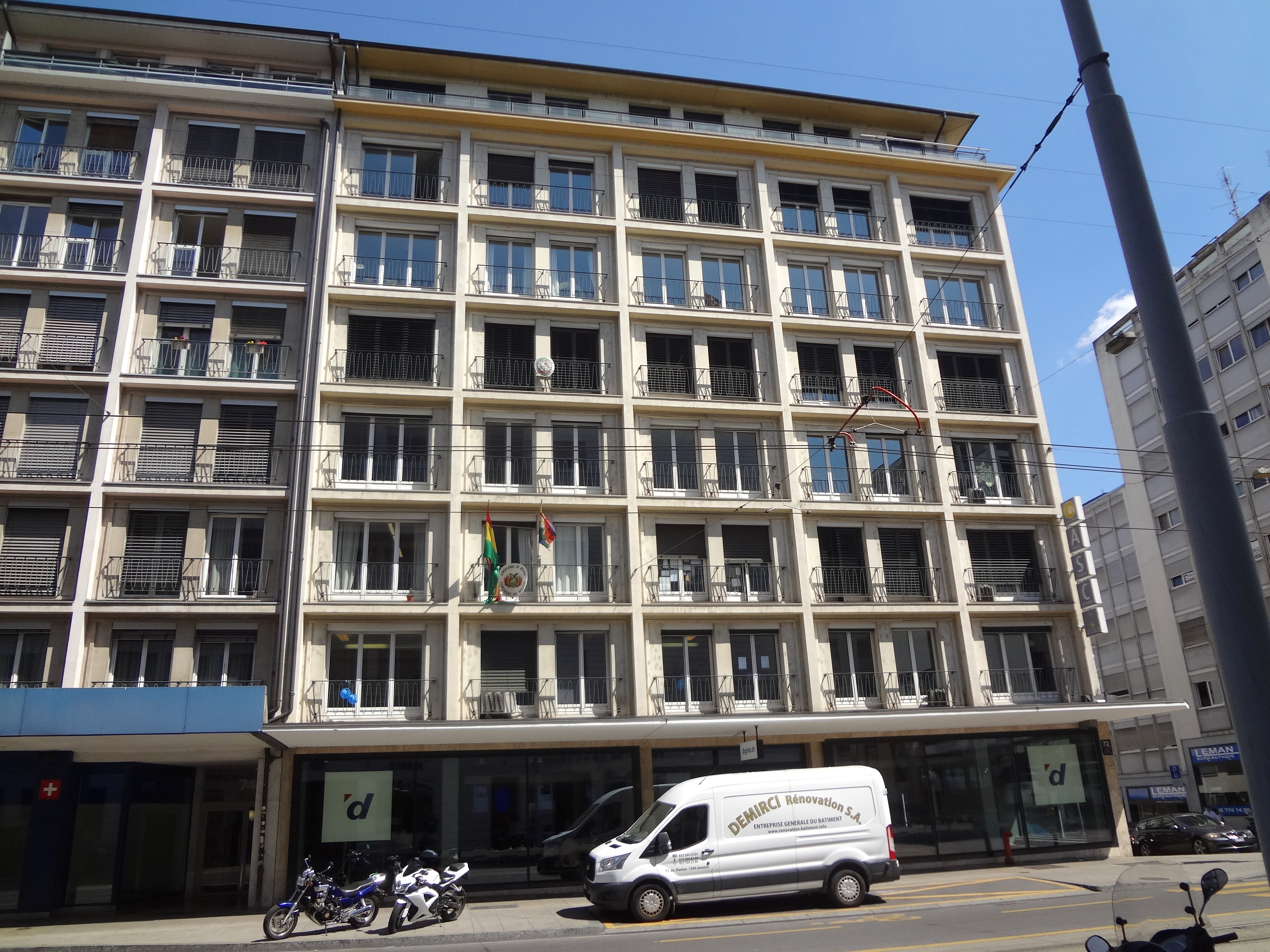
Building hosting the Permanent Mission to the United Nations Office in Geneva

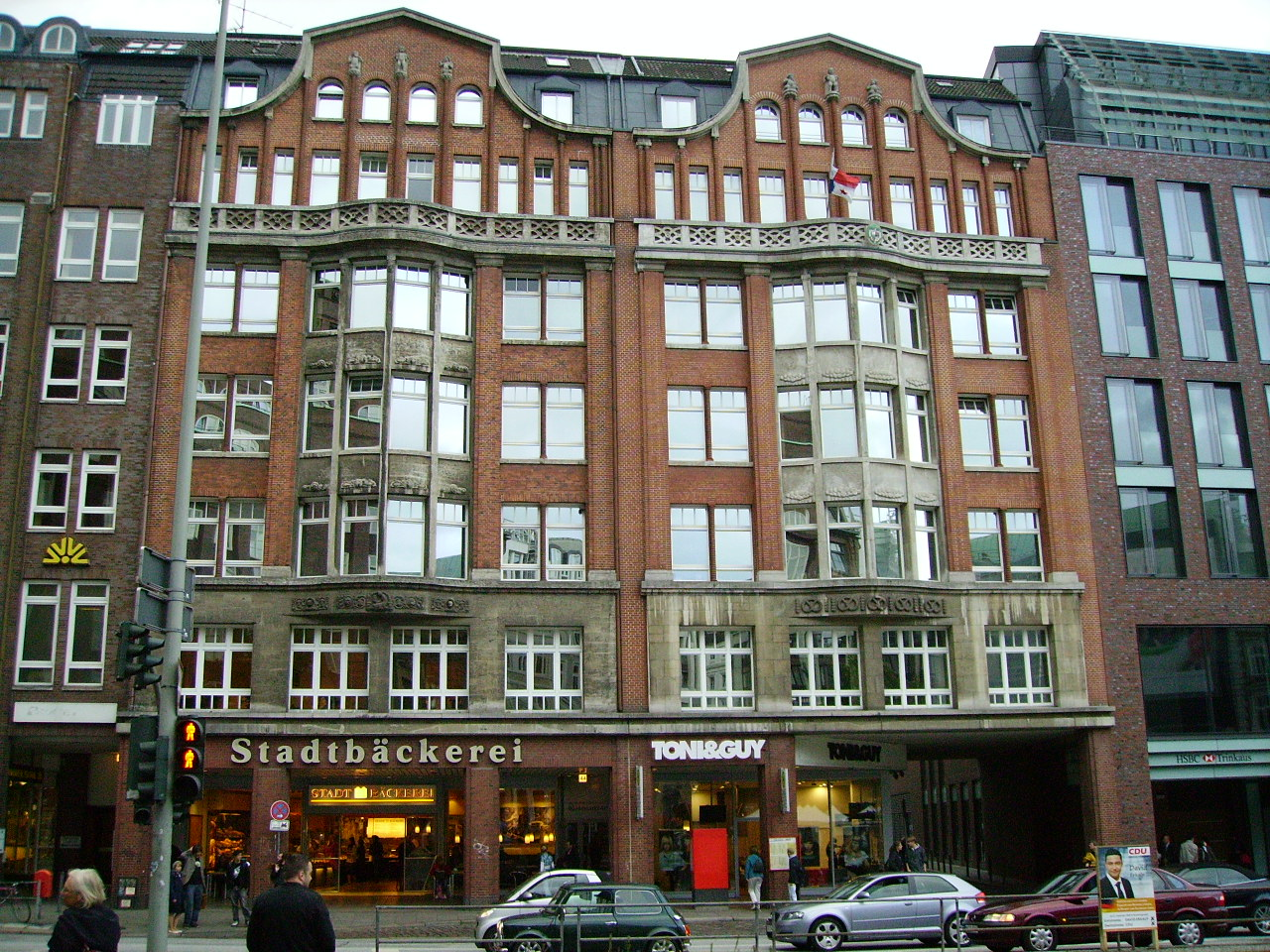
Building hosting the consulate-general in Hamburg

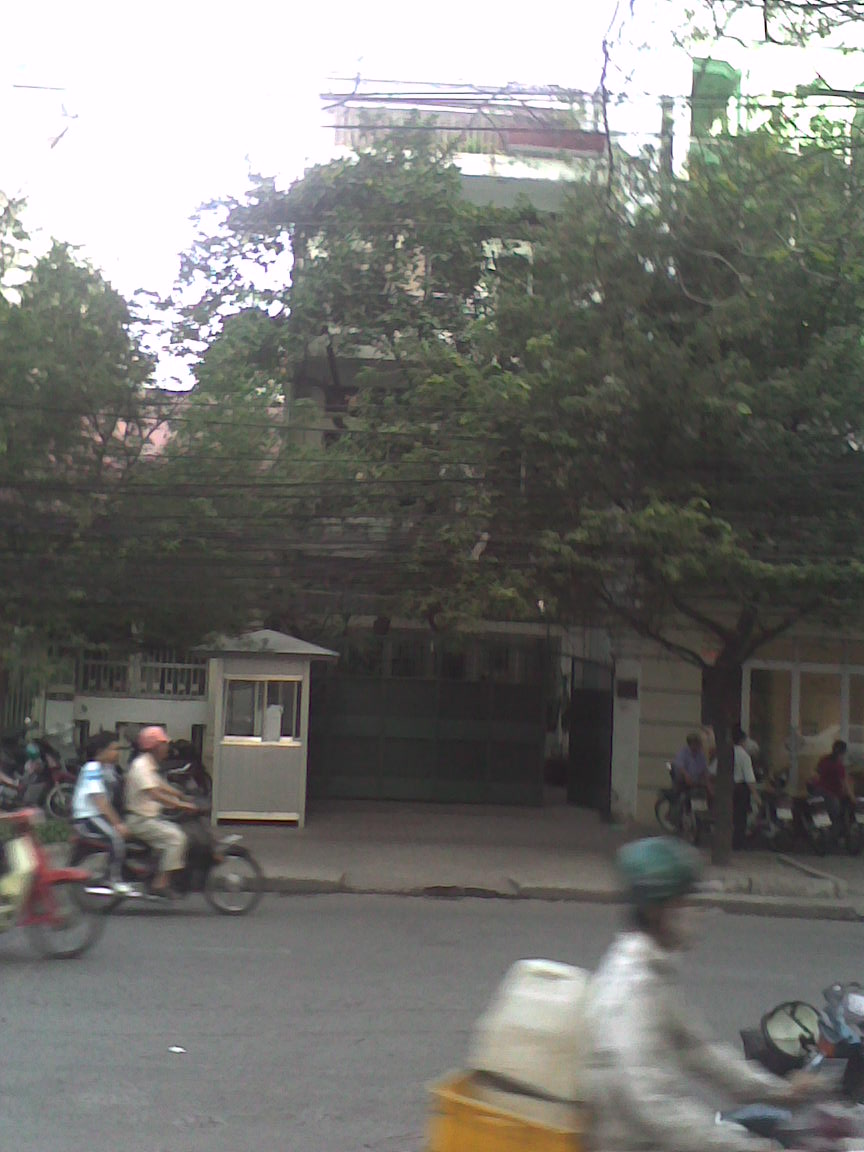
Consulate-General in Ho Chi Minh City

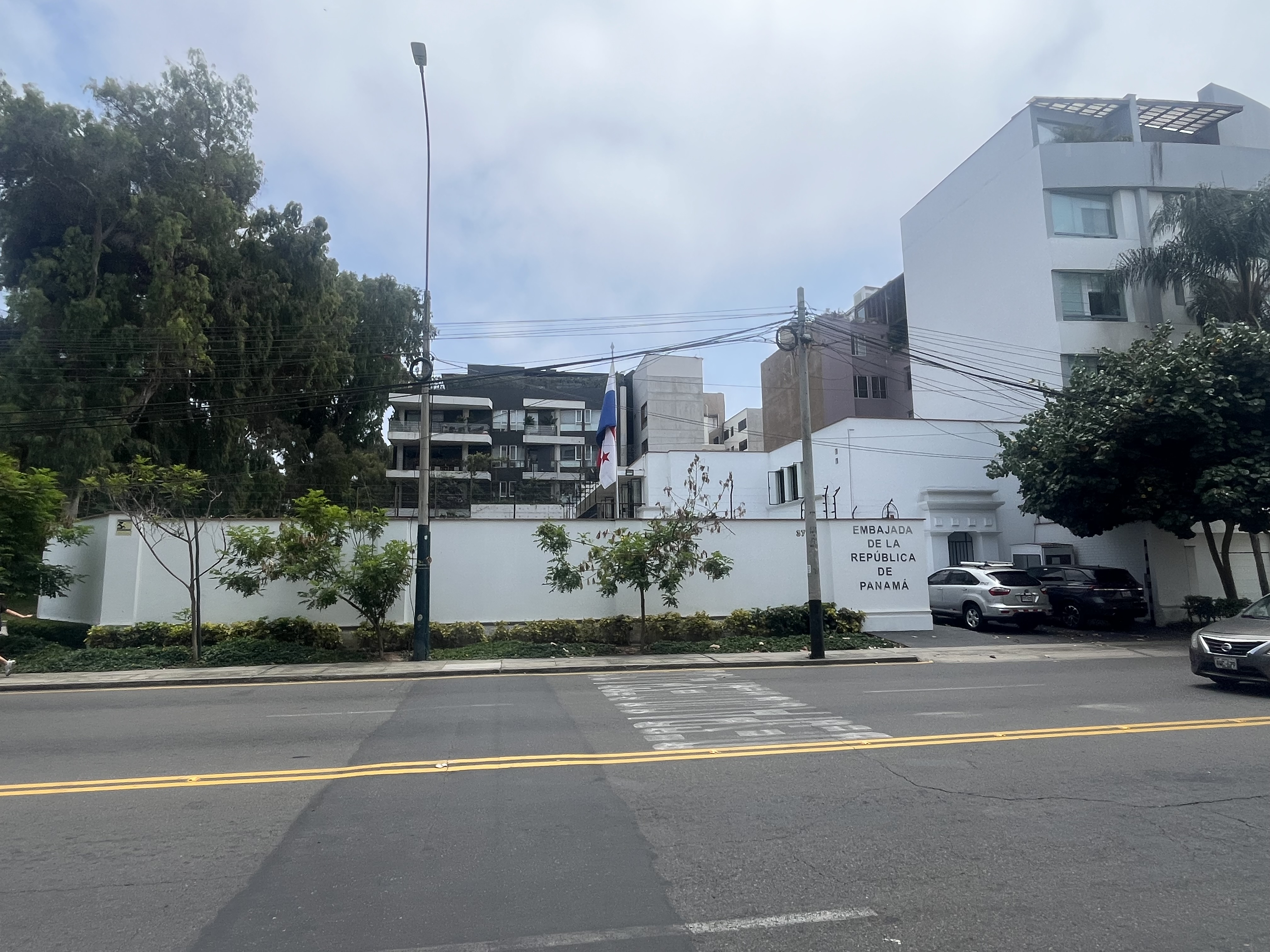
Embassy in Lima

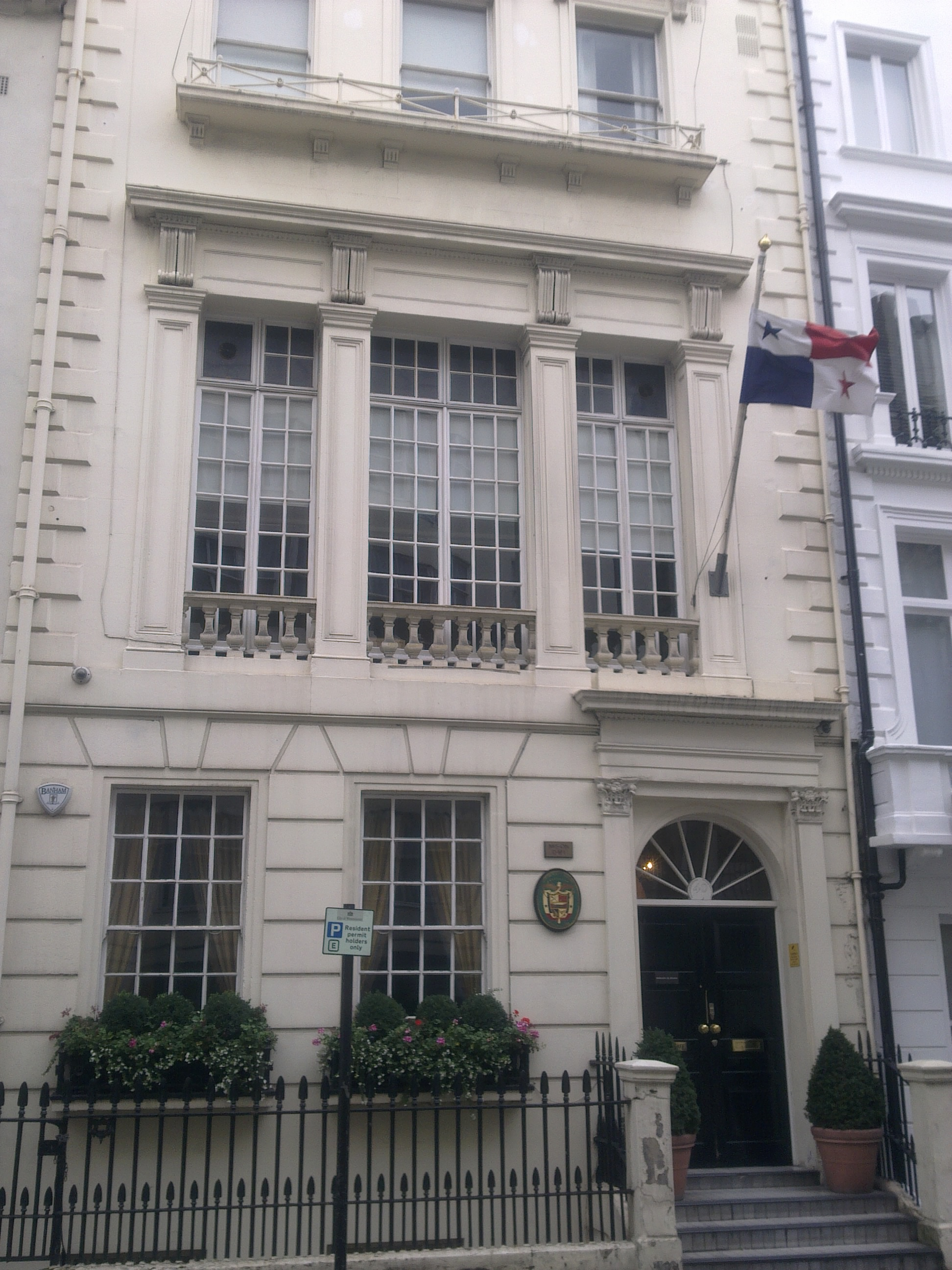
Embassy in London

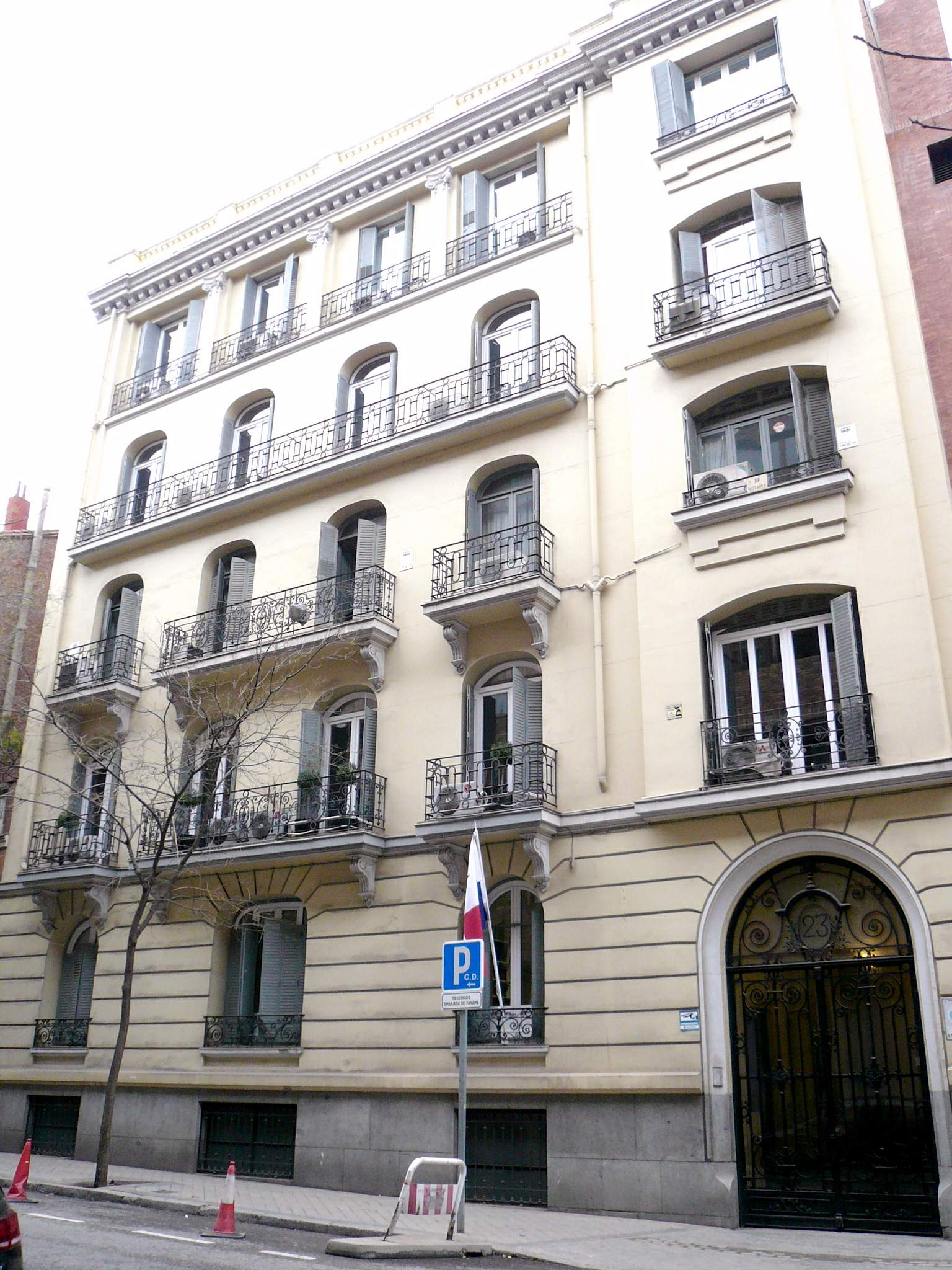
Embassy in Madrid

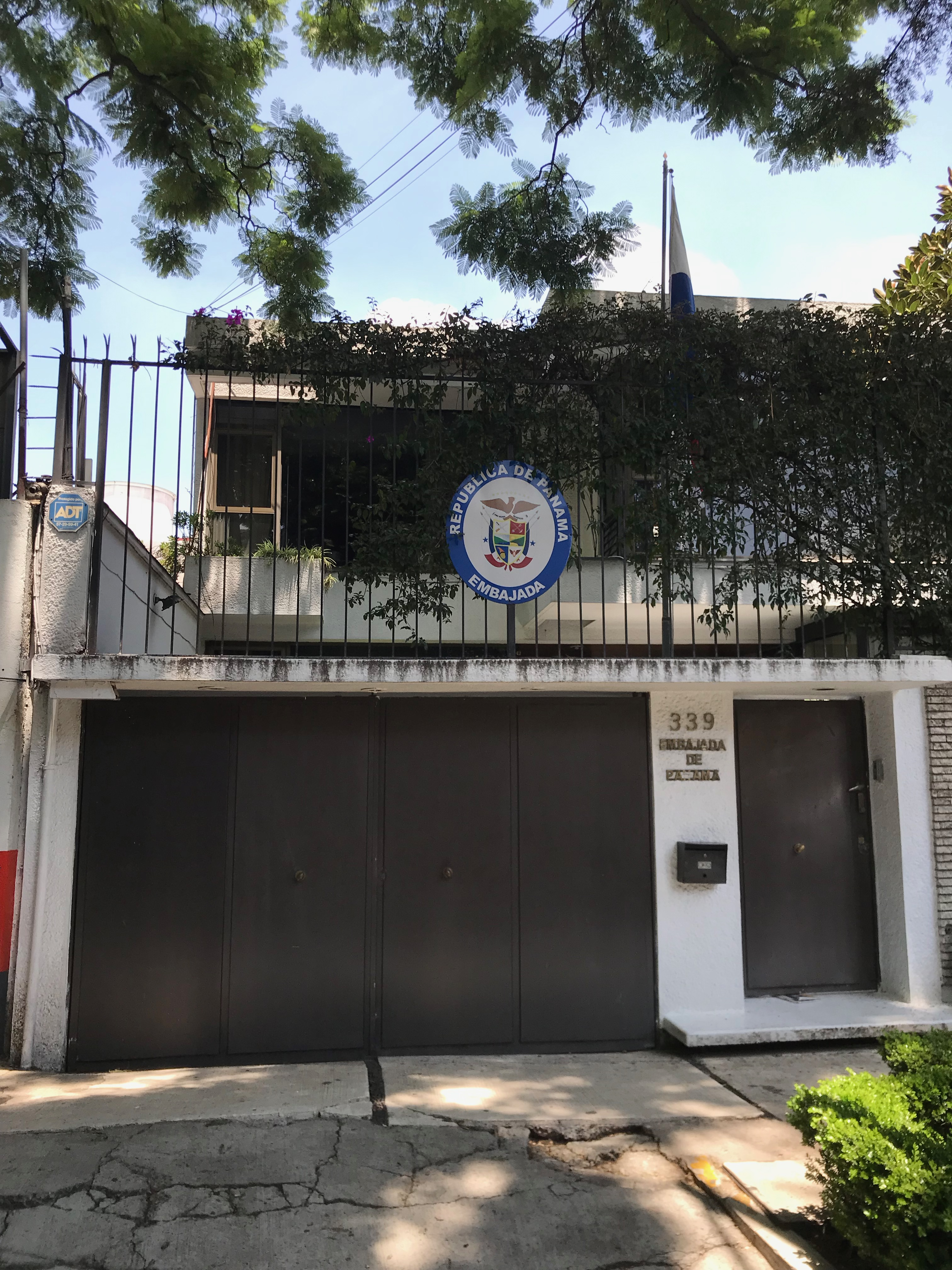
Embassy in Mexico City

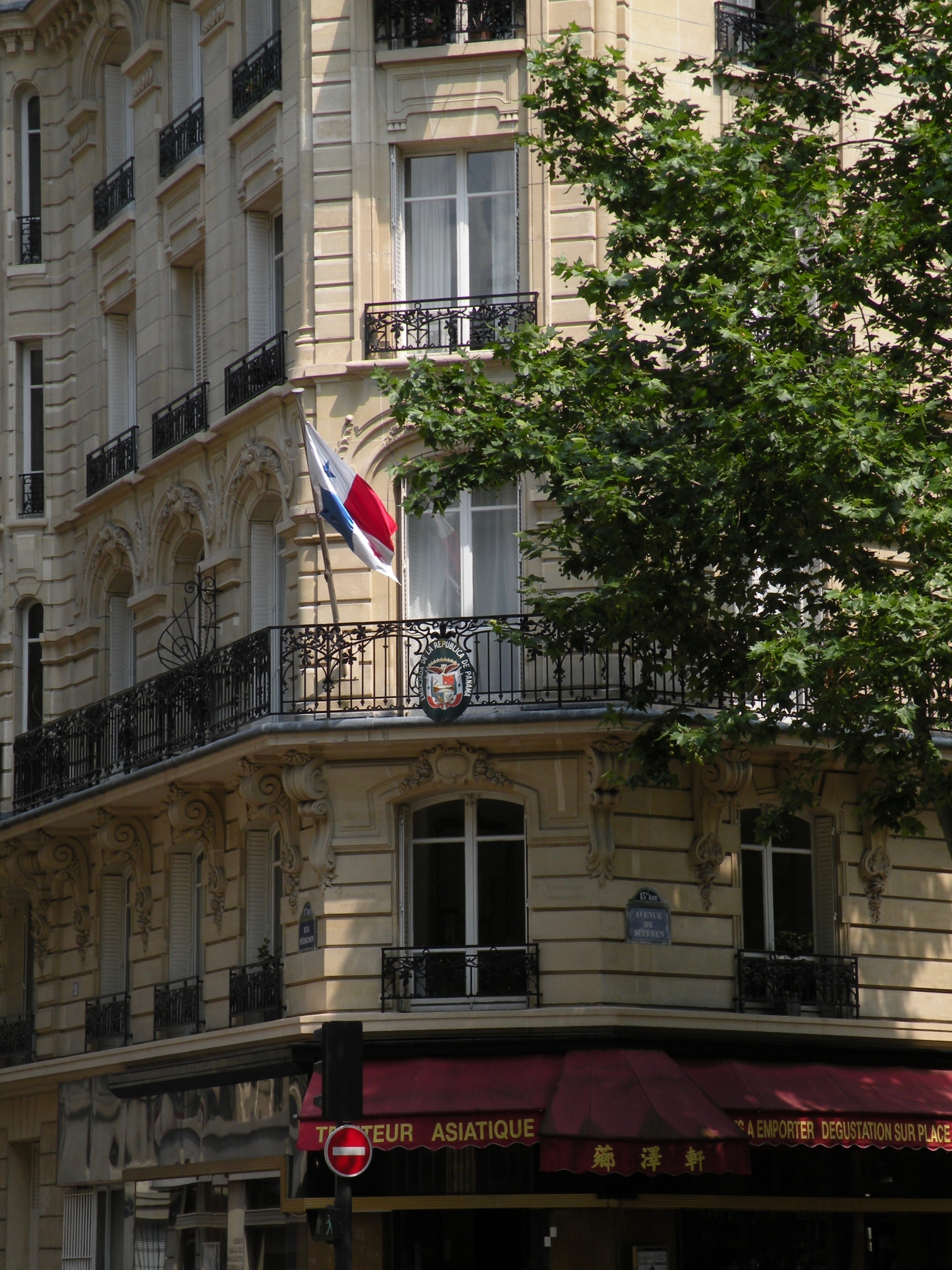
Embassy in Paris

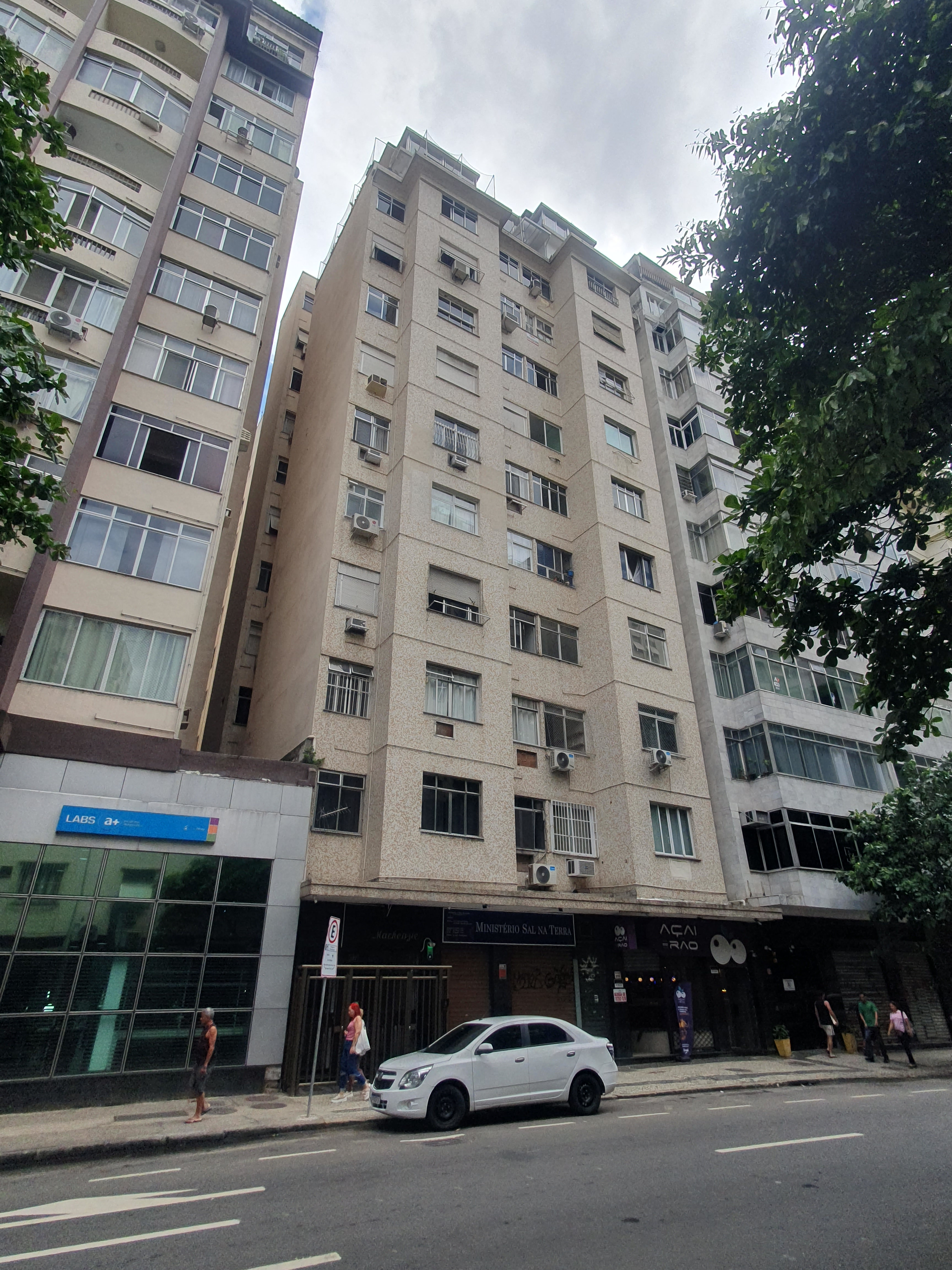
Building hosting the Consulate-General in Rio de Janeiro

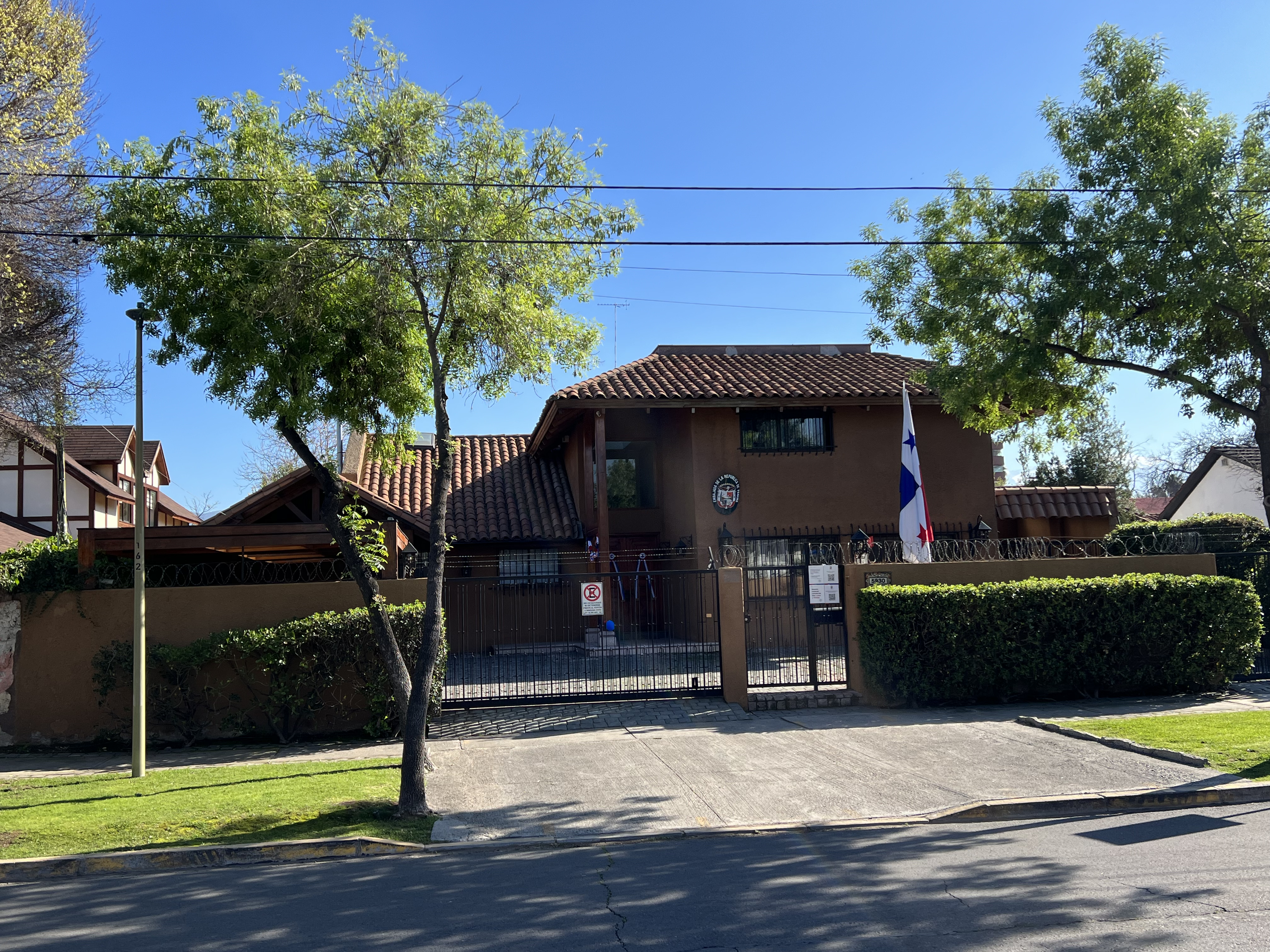
Embassy in Santiago de Chile

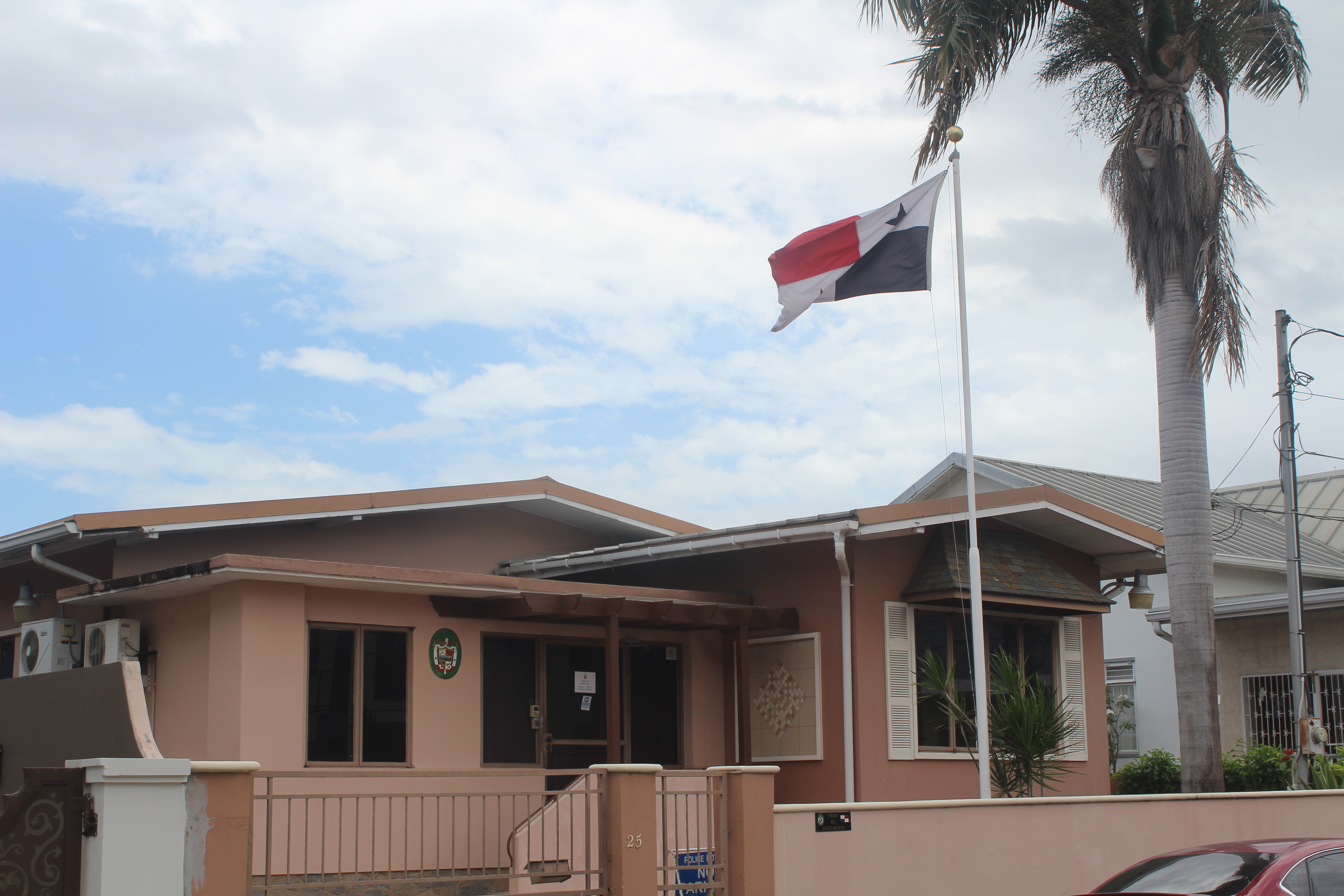
Embassy in Port of Spain

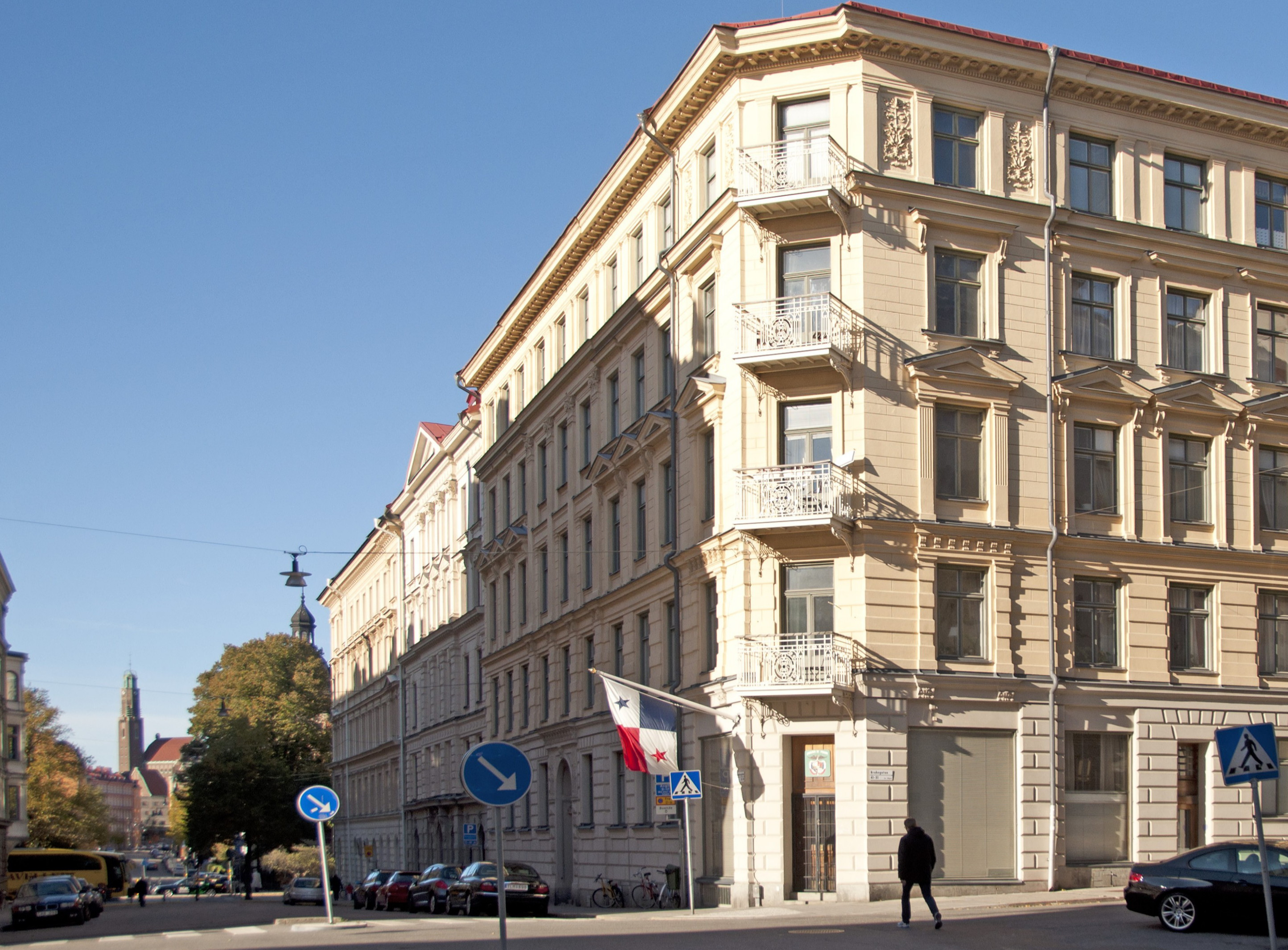
Building hosting the embassy in Stockholm

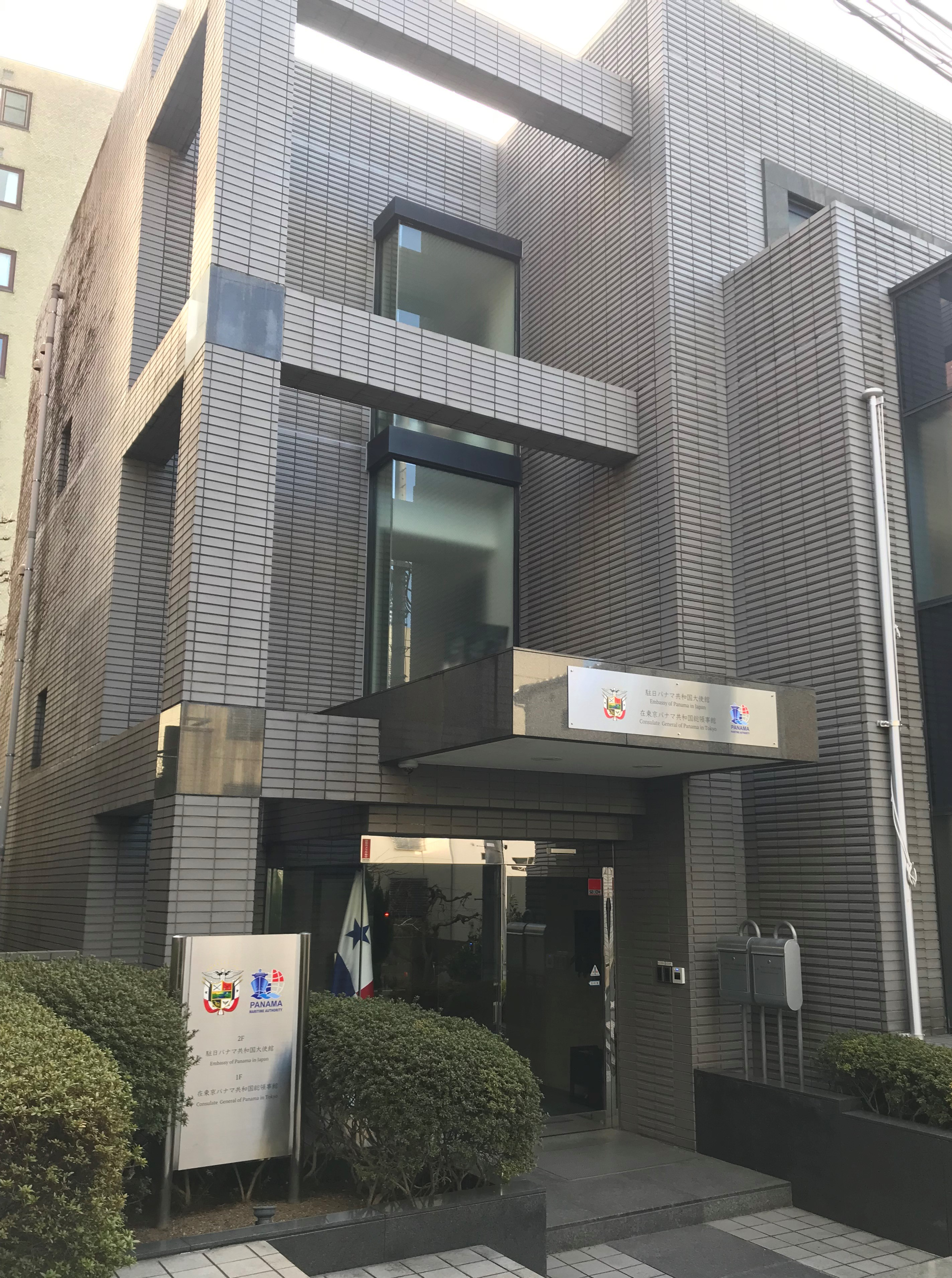
Embassy in Tokyo

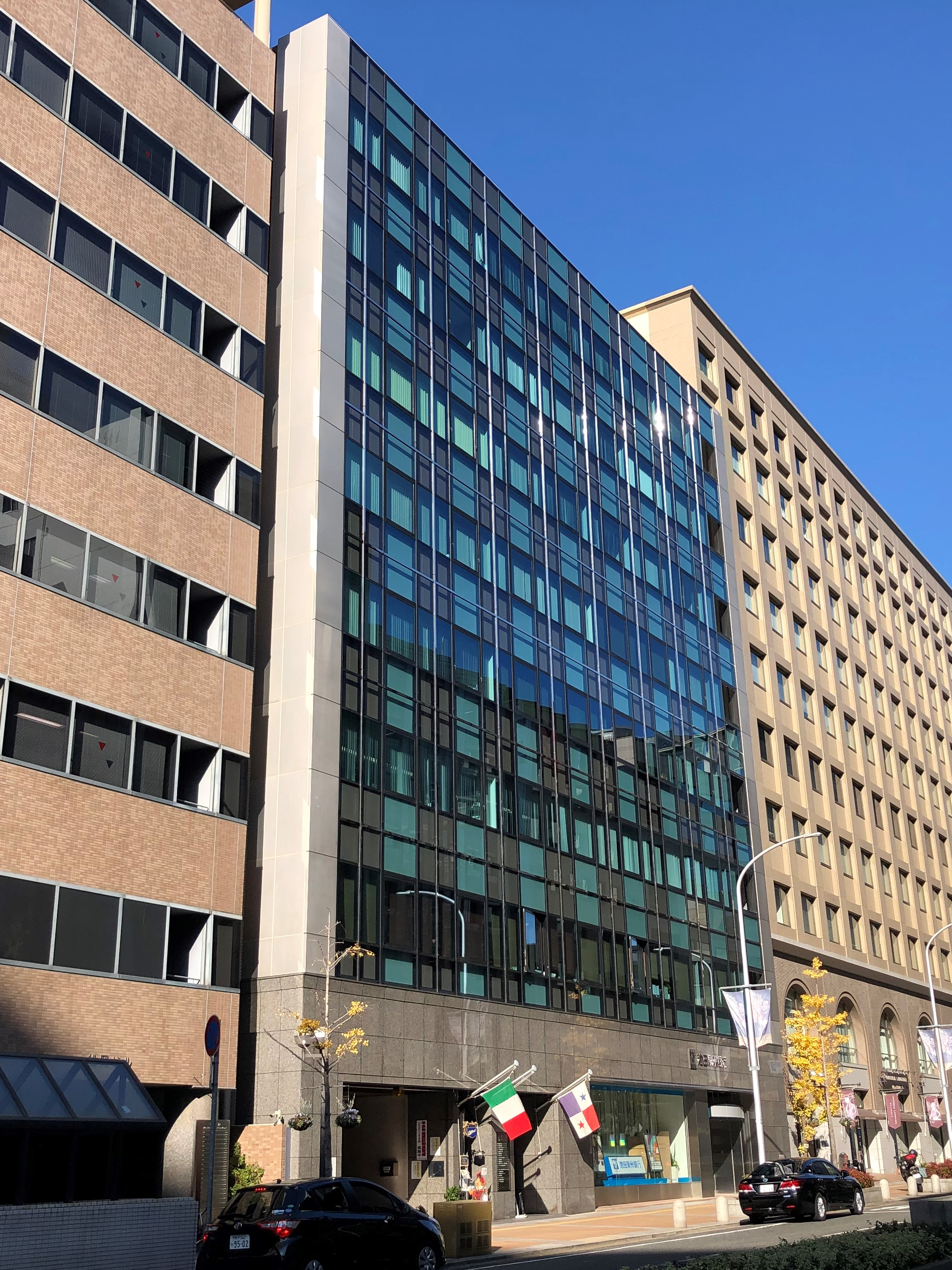
Building hosting the consulate-general in Kobe

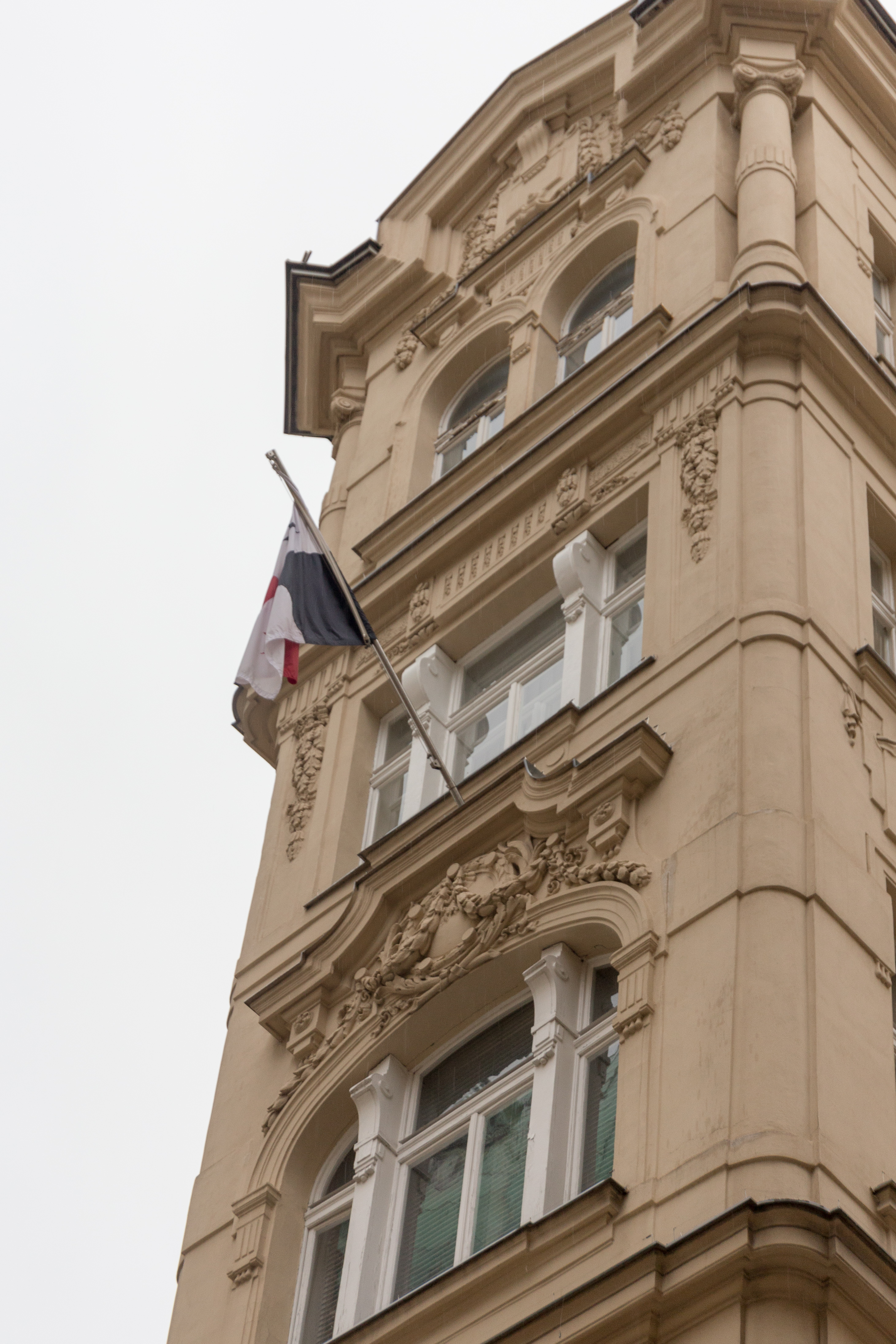
Embassy in Vienna

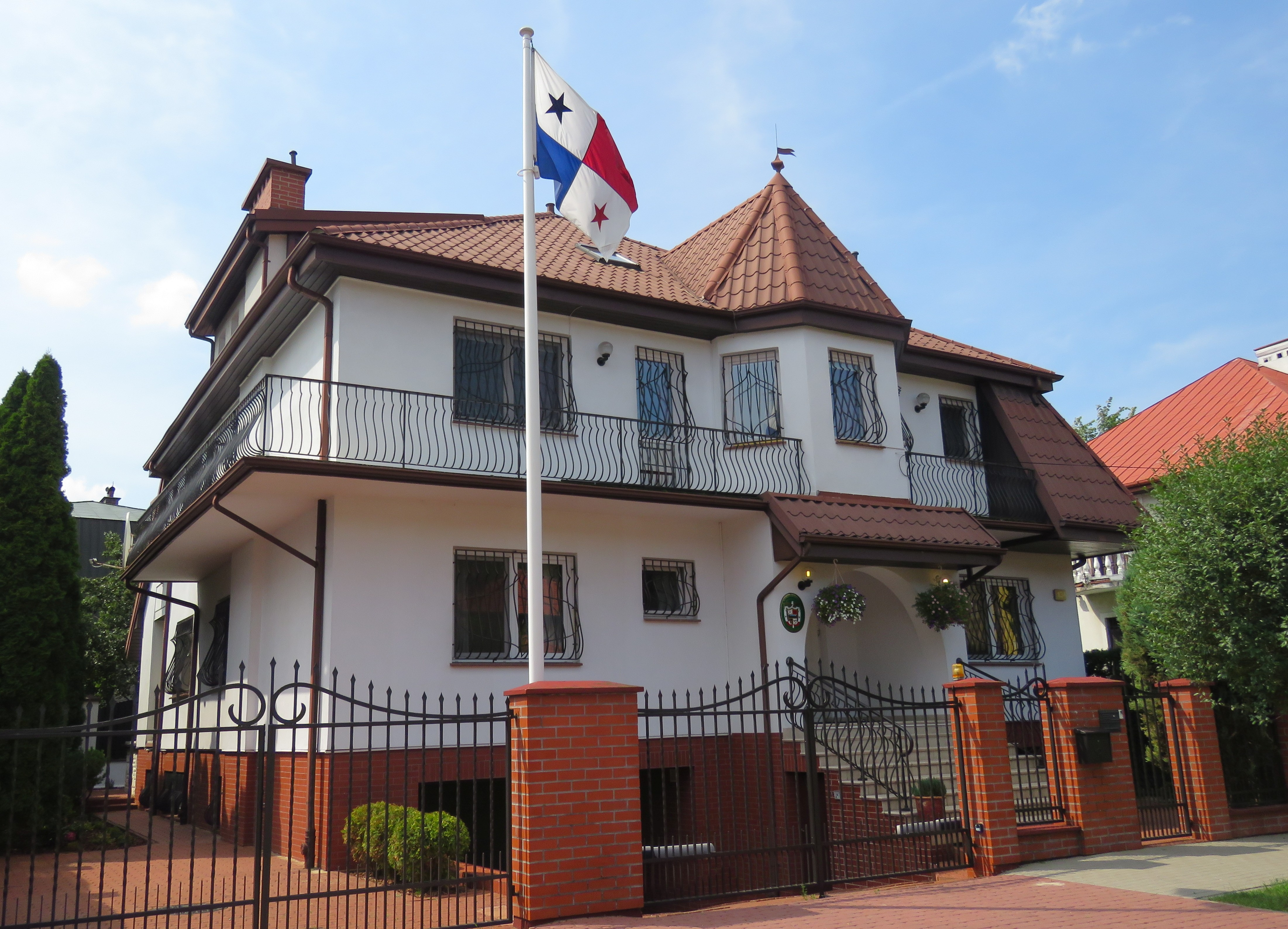
Embassy in Warsaw

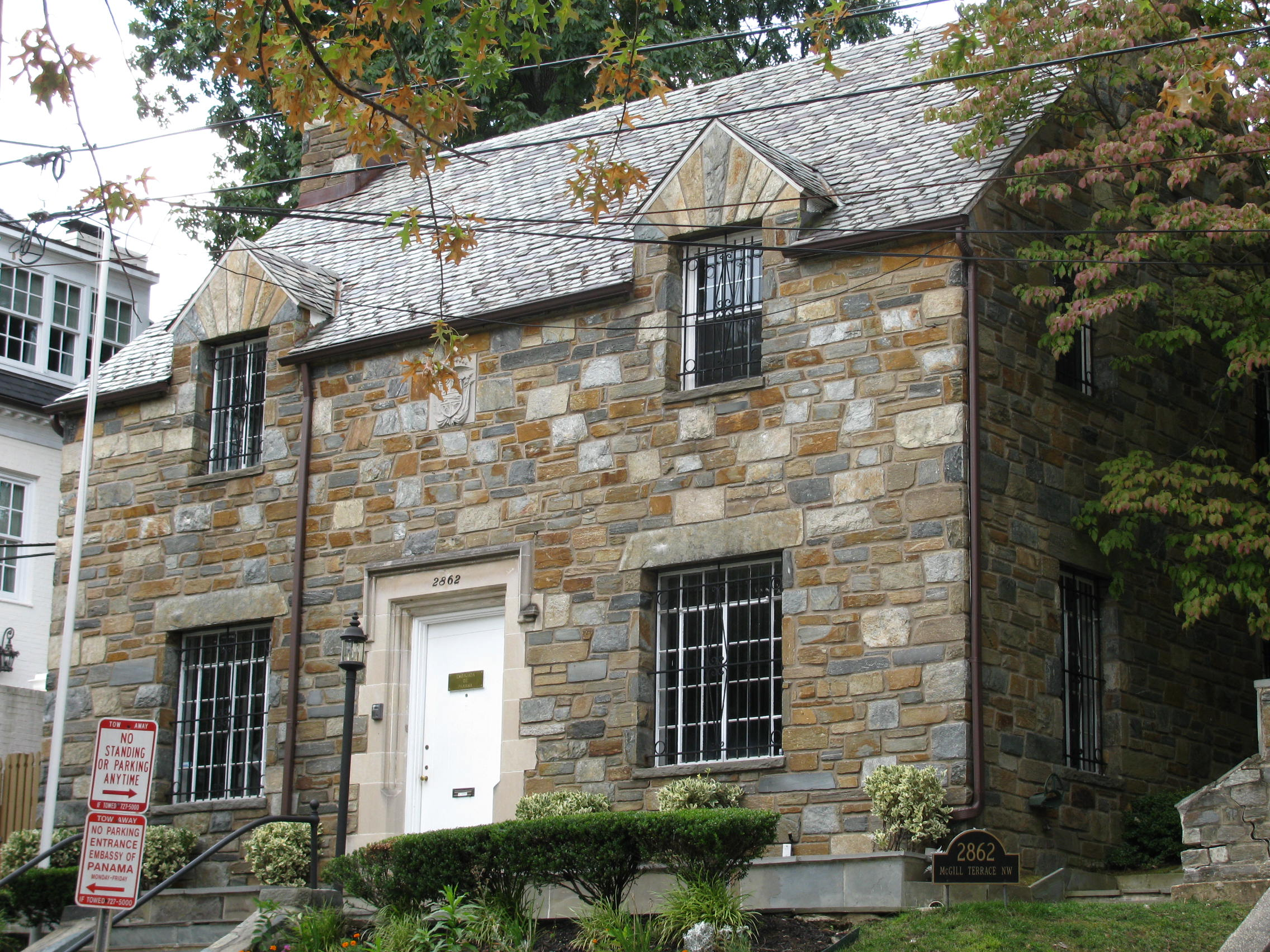
Embassy in Washington, D.C.

== Closed missions ==
=== Americas ===
Host country	Host city	Mission	Year closed	Ref.
Brazil	São Paulo	Consulate-General	2018	
Peru	Arequipa	Consulate	1993	
United States	San Juan, Puerto Rico	Consulate-General	Unknown	
Venezuela	Caracas	Embassy	2024	

=== Asia ===
Host country	Host city	Mission	Year closed	Ref.
Republic of China (Taiwan)	Taipei	Embassy	2017	

== See also ==
- Foreign relations of Panama
- List of diplomatic missions in Panama
- Visa policy of Panama
