= Panamanian passport =

Passport issued to citizens of Panama

Panamanian passport; Pasaporte panameño
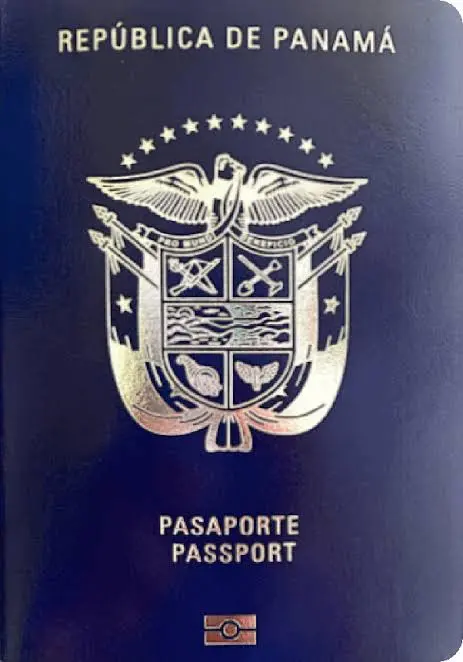
- The front cover of the new Panamanian biometric passport.

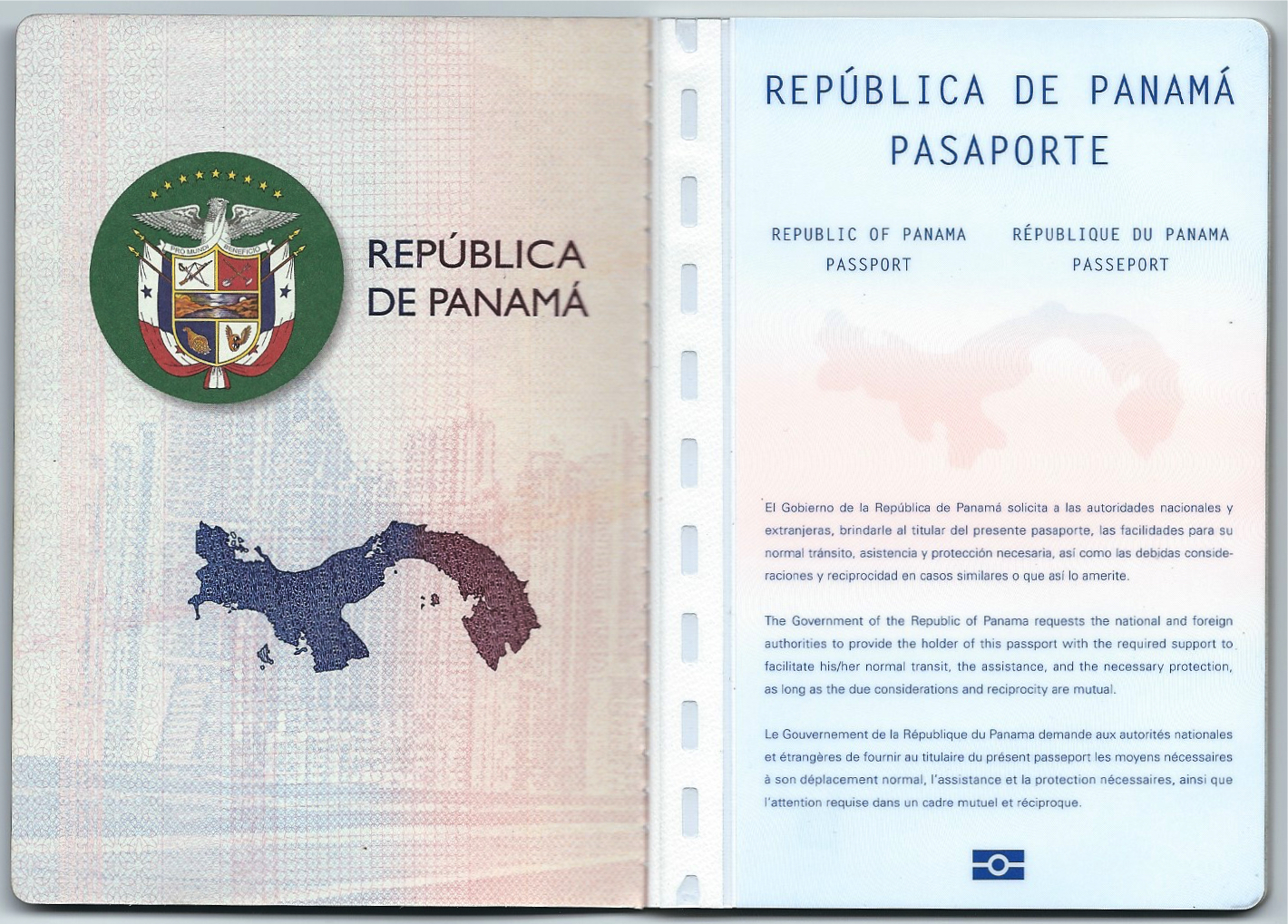
- First and second page of a Panama biometric passport
- Type: Passport
- Issued by: Panama
- First issued: 01/06/2014 (biometric passport)
- Purpose: Identification
- Eligibility: Panamanian citizenship
- Expiration: 5 years after acquisition
- Cost: $100 (ordinary) / $180 (frequent traveler)

A Panamanian passport (Spanish: Pasaporte panameño) is the passport issued to citizens of Panama to facilitate international travel. Panamanian citizens enjoy visa-free access to 118 countries and territories. The passports are issued by the Passports Authority of Panama.

== Design ==
The cover of the passport has a dark blue background. The front part of the cover has the words "REPÚBLICA DE PANAMÁ" (Republic of Panama) on top, the coat of arms of Panama in the middle, and the word "PASAPORTE" (passport) on the bottom in Spanish, English and French. All of this is outlined in a grey color. The back part of the cover only has the blue background. The biometric passport symbol appears at the bottom of the front cover under the word "PASSPORT".

As of January 2016, Panamanian passports are still issued with Panama's old coat of arms, having 9 stars instead of 10. This change took effect in January 2014. This is because blank passports are bought in bulk from a supplier and issued later. It can take several years for a passport to be issued after it has been made.

=== Identity information page ===
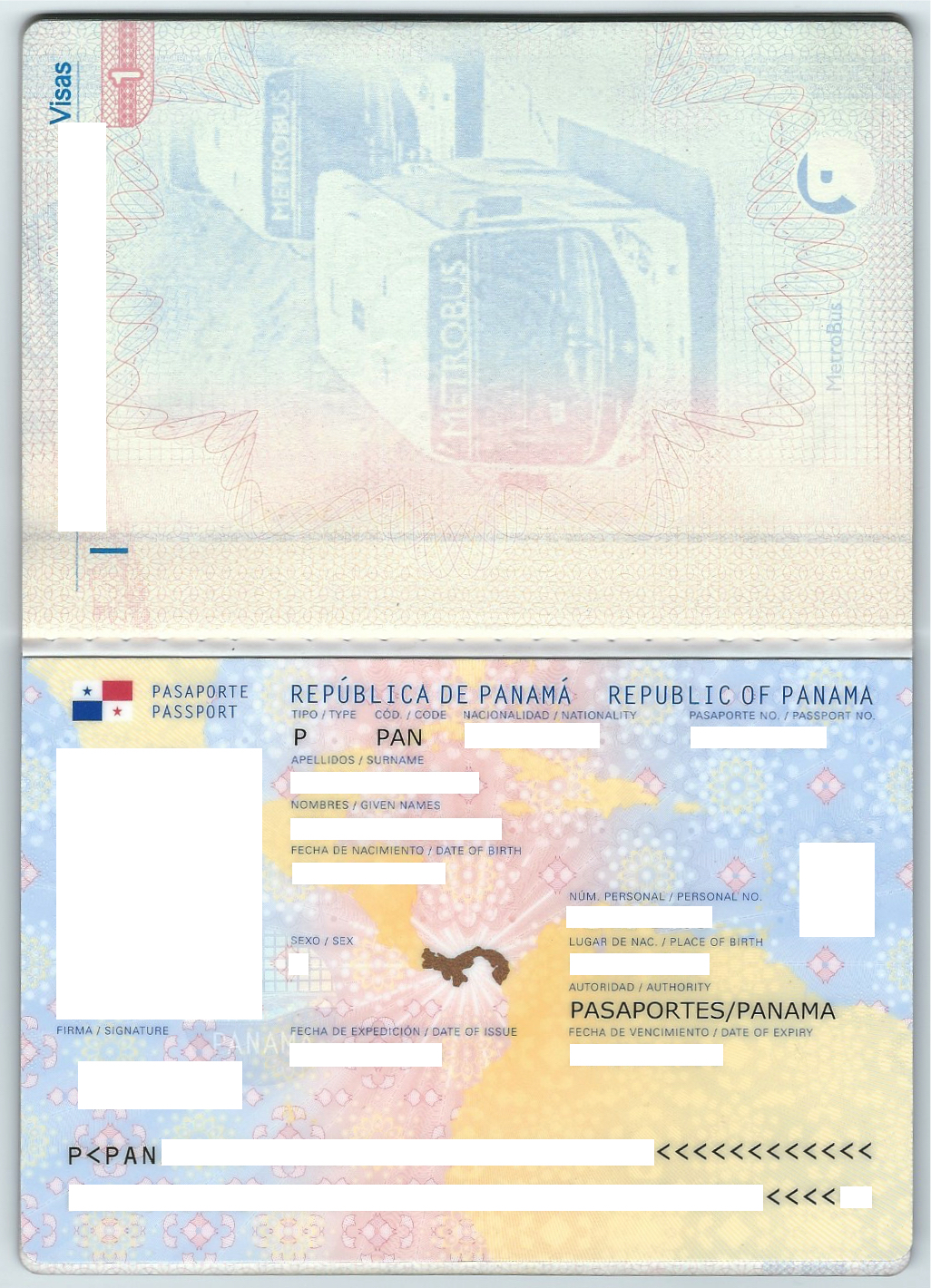
Data Page of a Panama biometric passport

The Panamanian passport includes the following data on the identity information page:

- Photograph of the owner/holder (digital image printed on page)
- Type (P)
- Code (PAN)
- Nationality
- Passport Number
- Surname
- Given Names
- Sex (Gender)
- Personal Number
- Place of Birth (only the country is listed, even if born inside Panama)
- Authority
- Holder's signature (digital image printed on page)
- Date of Issue
- Date of Expiry
- Machine Readable Zone starting with P<PAN

=== Languages ===
The identity information page is printed in Spanish and English.

=== Visa pages ===
The passport contains 32 pages for visas. Each with an image of a planned or finished project of the 2009-2014 government of Panama as a background. The pages include the following:

- MetroBus (finished)
- Construction of Panama Metro line 1 (Pages 2 and 18) (finished)
- 'Cadena de Frio' Market (Pages 3 and 27) (finished)
- Educational Centres of Curundú (finished)
- Cinta Costera (Pages 5 and 15) (finished)
- New prison system (Pages 7 and 24) (finished)
- $100 at 70 (now 120 at 65) (finished)
- Panama Canal expansion (finished)
- 'Irving Saladino' housing complex (finished)
- Madden Highway (finished)
- Hospital city (under construction)
- Tocumen International Airport (Pages 12 and 28) (finished)
- Enrique Malek International Airport (finished)
- Río Hato Airport (finished)
- Curundú Housing Complex (Midsection, pages 16 and 17) (finished)
- Casco Viejo renovation (ongoing)
- 'December 24' Hospital (finished)
- Social Interest Housing (finished)
- Internet For Everyone (finished)
- Country Brand (finished)
- 'Gazas de Pacora' primary care centre (finished)
- Governmental City (planned)
- Enrique Adolfo Jiménez Airport (finished)
- Renewable energy (ongoing)
- Student school supplies (program terminated)
- Panama bay Sanitation(finished)

== Passport message ==
All passports contain the following message:

In Spanish:

El Gobierno de la República de Panamá solicita a las autoridades nacionales y extranjeras, brindarle al titular del presente pasaporte, las facilidades para su normal tránsito, asistencia y protección necesaria, así como las debidas consideraciones y reciprocidad en casos similares o que así lo amerite.

In English:

The Government of the Republic of Panama request the national and foreign authorities to provide the holder of this passport with the required support to facilitate his/her normal transit, the assistance, and the necessary protection, as long as the due considerations and reciprocity are mutual.

In French:

Le Gouvernement de la République du Panama demande aux autorités nationales et étrangères de fournir au titulaire du présent passeport les moyens nécessaires à son déplacement normal, l'assistance et la protection nécessaires, ainsi que l'attention requise dans un cadre mutuel et réciproque.

== Visa requirements ==
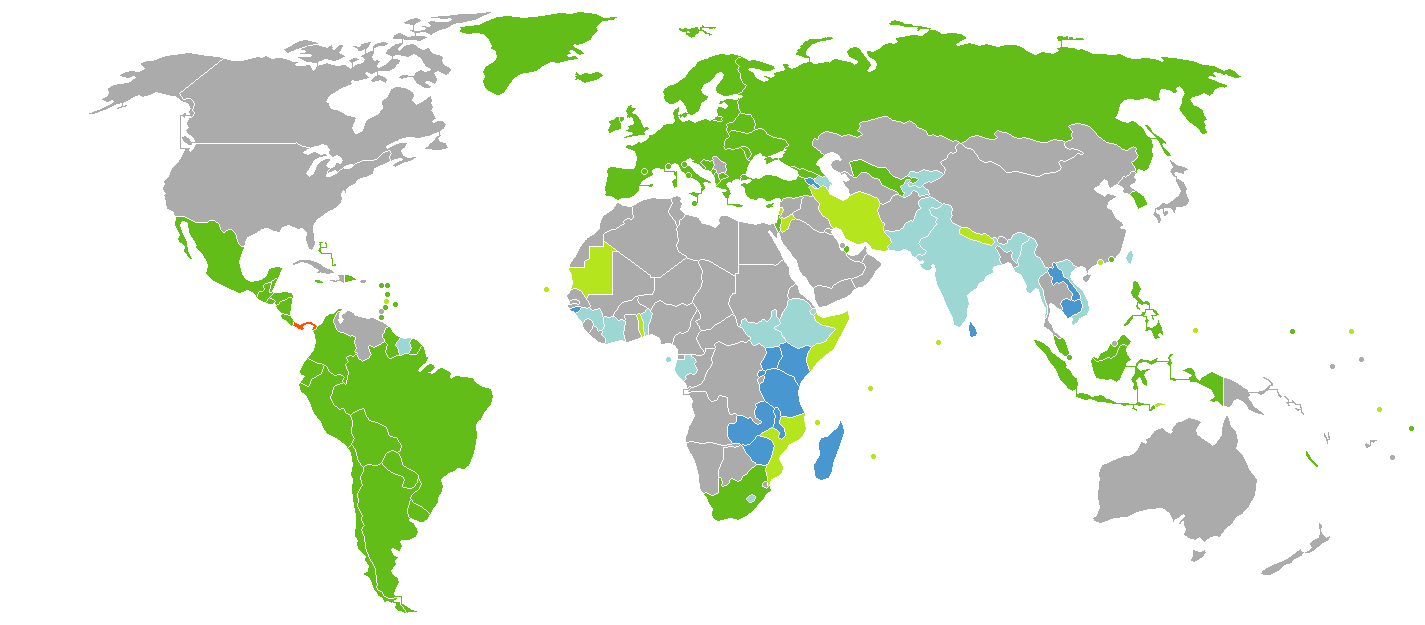
Visa requirements for Panamanian citizens Panama Visa free access Visa on arrival Electronic visa available Visa required

In 2015, Panamanian citizens had visa-free or visa on arrival access to 127 countries and territories, ranking the Panamanian passport 36th in the world according to the Henley Passport Index.

== Electronic passport ==
Panama unveiled an electronic passport, in late 2012, with a supposed implementation in 2013, in either March, or October. Because of this, it was necessary to present a travel reservation to request a passport for the first time; older, expired passports (with expiration dates after December 2007) merely had their validity extended.

In January 2014 Panama finally started issuing electronic passports to its citizens. Its cost increased from $50 to $100, and the inside contains images of recent government projects.

== Types ==
- Ordinary passport (Grey outline) – Issued for ordinary travel, such as holidays and business trips.
- Diplomatic passport (Gold outline) – Issued to Panamanian diplomats, top ranking government officials and diplomatic couriers.
- Emergency travel document – Issued when Panamanians lose the document outside of Panama and must return home.. Must be ordered at a Panamanian embassy or consulate.

== Passport fees ==
Fees as of 1 January 2014
Type of Citizen	32 Pages	64 Pages
Regular	$100	$180
Retired	$50	$90

== Pavlo Lazarenko scandal ==
In 1998 Pavlo Lazarenko, the former Prime minister of Ukraine was arrested due to money laundering charges as he tried to enter Switzerland. He was found to be carrying an apparently valid Panamanian passport.

== See also ==
- List of passports
- Visa requirements for Panamanian citizens

== Sources ==
- Council regulation 539/2001.
- Council regulation 1932/2006.
- Council regulation 539/2001 consolidated version, 19.1.2007.
- List of nationals who do need a visa to visit the UK.
- List of countries whose passport holders do not require visas to enter Ireland from CitizensInformation.ie.
- Embassy of Panama in Washington D.C.
- Canal Zone registry.
- Panama's Immigration and Naturalization Department / Dirección Nacional de Migración y Naturalización
- List of countries whose passport holders do and do not need visas to travel to Panama from the Embassy of Panama in Washington D.C (Wayback Machine).
- MIRE Panama's foreign affairs ministry. (Spanish page only)
- For Passport applications and procedures / Bienvenidos al Ministerio de Gobierno y Justicia Panama's government and justice ministry (Spanish page only)
- Panama Passport Agency (Spanish page only) / Sistema de pasaporte-Pma.
