= Visa policy of Panama =

Policy on permits required to enter Panama

Visitors to Panama must obtain a visa from one of the Panamanian diplomatic missions unless they are citizens from one of the visa-exempt countries.

All visitors must hold a passport valid for at least 3 months from the date of arrival.

== Visa policy map ==
Visa policy of Panama Panama Visa not required (180 days) Visa not required (90 days) Visa not required (30 days) Visa not required (30 days) if holding a valid multiple-entry visa or residence permit issued by any European Union member state, Australia, Canada, Japan, Singapore, South Korea, the UK or the US; otherwise, visa required

== Visa exemption ==
=== Ordinary passports ===
Citizens of the following countries and territories may enter Panama without a visa for the following period:

180 days

- Canada
- United States

90 days

- All European Union member states

- Andorra
- Antigua and Barbuda
- Argentina
- Armenia
- Australia
- Bahamas
- Barbados
- Belarus
- Belize
- Bhutan
- Bolivia
- Bosnia and Herzegovina
- Botswana
- Brazil
- Brunei
- Cambodia
- Chile
- Colombia
- Comoros
- Costa Rica
- Dominica
- Ecuador
- El Salvador
- Fiji
- Grenada
- Guatemala
- Guyana
- Honduras
- Iceland
- Israel
- Jamaica
- Japan
- Kiribati
- Kuwait
- Liechtenstein
- Madagascar
- Malaysia
- Maldives
- Marshall Islands
- Mauritius
- Mexico
- Micronesia
- Moldova
- Monaco
- Mongolia
- Montenegro
- Namibia
- Nauru
- New Zealand
- Nicaragua
- North Macedonia
- Norway
- Palau
- Papua New Guinea
- Paraguay
- Peru
- Qatar
- Russia
- Saint Kitts and Nevis
- Saint Lucia
- Saint Vincent and the Grenadines
- Samoa
- San Marino
- São Tomé and Príncipe
- Saudi Arabia
- Serbia
- Seychelles
- Singapore
- Solomon Islands
- South Africa
- South Korea
- Switzerland
- Taiwan
- Thailand
- Tonga
- Trinidad and Tobago
- Turkey
- Tuvalu
- Ukraine
- United Arab Emirates
- United Kingdom
- Uruguay
- Vanuatu
- Vatican City
- Vietnam

30 days

- Hong Kong

Date of visa changes
- 14 July 1997: Israel
- 9 August 2001: South Korea
- 8 May 2012: Angola^{3}, Armenia, Belarus, Bhutan, Botswana, Cambodia, Cape Verde^{3}, Comoros, Croatia, Fiji, Gabon^{3}, Georgia^{3}, Kenya^{3}, Kiribati, Madagascar, Malaysia, Maldives, Marshall Islands, Mauritius, Moldova, Mongolia, Montenegro, Nauru, Namibia, North Macedonia (as Macedonia), Palau, Papua New Guinea, Samoa, São Tomé and Príncipe, Serbia, Seychelles, Solomon Islands, Tonga, Tuvalu, Ukraine, Vanuatu, Vietnam
- 14 April 2014: Russia
- 10 February 2019: Hong Kong

Cancelled:

- 1 October 2017: Venezuela
- 8 June 2023: Angola, Cape Verde, Gabon, Georgia, Kenya

In addition, all passengers with a national ID card or a birth certificate issued by Panama may enter Panama without a visa, regardless of passports they use to travel.

==== Substitute visa ====
Citizens of other countries who would normally require visas may enter Panama for a maximum stay of 30 days if they are holding a valid multiple-entry visa or residence permit issued by the following countries. Residence permits and visas must be valid for at least 6 months from the date of arrival.

- Any European Union member state

- Australia
- Canada
- Japan
- Singapore
- South Korea
- United Kingdom
- United States^{1}

_{1 - For holders of a permanent residence card (Green Card) only.}

=== Non-ordinary passports ===
In addition to countries whose citizens are visa-exempt, holders of diplomatic passports of China, Cuba, Dominican Republic, Haiti, Indonesia, Philippines and Venezuela may enter Panama without a visa.

== Panama Friendly Nations Visa ==
In 2012, the Government of Panama launched the Friendly Nations Visa. The visa is open to the citizens of fifty countries deemed to have positive diplomatic and economic ties to Panama. To qualify, the citizens of those countries must present professional or economic ties to Panama. Once the applicant demonstrates those ties, they are eligible for permanent residency and a work permit in Panama. After three to five years, holders of this visa can apply for Panamanian citizenship.

== Transit without a Visa ==
Citizens of Cuba and Haiti require a visa at all times, including for transit. Other countries may transit in Panama without a visa for 12 hours if they have a confirmed onward ticket.

== Visitor statistics ==
Most visitors arriving in Panama via Tocumen International Airport were from the following countries of nationality:

Country	2016	2015	2014
United States	309,358	338,590	269,965
Venezuela	281,540	260,145	187,776
Colombia	267,188	288,569	281,775
Brazil	79,758	88,348	81,950
Mexico	68,646	80,637	68,340
Spain	78,246	79,461	61,596
Costa Rica	63,548	75,196	56,775
Ecuador	70,712	74,043	71,919
Argentina	68,088	70,089	60,040
Peru	46,076	50,275	34,844
Total	1,857,268	1,941,106	1,609,937

== See also ==
- Visa requirements for Panamanian citizens
- List of diplomatic missions of Panama
