= Panama–Uruguay relations =

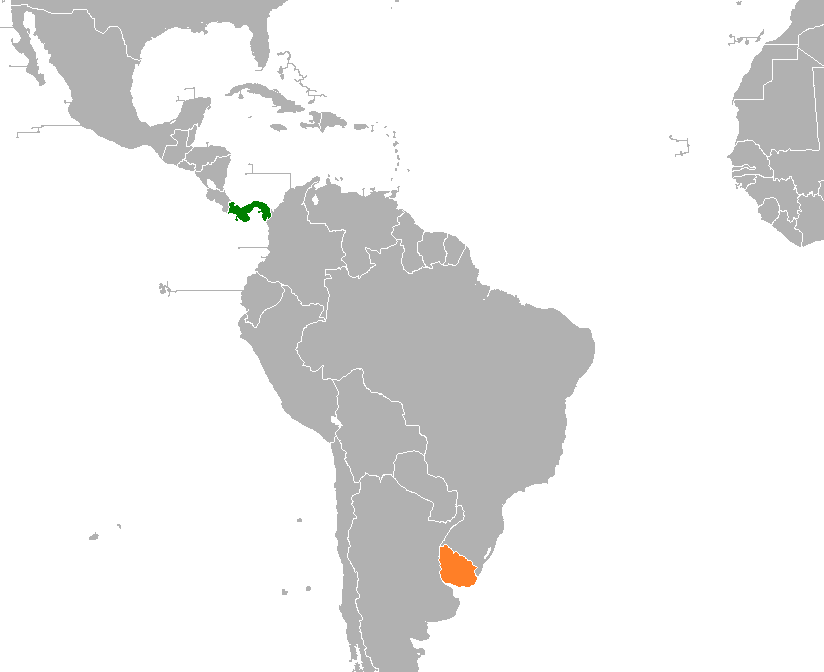
- Panama: Uruguay

Panama and Uruguay have had diplomatic relations since 1904. Both countries are members of the Organization of American States.

== History ==
Just a week after its separation from Colombia, on November 10, 1903, the newly established Republic of Panama sent a letter (through its Minister of Foreign Affairs Francisco Vicente de la Espriella) to the government of the Oriental Republic of Uruguay, requesting diplomatic recognition. The two states established diplomatic links on October 28, 1904.

On October 15, 1912, Uruguay appointed Guillermo Irarrazaval Smith as its consul in Panama. Panama responded by appointing Rodolfo Castella as its consul in Uruguay. However, neither of the two men shifted their residence their mission country. Castella was accredited as the consul of Uruguay in Panama on November 10, 1914, but as he did not occupy his position as consul the Panamanian government cancelled his accreditation in July 1915.

In late 1918, Baltasar Brum, Minister of Foreign Affairs and president-elect of Uruguay, visited Panama. The purpose of the visit is unknown, but an official banquet was organized in his honour in Panama.

== Establishment of diplomatic missions ==
On March 13, 1924, the Panamanian government decided to establish a legation in Uruguay. The Panamanian envoy in Buenos Aires, Juan Ehrman Lefevre, was appointed as the representative of Panama towards Uruguay. In January 1925 Panama appointed Magín Pons as its honorary consul in Montevideo.

In January 1927, the Uruguayan government decided to established a general consulate based in Mexico City, which jurisdiction included Panama.

Both countries are members of the Group of 77.

== See also ==
- Foreign relations of Panama
- Foreign relations of Uruguay
