= Foreign relations of Panama =

Panama's foreign relations are conventional in outlook, with Panama being especially aligned with United States since the 1989 US invasion to topple the regime of General Manuel Noriega. The United States cooperates with the Panamanian government in promoting economic, political, security, and social development through U.S. and international agencies.

== Diplomatic relations ==
List of countries which Panama maintains diplomatic relations with:

#	Country	Date
1	United States	13 November 1903
2	France	18 November 1903
3	Russia	21 November 1903
4	Peru	18 December 1903
5	Costa Rica	29 December 1903
6	Japan	7 January 1904
7	Italy	15 January 1904
—	Venezuela (suspended)	3 February 1904
8	Chile	1 March 1904
9	Mexico	1 March 1904
10	Brazil	2 March 1904
11	Switzerland	6 April 1904
12	Cuba	7 April 1904
13	Netherlands	20 April 1904
14	Spain	10 May 1904
15	Portugal	21 May 1904
16	Uruguay	28 October 1904
17	Honduras	18 September 1907
18	Belgium	15 February 1908
19	United Kingdom	9 April 1908
20	Ecuador	1 September 1908
21	El Salvador	9 March 1909
22	Argentina	5 November 1920
—	Holy See	21 September 1923
23	Colombia	9 July 1924
24	Czech Republic	25 March 1929
25	Guatemala	25 January 1935
26	Dominican Republic	17 March 1937
27	Denmark	30 June 1937
28	Sweden	3 July 1937
29	Norway	31 July 1937
30	Nicaragua	13 December 1938
31	Bolivia	26 August 1942
32	Paraguay	31 October 1942
33	Haiti	11 October 1945
34	Lebanon	30 April 1946
35	Israel	18 June 1948
—	Sovereign Military Order of Malta	2 August 1948
36	Turkey	21 September 1950
37	Germany	17 December 1951
38	Serbia	26 March 1953
39	Austria	18 October 1955
40	Greece	5 September 1956
41	Egypt	21 February 1958
42	Madagascar	20 September 1960
43	Canada	11 August 1961
44	India	1 July 1962
45	South Korea	30 September 1962
46	Jamaica	29 July 1966
47	Ethiopia	17 August 1967
48	Pakistan	7 November 1967
49	Cyprus	1 April 1971
50	Romania	5 October 1971
51	Algeria	9 February 1973
52	Guyana	16 March 1973
53	Libya	21 March 1973
54	Bulgaria	29 March 1973
55	Guinea	29 March 1973
56	Poland	15 August 1973
57	Philippines	28 September 1973
58	Guinea-Bissau	16 October 1973
59	Australia	20 February 1974
60	Grenada	18 November 1974
61	Iran	7 January 1975
62	Hungary	5 August 1975
63	Vietnam	28 August 1975
64	Syria	17 February 1976
65	Finland	19 February 1976
66	Malta	19 February 1976
67	Sri Lanka	8 March 1976
68	Kuwait	23 March 1976
69	Iraq	8 June 1976
70	Morocco	15 February 1977
71	Albania	20 August 1978
72	Indonesia	27 March 1979
73	Suriname	1 May 1979
74	Equatorial Guinea	13 May 1981
75	Belize	1 December 1981
76	Myanmar	15 July 1982
77	Singapore	6 August 1982
78	Barbados	20 August 1982
79	Thailand	20 August 1982
80	Nepal	15 February 1984
81	Bangladesh	5 June 1984
82	Cameroon	14 August 1984
83	Luxembourg	12 November 1985
84	Senegal	27 October 1987
85	Sudan	13 September 1988
86	Bahrain	27 April 1989
87	Angola	16 February 1989
88	Maldives	19 February 1989
89	Ghana	24 February 1989
90	Bahamas	1 May 1991
91	Lithuania	19 November 1992
92	Saint Kitts and Nevis	19 November 1992
93	Moldova	15 February 1993
94	Slovakia	15 February 1993
95	United Arab Emirates	9 March 1993
96	New Zealand	22 March 1993
97	Seychelles	21 May 1993
98	Ukraine	21 May 1993
99	Malaysia	24 July 1993
100	Jordan	7 February 1994
101	Oman	25 February 1994
102	Latvia	22 March 1994
103	Trinidad and Tobago	24 May 1994
104	South Africa	10 January 1995
105	Estonia	13 January 1995
106	Azerbaijan	6 April 1995
107	Slovenia	10 May 1995
108	Saint Lucia	10 July 1995
109	Kazakhstan	28 July 1995
110	Cambodia	15 February 1996
111	Brunei	28 March 1996
112	Papua New Guinea	3 May 1996
113	Croatia	12 July 1996
114	Andorra	16 July 1996
115	Antigua and Barbuda	27 September 1996
116	Armenia	7 August 1998
117	Belarus	22 October 1998
118	Georgia	18 November 1998
119	Iceland	4 June 1999
120	Nigeria	12 February 2001
121	Ireland	14 February 2001
122	Qatar	8 February 2002
123	North Macedonia	18 April 2002
124	Namibia	April 2002
125	Afghanistan	3 May 2002
126	San Marino	22 January 2004
127	Bosnia and Herzegovina	14 July 2004
128	Benin	20 September 2005
129	Saint Vincent and the Grenadines	17 July 2006
130	Tunisia	15 June 2007
131	Montenegro	9 May 2008
132	Botswana	15 December 2009
133	Djibouti	15 December 2009
134	Monaco	22 November 2010
135	Burkina Faso	29 July 2011
136	Liechtenstein	3 January 2012
137	Mongolia	17 January 2012
138	Dominica	13 March 2012
139	Palau	18 April 2012
140	Solomon Islands	11 September 2012
141	Fiji	9 November 2012
—	Kosovo	28 August 2013
142	Saudi Arabia	14 January 2015
143	Turkmenistan	24 July 2015
144	Ivory Coast	29 April 2016
145	China	12 June 2017
146	Tajikistan	26 May 2018
147	Togo	26 March 2019
148	Kenya	26 September 2019
149	Cape Verde	9 April 2021
150	Laos	9 September 2021
151	Kyrgyzstan	24 September 2021
152	Uzbekistan	29 November 2021
153	Timor-Leste	20 September 2022
154	Federated States of Micronesia	20 September 2022
155	Mauritania	22 September 2022
156	Rwanda	18 September 2023
157	Uganda	22 September 2023
158	Vanuatu	21 November 2023
159	Zimbabwe	28 December 2023
160	Kiribati	30 January 2024
—	Cook Islands	8 March 2024
161	Marshall Islands	23 September 2024
162	Zambia	24 September 2024
163	Somalia	20 January 2025

== Bilateral relations ==
Country	Formal Relations Began	Notes
Canada	11 August 1961	See Canada–Panama relations: Canada has an embassy in Panama City.; Panama has an embassy in Ottawa and consulates-general in Montreal, Toronto and Vancouver.
China	2 January 1909	See China–Panama relations and Panama–Taiwan relations. Panama established a diplomatic relationship with the Qing dynasty in 1909. After the Xinhai Revolution, Panama recognized the establishment of the Republic of China (ROC), and retained diplomatic ties with the ROC until 2017. According to diplomatic cables published by WikiLeaks, in 2009, after President Ricardo Martinelli took office, Panama wished to switch diplomatic relations from the ROC to the People's Republic of China (PRC). This was rejected by the PRC, which did not want to disrupt its improving diplomatic relations with the ROC during the ROC Presidency of Ma Ying-jeou. On June 12, 2017, President Juan Carlos Varela announced that Panama has established a diplomatic relationship with People's Republic of China, and Panama has severed diplomatic relationship with the Republic of China (Taiwan).
Chile	1 March 1908	Chile has an embassy in Panama City.; Panama has an embassy in Santiago and a consulate-general in Valparaíso.
Colombia	9 July 1924	See Colombia–Panama relations
Costa Rica	29 December 1903	See Costa Rica–Panama relations
India	1 June 1962	See India–Panama relations Panama is the first country in Central America where India established a resident embassy in 1973. Bilateral commercial and trade relations are steadily growing between India and Panama, with Panama seen as the gateway for expansion into Latin America.: India has an embassy in Panama City.; Panama has an embassy in New Delhi and a consulate-general in Mumbai.
Kosovo	27 August 2013	Panama officially recognised the independence of the Republic of Kosovo on 16 January 2009. Kosovo and Panama established diplomatic relations on 27 August 2013, following the establishment of diplomatic relations Kosovo announced it would be opening an embassy in Panama and that this embassy would be Kosovo's 'gateway to Latin America'. Kosovo has an embassy in Panama City.
Mexico	29 May 1923	See Mexico–Panama relations: Mexico has an embassy in Panama City.; Panama has an embassy in Mexico City and a consulate-general in Veracruz City.
Peru	2 March 1908	Main article: Panama–Peru relations
Russia	21 November 1903	See Panama–Russia relations: Panama has an embassy in Moscow.; Russia has an embassy in Panama city.
Sahrawi Arab Democratic Republic	1 June 1979-21 November 2024	See Panama–Sahrawi Arab Democratic Republic relations Panama was the first Latin American country on recognizing the SADR in 1978, during the military rule of Omar Torrijos. Panama also has the oldest Sahrawi embassy in Latin America. Relations were suspended from 20 November 2013 to 7 January 2016;. Diplomatic relations were suspended in November 2024.
Saint Vincent and the Grenadines	2006	Both countries established diplomatic relations on July 17, 2006.; Both countries are full members of the Organization of American States.
Serbia	1953	Both countries have established diplomatic relations in 1953.; A number of bilateral agreements have been concluded and are in force between both countries.
South Africa	1995	Both countries established diplomatic relations on 10 January 1995.; Panama has an embassy Pretoria.; South Africa is accredited to Panama from its embassy in Lima, Peru.
South Korea	30 September 1962	See Panama–South Korea relations: Panama has an embassy in Seoul.; South Korea has an embassy in Panama City.
Spain	10 May 1904	See Panama–Spain relations: Panama has an embassy in Madrid and consulates-general in A Coruña, Barcelona, Las Palmas and Valencia.; Spain has an embassy in Panama City.
Thailand	20 August 1982	Both countries established diplomatic relations on 20 August 1982.; Thailand is accredited to Panama from its embassy in Santiago, Chile.
Turkey	21 September 1950	See Panama–Turkey relations: Panama has an embassy in Ankara.; Turkey has an embassy in Panama.; Trade volume between the two countries was US$260.9 million in 2019 (Panamanian exports/imports: 12.1/248.8 million USD).
United Kingdom	9 April 1908	See Panama–United Kingdom relations Panamanian President Juan Carlos Varela with British Prime Minister Theresa May in 10 Downing Street, May 2018. The UK established diplomatic relations with the United Kingdom on 9 April 1908.: Panama maintains an embassy in London.; The United Kingdom is accredited to Panama from its embassy in Panama City.; Both countries share common membership of the United Nations, the World Health Organization, and the World Trade Organization, as well as the Central America–United Kingdom Association Agreement. Bilaterally the two countries have a Double Taxation Convention, and an Investment Agreement.
United States	13 November 1903; 3 April 1964	See Panama–United States relations: Panama has an embassy in Washington, D.C., and consulates-general in Houston, Los Angeles, Miami, New Orleans, New York City, Philadelphia and Tampa.; United States has an embassy in Panama City.
Uruguay	28 October 1904	See Panama–Uruguay relations
Venezuela	1717 Severed Relations in 2024	See Panama–Venezuela relations

== See also ==
- List of diplomatic missions in Panama
- List of diplomatic missions of Panama
