= Augusto Fábrega Donado =

Panamanian diplomat

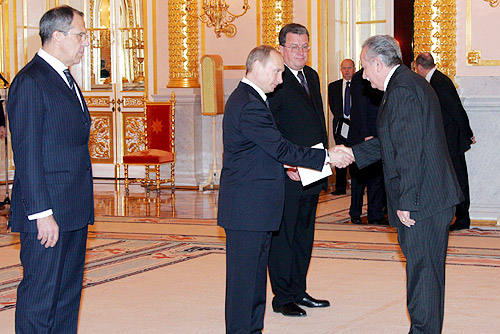
Fábrega Donado presents his credentials to Vladimir Putin in February 2006.

Augusto Aurelio Fábrega Donado (born 10 September 1940) is a retired Panamanian diplomat who formerly served as Panamanian Ambassador to Russia from 2005 to 2009.

== Biography ==
Fábrega Donado was born on 10 September 1940 in Aguadulce, Panama. After working as an elementary school teacher, he went to the Soviet Union to study, and graduated from the Peoples' Friendship University of Russia.

In 2006, he was chosen to serve as Panamanian Ambassador to Russia. He presented his credentials to Russian president Vladimir Putin on 3 February 2006.

In early 2014, through his efforts, a monument to Alexander Pushkin was installed near the University of Panama.

He worked as a translator between Spanish and Russian and authored several collections of poetry, some of which were published in Russian. He also published 37 scholarly works on various subjects. He serves on the Board of Trustees of the International Federation of Russian-Speaking Writers and acts as its official representative in the Republic of Panama.

In 2007, he received the Pushkin Medal from Russian president Vladimir Putin.

== See also ==
- Panama–Russia relations
