= Panama–Taiwan relations =

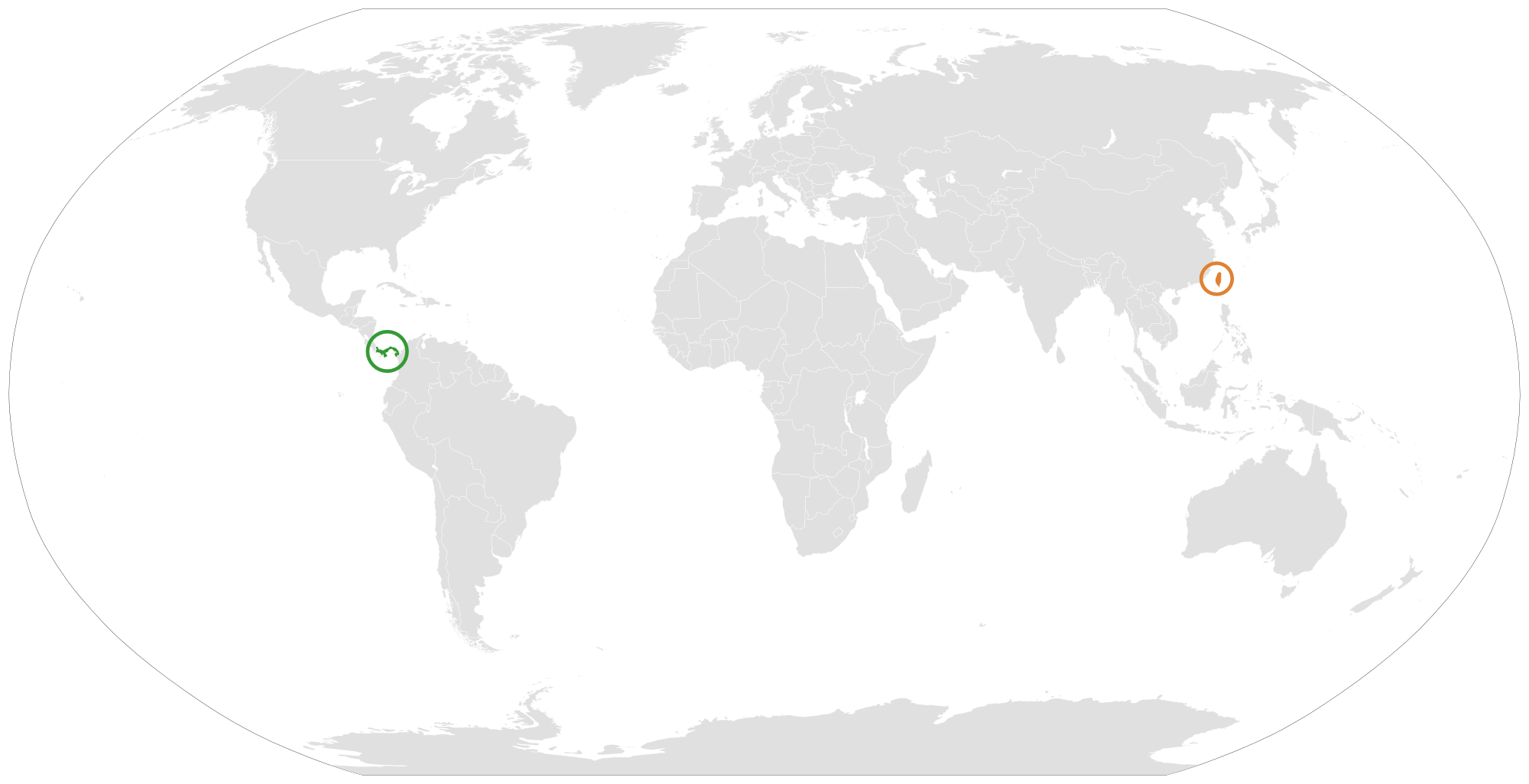
- Panama: Taiwan

Panama was once an important source of diplomatic support for Taiwan. In June 2017, it broke off relations with Taiwan and established diplomatic relations with the People's Republic of China.

== History ==
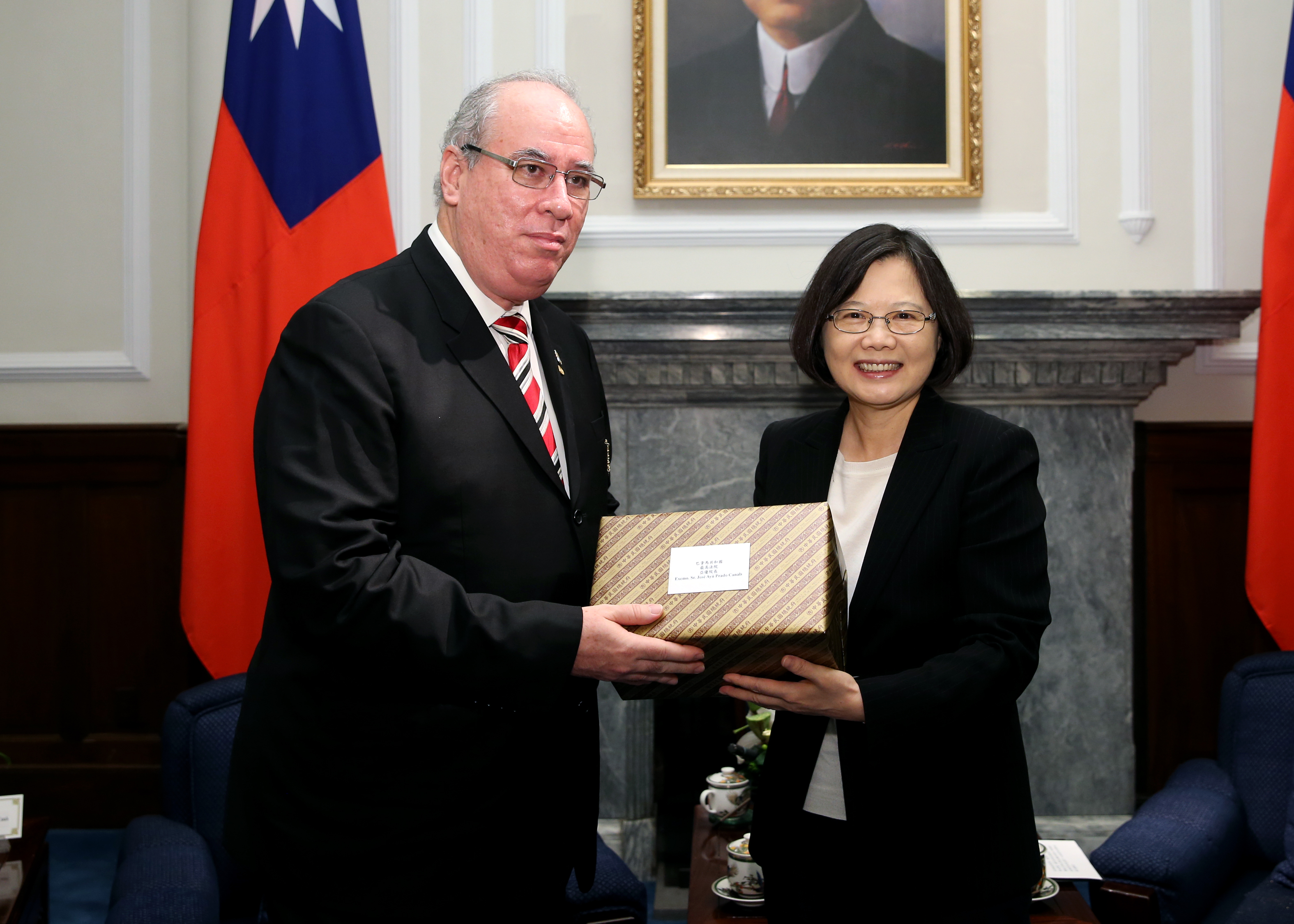
President Tsai Ing-wen with José Ayú Prado Canals, president of the Supreme Court of Panama in 2016

Panama was an important source of diplomatic support for the Republic of China (ROC) for 106 years.

According to diplomatic cables published by WikiLeaks, in 2009, after President Ricardo Martinelli took office, Panama wished to switch diplomatic relations from the ROC to the People's Republic of China (PRC). This was rejected by the PRC, which did not want to disrupt its improving relations with the ROC during the presidency of Ma Ying-jeou.

On 13 June 2017, Panama and the People's Republic of China issued a joint declaration of establishing diplomatic relations with each other. Simultaneously, Panama severed official relations and official contacts with Taiwan. In 2019, newspaper La Prensa reported that China does not allow Panama to host a Taipei Economic and Cultural Representative Office, thus preventing Panama from holding unofficial ties with Taiwan via a de facto embassy. The same was attempted by China in the Dominican Republic but was unsuccessful.

== See also ==
- Foreign relations of Panama
- Foreign relations of Taiwan
