= Mexicans in Panama =

Mexican Panamanian Mexicano panameño
Total population
- 6,652 (2022)

Regions with significant populations
- Panama City, David, Colón and Penonomé.

Languages
- Mexican Spanish, Panamanian Spanish, and a minority of Indigenous Mexican Languages.

Religion
- Predominantly Roman Catholicism.

Related ethnic groups
- Mexicans

Mexicans in Panama, or Mexican Panamanians are people born in Mexico who live in Panama, or people who were born in Panama but who are or were of Mexican descent.

== Mexican culture in Panama ==
Carlos Fuentes was born of Mexican parents in Panama, on November 11, 1928 and died aged 83 in Mexico City, on May 15, 2012. His father was a diplomat, and he spent his childhood in various capitals of Latin America: Montevideo, Rio de Janeiro, Washington, D.C., Santiago, Quito and Buenos Aires, the city where his father comes in 1934 as a counselor of the Embassy of Mexico. He passes his summers in Mexico City, studying in schools to keep his language and learn the history of his country. He lived in Santiago de Chile (1941–1943) and Buenos Aires where he was influenced by notable personalities in American cultural sphere.

Legendary Panamanian boxer Roberto Durán is also of Mexican descent; his father, Margarito Durán, being a Mexican-American soldier from Arizona, United States.

Mexican drug cartels such as the Sinaloa Cartel operated in Panama since the 1980s.

== See also ==
- Emigration from Mexico
- Mexico–Panama relations
