= Panama–South Korea relations =

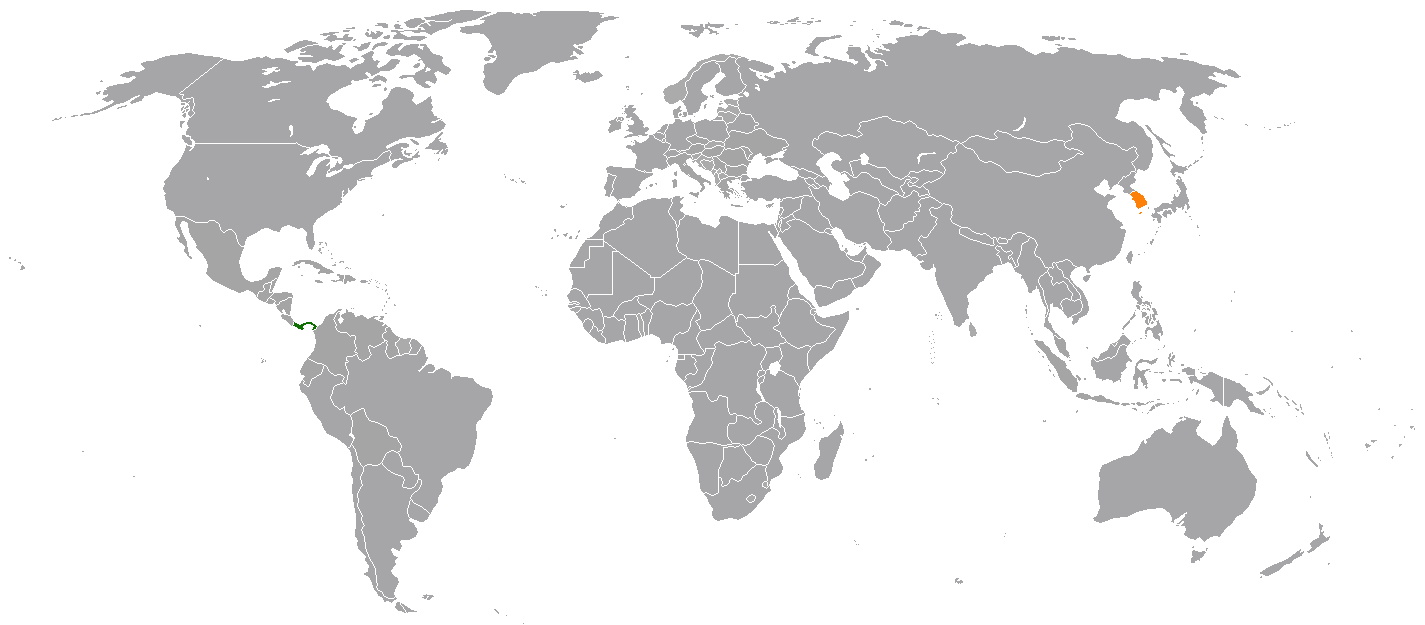
- Panama: South Korea

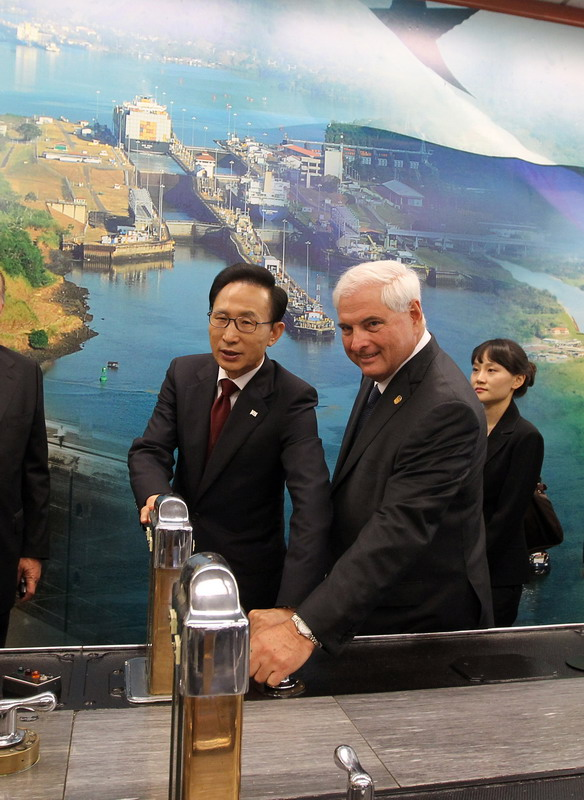
President Lee Myung-bak (l) and President Ricardo Martinelli (r) during their visit to the Panama Canal locks in Panama City, June 2010.

Panama–South Korea relations are bilateral relations between Panama and South Korea, which were established in 1962. Panama has an embassy in Seoul. South Korea has an embassy in Panama City.

Both countries are members of the United Nations.

The Panama-Korea Association was established in 2012 with the purpose of promoting and strengthening commercial, academic, cultural and friendship links between both countries.

== High level visits ==
In June 2010, South Korean President Lee Myung-bak visited Panama. Later, in October, he received his Panamanian counterpart Ricardo Martinelli at Cheong Wa Dae for summit talks.

== Trade ==
In 2021, Panama's exports to South Korea amounted to $380 million. South Korea is the third largest export partner of Panama.

== Resident diplomatic missions ==
- Panama has an embassy in Seoul.
- South Korea has an embassy in Panama City.

== See also ==
- Foreign relations of Panama
- Foreign relations of South Korea
  - Indo-Pacific Strategy of South Korea
