= Canada–Panama relations =

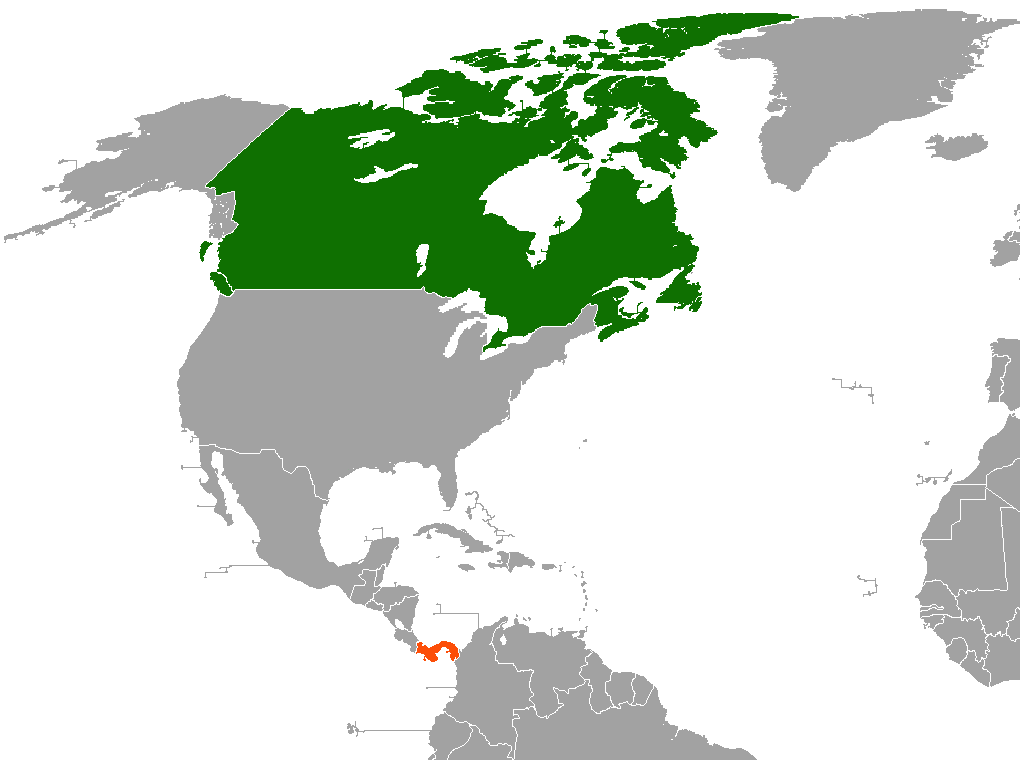

- Canada: Panama

Canada and Panama established diplomatic relations in 1961. Both countries are full members of the Organization of American States.

In 2008, Canada and Panama made an air transport agreement. This agreement put into place a new, modern framework for scheduled air services between Canada and Panama. This agreement is responsible for increase tourism since 2008, between Canada and Panama.

In August 2009, Canadian prime minister Stephen Harper and Panamanian president Ricardo Martinelli signed a bilateral free trade agreement known as the Canada–Panama Free Trade Agreement. It was formally ratified by the Parliament of Canada three years later and entered into force on April 1, 2013. In 2010, 2011 and 2012, the total yearly trade between the two countries was estimated to be between 200M$ and 250M$.

== Resident diplomatic missions ==
- Canada has an embassy in Panama City. Prior to that date, the resident Canadian ambassador in Costa Rica has concurrent accreditation in Panama.
- Panama has an embassy in Ottawa and consulates-general in Montreal, Toronto and Vancouver.

== See also ==
- Foreign relations of Canada
- Foreign relations of Panama
