= Panama–Turkey relations =

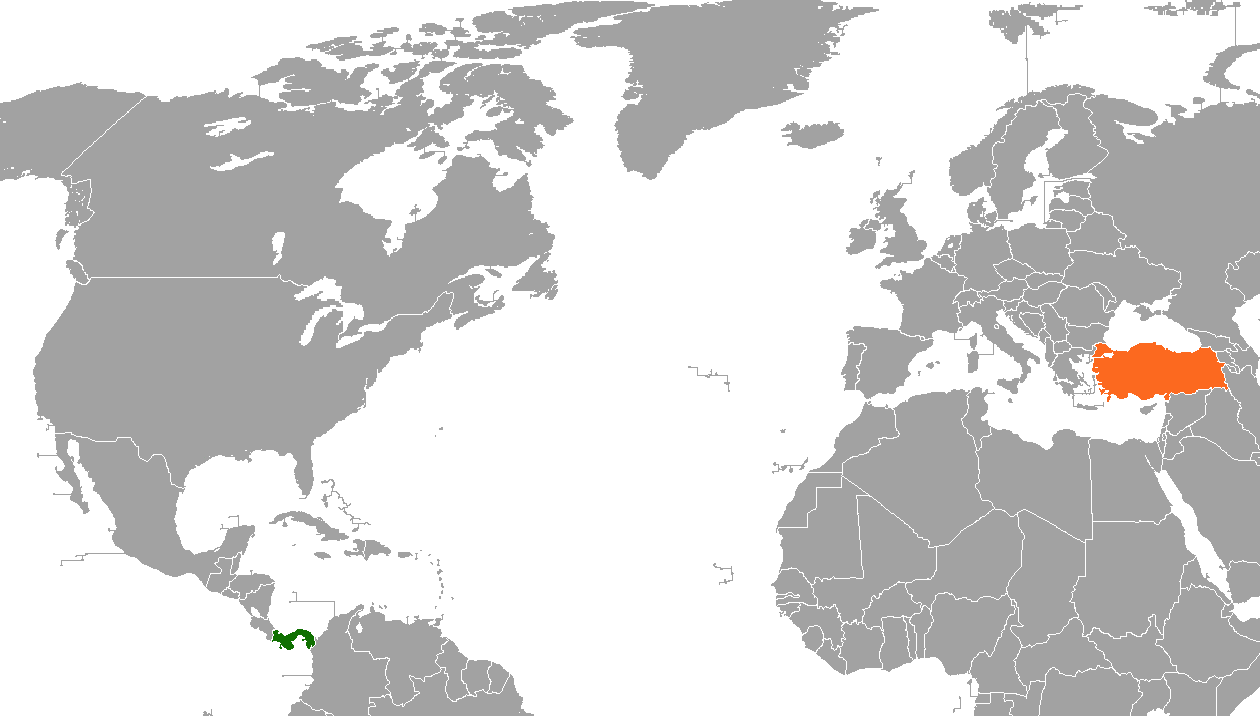
- Panama: Turkey

Panama–Turkey relations are foreign relations between Panama and Turkey. Panama has an embassy in Ankara and a consulate general in Istanbul since 2015. Turkey has an embassy in Panama City since March 1, 2014.

== Official visits ==
Guest	Host	Place of visit	Date of visit
(Panama) Deputy Foreign Minister Maria Luisa Navarro	(Turkey) Minister of Foreign Affairs Mevlüt Çavuşoğlu	Second Turkey-SICA Foreign Ministers Forum, Istanbul	April 20, 2017

== Economic relations ==
- Trade volume between the two countries was US$260.9 million in 2018 (Turkish exports/imports: US$248.8/12.1 million).

== Resident diplomatic missions ==
- Panama has an embassy in Ankara.
- Turkey has an embassy in Panama City.
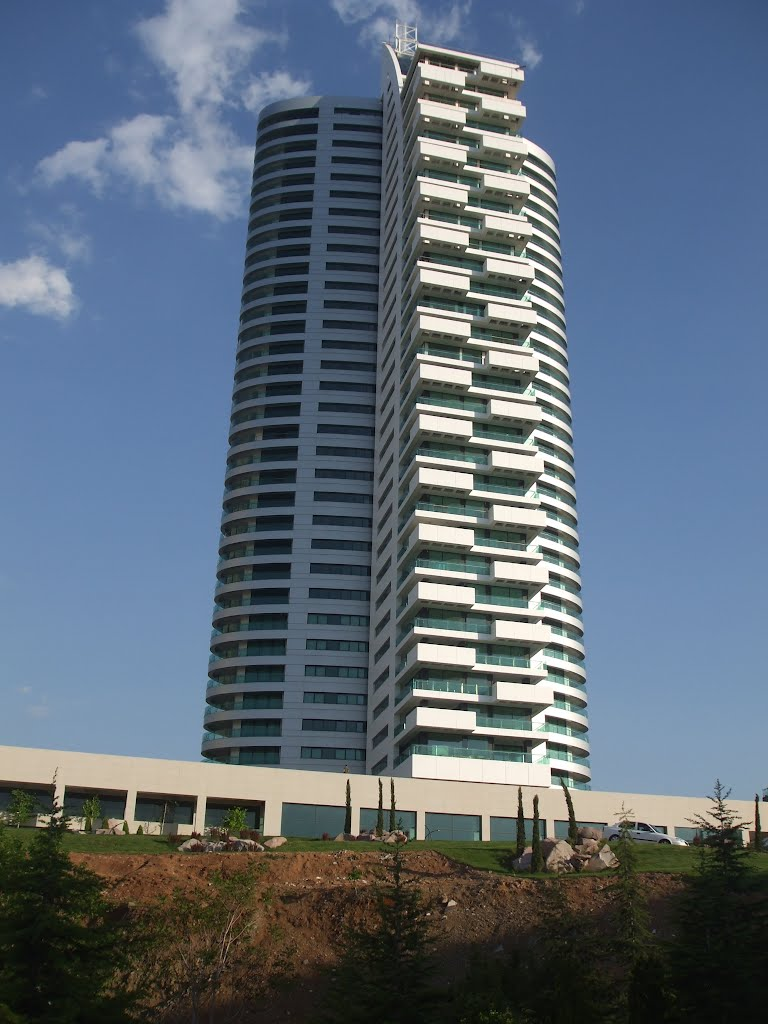
Çiçeği Residence hosting the Embassy of Panama in Ankara

== See also ==
- Foreign relations of Panama
- Foreign relations of Turkey
