= China–Panama relations =

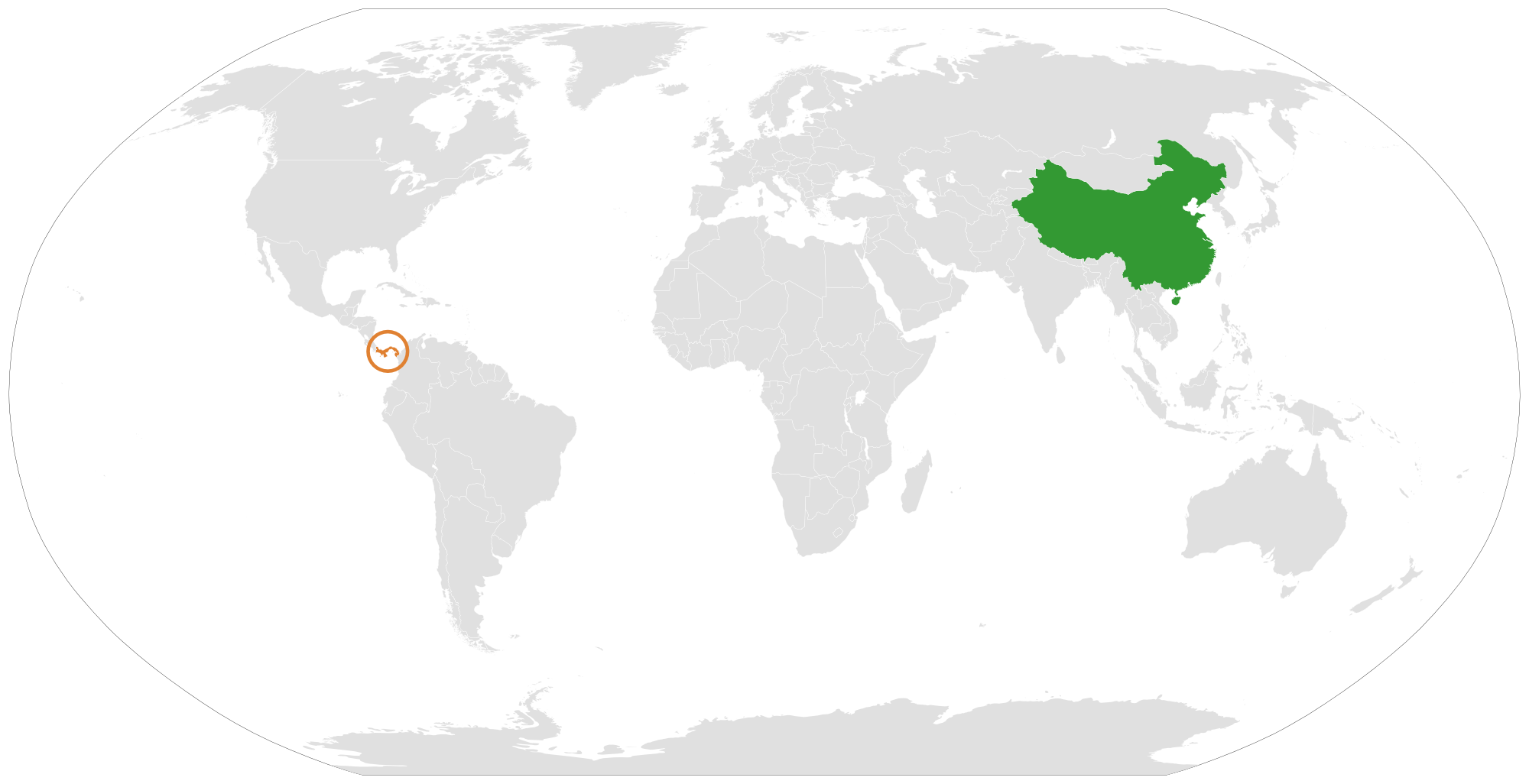
- China: Panama

Diplomatic relations between the People's Republic of China (PRC) and Panama were established in June 2017. Panama had previously recognized Taiwan. Relations began to cool in 2025 when Panama announced that it would exit the Belt and Road Initiative. Relations further deteriorated in 2026 when Panama's supreme court ruled that CK Hutchison's concession at two ports in the Panama Canal was unconstitutional, prompting retaliatory measures from Beijing.

== History ==
=== Before the Second World War ===
Relations between Panama (then still a part of Colombia) and Imperial China began in the mid-1800s with the arrival of Chinese 'coolies' to the country. These Chinese immigrants faced widespread discrimination even after Panama gained independence from Colombia in 1903. In 1909, the new Panamanian government stopped the use of citizenship cards, which allowed families of Chinese workers to settle in Panama. Responding to calls from a Deputy in the National Assembly, Modesto Justiniani, in 1912, President Belisario Porras issued Executive Decree No. 2 which required all Chinese immigrants to deposit a sum of 250 balboas as a guarantee that they would leave as soon as their worker's contract expired. By 1926, Panama had banned any kind of Chinese immigration, and by 1932 had banned immigration from any non-Spanish speaking country. After the Second World War, Panama joined several other countries, including the US, and refrained from recognizing the People's Republic of China, establishing ties with the government-in-exile in Taiwan instead.

=== The Cold War period and the 1990s ===
Panama refused to acknowledge the existence of the People's Republic of China even in 1972, when the US did so, believing that Taiwanese cooperation would reap benefits. The 1977 Treaty Concerning Permanent Neutrality and Operation of the Panama Canal (the first of the Torrijos-Carter Treaties which gave Panama control over the Canal in 1999), which guaranteed neutrality in the Panama Canal was signed by all UNSC members, with the notable absence of China. This did not stop Chinese immigration into the country, which continued in the 1990s. Both countries established offices of commercial development in the others' capital city in September 1995, however, Panama continued to recognize Taiwan. In 1999, Panama gained full control over the Canal.

== Bilateral relations ==
=== Establishment of diplomatic relations ===
While Panama had long recognized and maintained diplomatic ties with Taiwan, or the Republic of China (ROC), President Martín Torrijos had tried to normalize relations with Beijing during his tenure between 2004 and 2009. Torrijos was not very supportive of Panama-Taiwan relations, and even refused to host Taiwanese President Chen Shui-Bian during his 2005 visit of Latin America and the Caribbean. His successor, Ricardo Martinelli, also attempted to establish diplomatic ties with Beijing for economic gains in 2009, offering to cease recognition of Taiwan, but China showed no interest.

The first ship to cross the newly expanded Panama Canal in 2016 was owned by a Chinese company, COSCO. On June 13, 2017, Panama announced that it would no longer be recognizing Taiwan and established diplomatic ties with China. In a statement after the announcement, Taiwan expressed "strong protest and condemnation", accusing China of luring Panama and infringing on their diplomatic space. The Panamanian Vice President at the time, Isabel de Sant Malo, indicated that the move would increase exports to China, tourism and investment. Chinese Foreign Minister Wang Yi welcomed the decision as one that was in accordance to the times and in the Panamanian people's best interests. General secretary to the Taiwan Presidential Office, Joseph Wu, stated in 2018 that it was “unfair act, which China has made possible through intimidation diplomacy, offerings and the purchase of diplomatic allies”. The Taiwanese Ministry of Foreign Affairs accused Panamanian President Juan Carlos Varela (2014–19) of ignoring the long diplomatic relationship that had mutually economically benefitted both countries. Immediately, Taiwan withdrew from all bilateral cooperation projects with Panama and removed all diplomatic staff from the country, stating that it refused to be in competition with China over influence in the Panama Canal. Taipei also claimed that it had not seen this coming, and that in the months prior, Panama had made no indication of a termination of diplomatic recognition.

In 2018, the first flight from Beijing To Panama by Air China landed in Tocumen International Airport, with a technical stop in Houston. Varela called it a milestone in Panamanian aviation. Due to this new route, the Panamanian Ministry of Tourism expected at least 40,000 Chinese tourist visits per year. As a result, Panama City was almost immediately added to China's list of officially approved tourist destinations.

On December 2, Chinese leader and general secretary of the Chinese Communist Party Xi Jinping visited Panama as part of a four-country tour, going first to Spain, then to Argentina for the 2018 G20 Buenos Aires summit, then to Panama and then to Portugal before returning to China. On the same trip, Xi, the first Chinese leader to be invited to Panama, signed 19 deals with Varela on trade, tourism, judicial cooperation and infrastructure. Talks began on a free trade agreement (FTA), although Panama kept its FTA with Taiwan intact. Panama also became the first Latin American country to join the Belt and Road Initiative.

In 2019, newspaper La Prensa, reported that China does not allow Panama to host a Taipei Economic and Cultural Representative Office, thus preventing Panama from holding unofficial ties with Taiwan. The same was attempted by China in the Dominican Republic but was unsuccessful.

=== 2020s ===
Hong Kong-based company CK Hutchison won a 25-year concession from the Panamanian government in 1997 to pursue infrastructure projects and largely control in two significant ports: Balboa and Cristóbal. This contract was renewed in 2021 for another 25 years. This has greatly alarmed the US of increasing Chinese presence over the Canal - a strategically placed port for American trade - and has led them to accuse Panama of being swayed by the Chinese government, an accusation that has been dismissed by the Panamanian government.

As March 2025, Panama has received $669 billion of financing from China from the time diplomatic relations began. On March 4, 2025, in a deal valued at $23 billion, Hutchison sold its shares to US company BlackRock. This came after US Secretary of State Marco Rubio's visit in February 2025, when Panama announced that it would not renew its Belt and Road Initiative membership upon expiration.

In November 2025, the PRC protested a trip by Panamanian lawmakers to Taiwan. In January 2026, the Supreme Court of Panama ruled that CK Hutchinson's concession was unconstitutional. The Hong Kong and Macao Affairs Office called the court's decision "shameful and pathetic" and threatened Panama with a "heavy price" in response. A CK Hutchinson subsidiary subsequently commenced arbitration proceedings against Panama in the International Chamber of Commerce. In February 2026, the Panama Maritime Authority took control over the two ports and granted temporary operating licenses to Maersk and Mediterranean Shipping Company. China began detaining Panama-flagged vessels at Chinese ports in response, according to the Federal Maritime Commission. Customs inspections of Panamanian coffee and bananas entering China increased. In April 2026, multiple countries jointly condemned China's economic pressure campaign on Panama. In November 2026, Panama filed a criminal complaint regarding the prior port concession contract with CK Hutchinson.

== Resident diplomatic missions ==
of China in Panama

- Panama City (Embassy)

of Panama in China

- Beijing (Embassy)
- Guangzhou (Consulate-General)
- Hong Kong (Consulate-General)
- Shanghai (Consulate-General)

== See also ==
- Foreign relations of China
- Foreign relations of Panama
