= Panama–Spain relations =

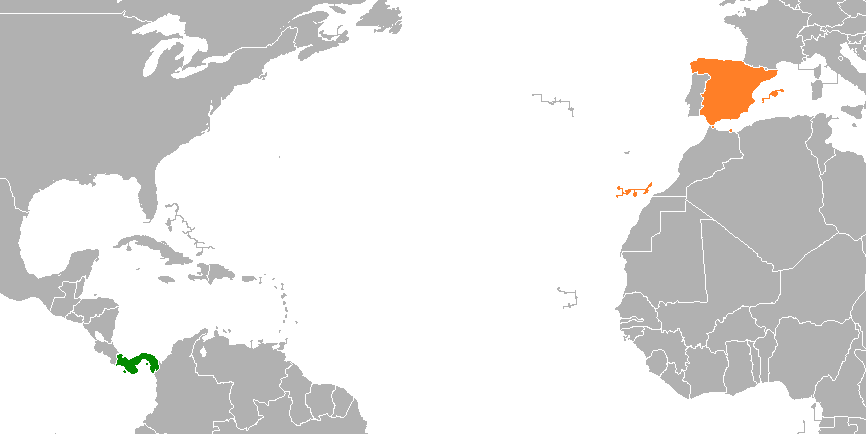
- Panama: Spain

Diplomatic mission
- Embassy of Panama, Madrid: Embassy of Spain, Panama City

Panama and Spain maintain diplomatic relations. Both nations are members of the Association of Academies of the Spanish Language and the Organization of Ibero-American States.

== History ==
=== Spanish colonization ===
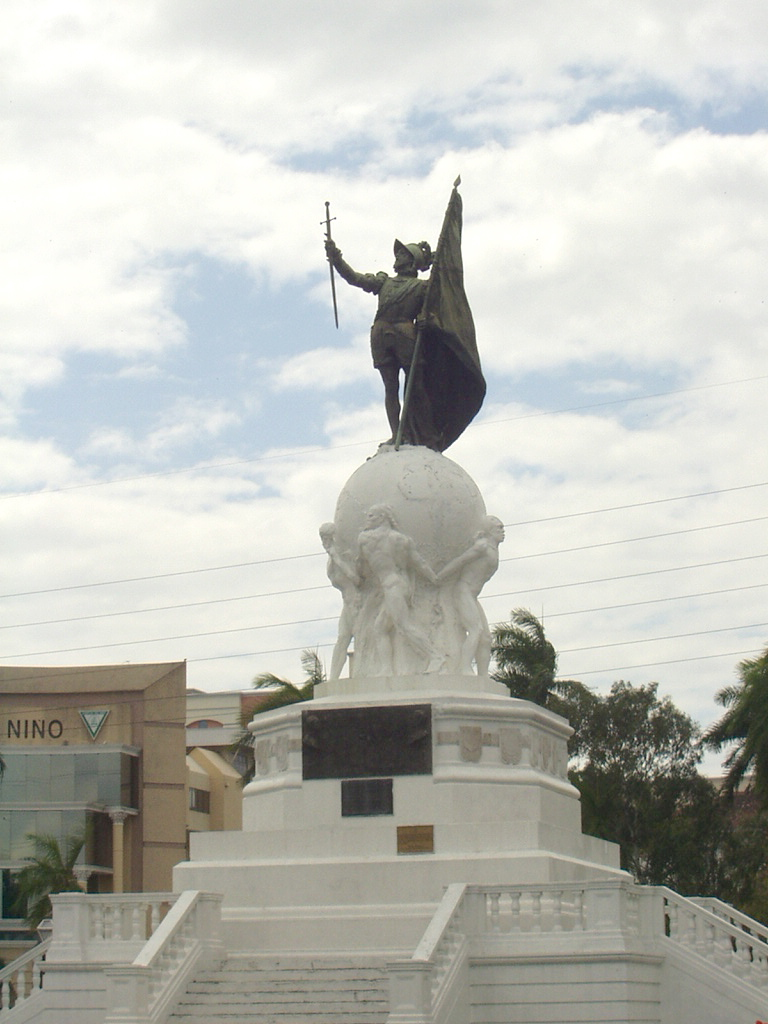
Statue of Vasco Núñez de Balboa in Panama City

In 1501, Spanish explorer Rodrigo de Bastidas became the first European to enter the territory of Panama and claimed it for Spain. In 1502, Christopher Columbus sailed along the shores of Panama. In 1510, Spanish explorer Diego de Nicuesa founded the first settlement in Panama and named it Nombre de Dios. In September 1513, Spanish conquistador Vasco Núñez de Balboa arrived to Panama and became the first European to lead an expedition to have seen the Pacific Ocean. In 1513, Panama officially became part of the Spanish Empire.

In 1514, Pedro Arias Dávila became the first governor of the territory of Panama. Governor Arias Dávila founded the city of Panama City which he made into the capital of the territory. Once in power, he ordered the beheading of Balboa in 1517 on a charge of treason. Governor Arias Dávila also ordered murderous attacks against the indigenous population, whom he roasted alive and/or fed to dogs. During this period, Panama became an important territory for Spain as it is situated between the Spanish territories of New Spain and the territories of South America. In 1717, Panama became part of the Viceroyalty of New Granada.

=== Independence ===
In 1808, Joseph Bonaparte was installed as King of Spain and several Spanish American colonies began to declare their independence from Spain. From 10 – 28 November 1821, residents of Panama led a bloodless revolt against Spain and declared its independence on 28 November 1821. With the approval of Simón Bolívar, Panama joined the union of Gran Colombia which included Colombia, Ecuador and Venezuela.

In 1831, the union collapsed and Panama remained joined to Colombia until 1903 when the Senate of Colombia refused to ratify the Hay–Herrán Treaty which would have allowed the United States to lease the Panama Canal for 100 years. The United States soon supported the independence of Panama for which Spain recognized in 1903.

=== Post-Independence ===
In May 1904, Panama and Spain officially established diplomatic relations. In 1915, Spain completed the construction of an embassy in Panama City. During the Spanish Civil War (1936-1939) several Spaniards immigrated to Panama seeking refuge. In September 1977, King Juan Carlos I of Spain paid an official visit to Panama, the first of three visits.

From 1983 to 1989, Manuel Noriega ruled Panama. During the United States invasion of Panama, Noriega fled to the Vatican's Apostolic Nunciature in Panama. While there, Noriega asked the Spanish government for refugee in Spain. Spain refused Noriega's offer as Spain had a standing extradition treaty with the United States.

On 31 December 1999, Spanish King Juan Carlos I traveled to Panama and met with Panamanian President Mireya Moscoso and assisted the transition of the Panama Canal to Panamanian control. In July 2014, Spanish Prime Minister Mariano Rajoy paid an official visit to Panama. In September 2014, Panamanian President Juan Carlos Varela paid an official visit to Spain.

== High-level visits ==
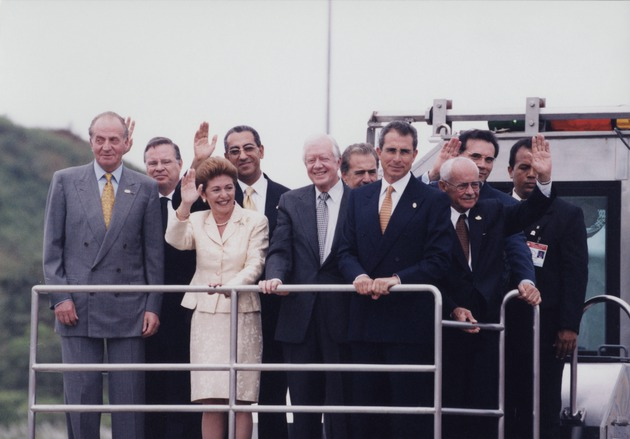
King Juan Carlos I of Spain with Panamanian President Mireya Moscoso during the hand-over of the canal to Panamanian control on 31 December 1999.

Presidential visits from Panama to Spain

- President Arístides Royo (1979)
- President Nicolás Ardito Barletta (1984)
- President Guillermo Endara (1992)
- President Ernesto Pérez Balladares (1998)
- President Mireya Moscoso (2000, 2002)
- President Martín Torrijos (2005, 2007, 2008)
- President Ricardo Martinelli (2012, 2014)
- President Juan Carlos Varela (2014)
- President José Raúl Mulino (2025)

Royal and Prime Ministerial visits from Spain to Panama

- King Juan Carlos I (1977, 1999, 2000)
- Prime Minister Felipe González (1983)
- Prime Minister José María Aznar (2000)
- Prime Minister Mariano Rajoy (2013, 2014)
- King Felipe VI (2019, 2024)

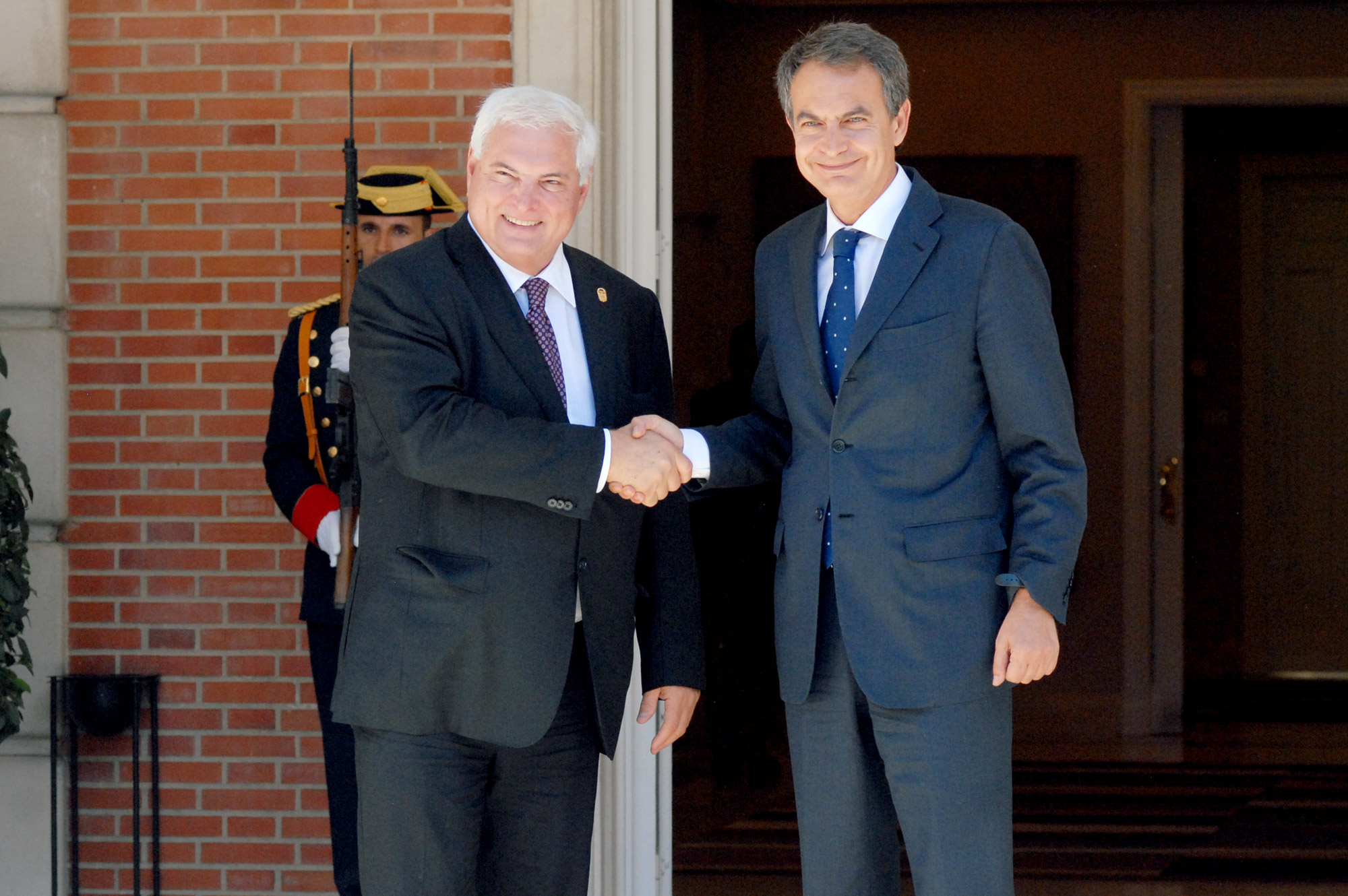
Prime Minister José Luis Rodríguez Zapatero and President Ricardo Martinelli in Madrid; 2011.

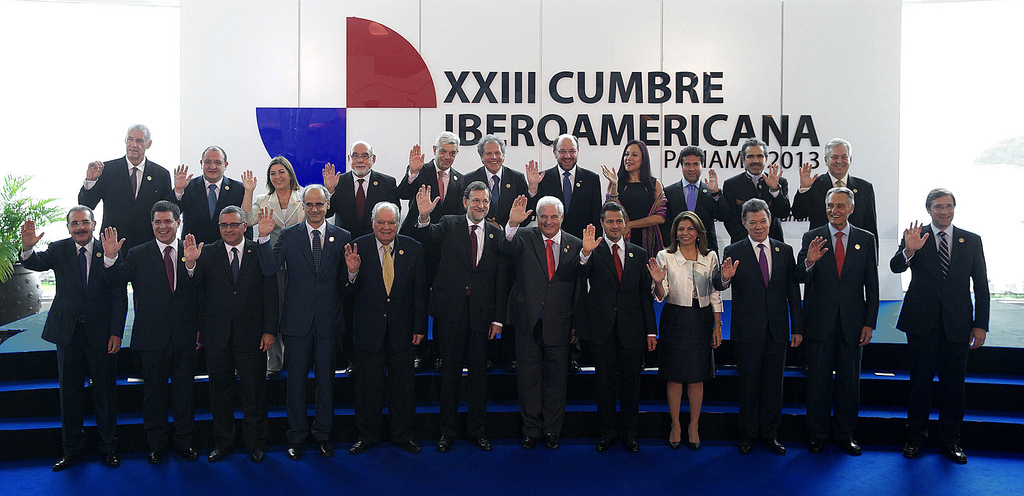
President Ricardo Martinelli and Prime Minister Mariano Rajoy in Panama City; October 2013.

== Bilateral relations ==
Both nations have signed several bilateral agreements such as a Treaty of Peace and Friendship (1953); Agreement on Social Cooperation (1966); Agreement on Cultural Cooperation (1979); Agreement on Economic and Trade Cooperation (1982); Agreement on Scientific and Technical Cooperation (1983); Agreement on the reciprocal Promotion and Protection of Investments (1997); Extradition Treaty (1997); Air Transportation Agreement (2001) and an Agreement between the Ministries of Health of Panama and Spain for the formation of Health Personnel.

== Transportation ==
There are direct flights between Panama and Spain with Air Europa and Iberia airlines.

== Trade ==
In 2024, trade between Panama and Spain totaled €232 million Euros. Panama's main exports to Spain include: frozen tuna and lobster and palm oil. Spain's main exports to Panama include: perfume, medications, steel and iron for construction purposes, automobile and trams, electrical wiring and ceramic coverings. In 2016, Spanish investments in Panama totaled €14 million Euros, with most of the investments going into the food and paper industries. Spanish multinational companies such as Mapfre, Telefónica and Zara operate in Panama.

== Resident diplomatic missions ==
of Panama in Spain

- Madrid (Embassy)
- A Coruña (Consulate-General)
- Barcelona (Consulate-General)
- Las Palmas (Consulate-General)
- Valencia (Consulate-General)

of Spain in Panama

- Panama City (Embassy)

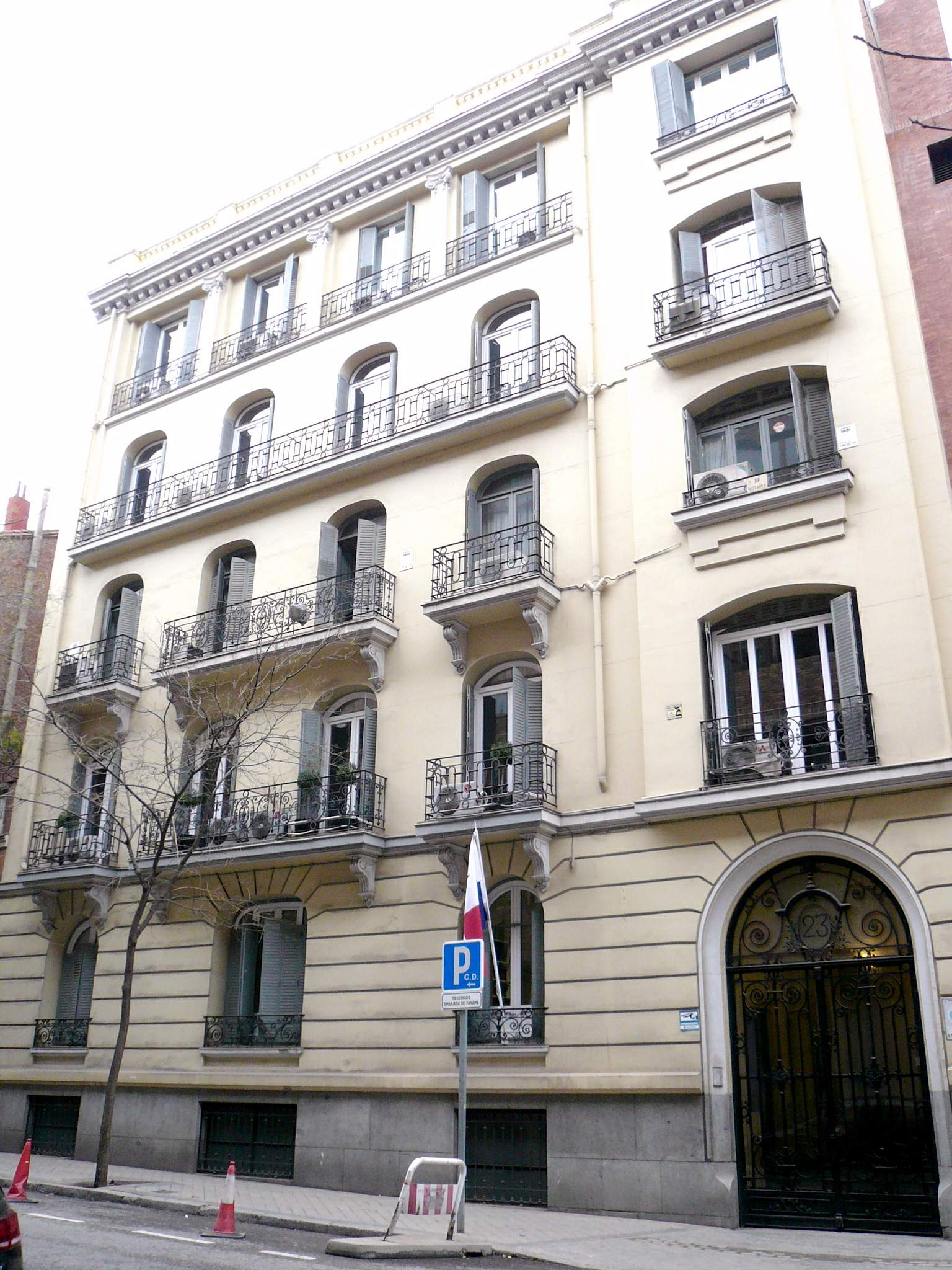
Embassy of Panama in Madrid

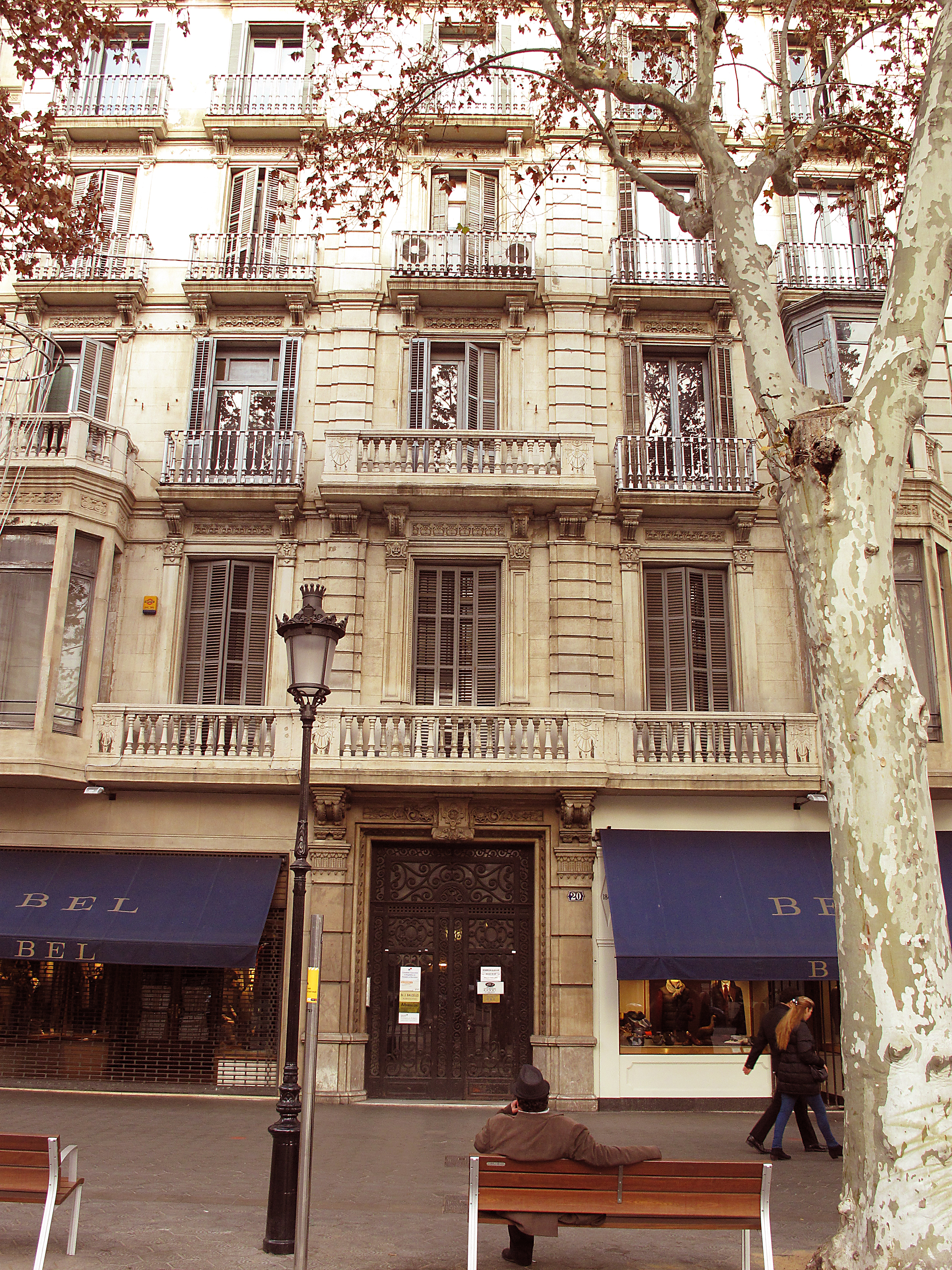
Consulate-General of Panama in Barcelona

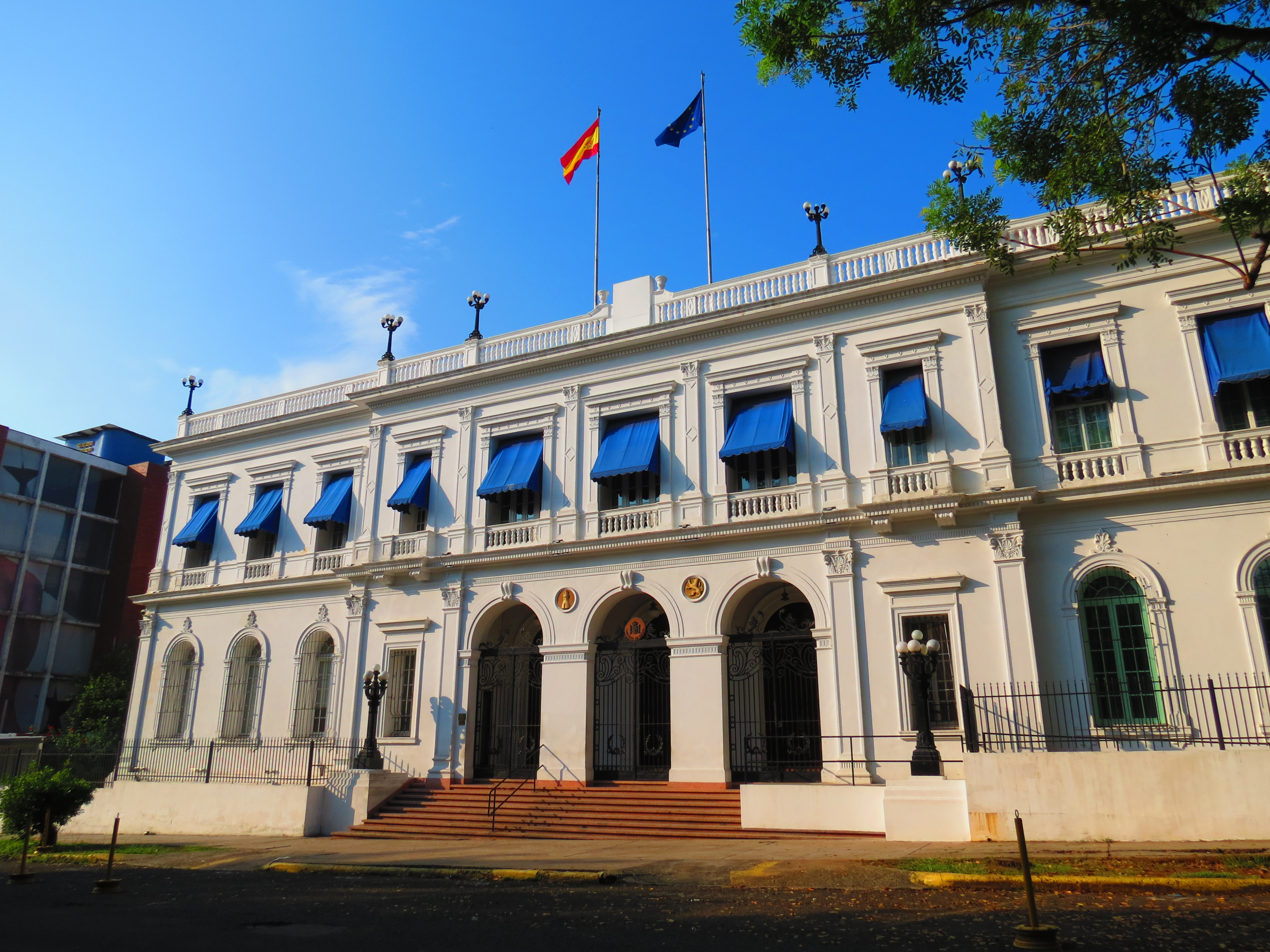
Embassy of Spain in Panama City

== See also ==
- Foreign relations of Panama
- Foreign relations of Spain
- Panamanian Spanish
