= Francisco Vicente de la Espriella =

Francisco Vicente de la Espriella Navarro (birth: April 5, 1844, death: April 22, 1916 in Panama City) was a Panamanian lawyer, merchant, and politician. De la Espriella Navarro was the first Minister of Foreign Affairs for the Republic of Panama.

== Biography ==
Francisco Vicente de la Espriella Navarro was born on April 5, 1844 to José Francisco de la Espriella Díaz and Candelaria Navarro del Real. His family originated from the Spanish region Asturias. De la Espriella Navarro lived in Cartagena, Nueva Granada, and practiced law in the city, but later moved to Panama. De la Espriella Navarro married Constancia Macaya Artuz in 1872.

The couple had seven children. The first son died shortly after birth. The other children were María Candelaria de la Espriella Macaya, Constancia de la Espriella Macaya, Cristina de la Espriella Macaya, Francisco Eduardo de la Espriella Macaya, Catalina de la Espriella Macaya and Josefina de la Espriella Macaya.

When Panama was separated from Colombia, de la Espriella Navarro was put in charge of the foreign relations of the Provisional Government Junta for the new state.

The properties of de la Espriella Navarro in Costa Rica amounted to a value of 109,659 colones and 74 céntimos at the time of his deaths. His widow inherited the property, and settled down in San José. His son, Francisco Eduardo de la Espriella Macaya, became the Panamanian ambassador to Costa Rica.

Francisco Vicente de la Espriella Navarro is the great grandfather of Costa Rican Social Christian Unity Party politician Abel Pacheco de la Espriella (President of Costa Rica 2002-2006).
