= Panama–Russia relations =

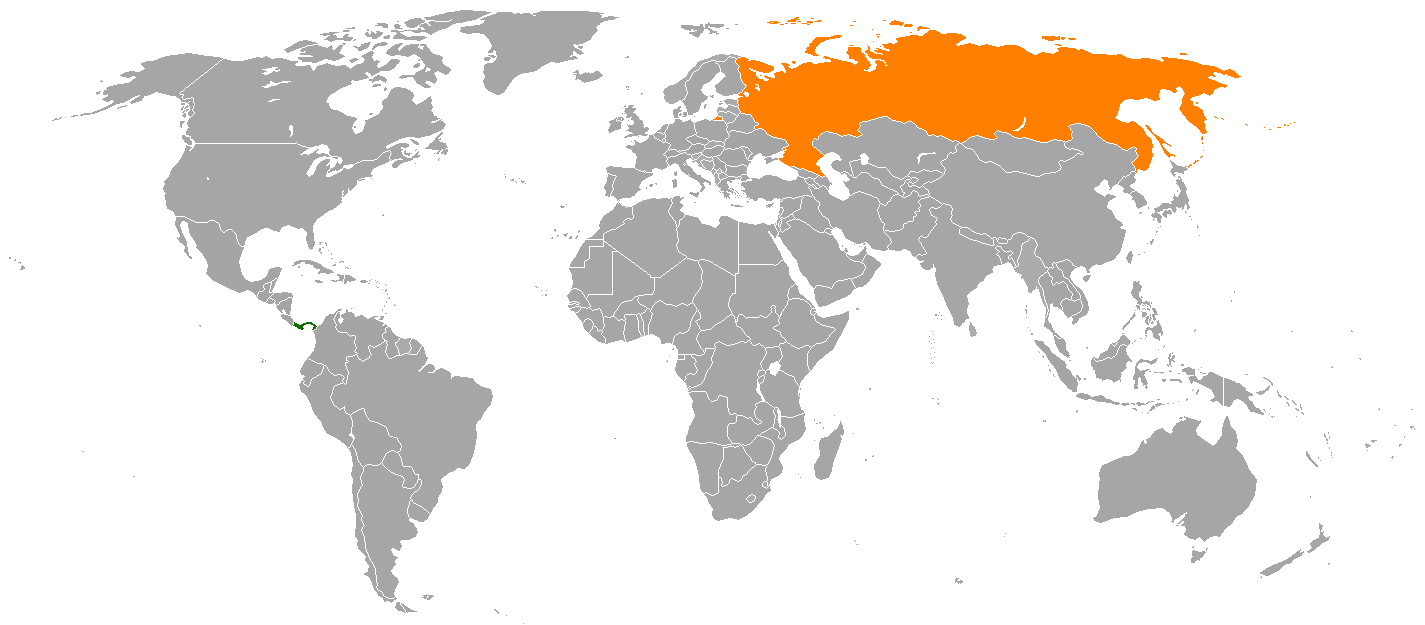
- Panama: Russia

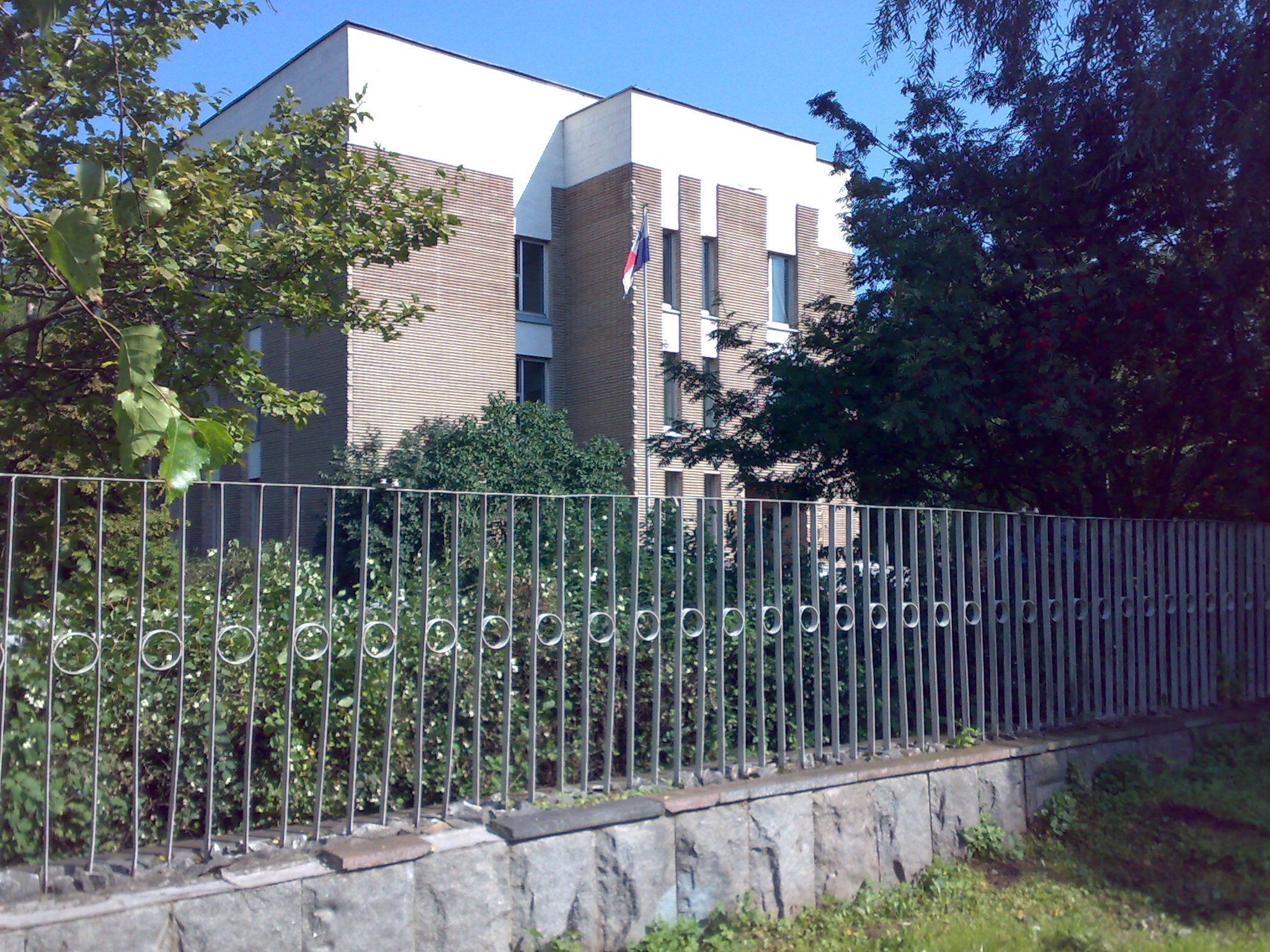
Embassy of Panama in Moscow

Panama–Russia relations are the bilateral relationships between Panama and Russia. Panama has an embassy in Moscow. Russia has an embassy in Panama. Both countries are full members of the United Nations.

According to Russia's Ministry of Foreign Affairs, about 1,000 Russian citizens live in Panama (both permanently and temporarily).

== History ==
During the Cold War era, there was a significant amount of contact between the USSR and the People's Party of Panama.

In November 1988, the USSR joined the 1977 Protocol on the neutrality of the Panama Canal, becoming the 36th signatory to the agreement.

Diplomatic relations between Russia and Panama were established on March 29, 1991.

== See also ==
- Foreign relations of Panama
- Foreign relations of Russia
- List of ambassadors of Russia to Panama
