= Mexico–Panama relations =

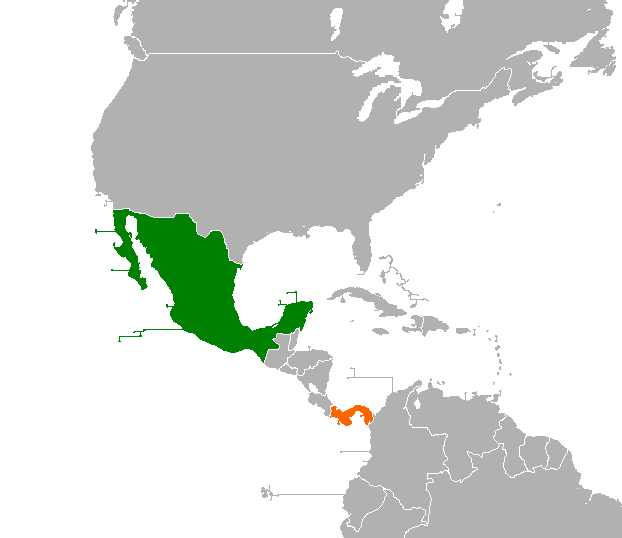

- Mexico: Panama

The nations of Mexico and Panama established diplomatic relations in 1904. Both nations are mutual members of the Association of Caribbean States, Community of Latin American and Caribbean States, Latin American Integration Association, Organization of Ibero-American States and the Organization of American States.

== History ==
Mexico and Panama share a common history in the fact that both nations were colonized by the Spanish Empire. In 1821, both nations obtained independence from Spain and Panama became part of the Gran Colombia. In 1831, the Gran Colombia dissolved into three separate nations (Colombia, Ecuador and Venezuela) with Panama remaining part of Colombia.

In 1856, Mexico opened a consular office in Panama City which was under the administration of the Mexican Legation in Bogotá. In 1899, Colombia and Panama were involved in an internal political war known as the Thousand Days' War which lasted until 1902. The United States took advantage of the war to build a canal in Panama and when Colombia refused to ratify the Hay–Herrán Treaty; the United States sponsored a rebellion for the separation of Panama from Colombia. On 3 November 1903 Panama became an independent nation. Mexico and Panama established diplomatic relations on 1 March 1904.

In 1956, Mexican President Adolfo Ruiz Cortines paid a visit to Panama, the first by a Mexican head-of-state. In 1969, Panamanian President Omar Torrijos paid a visit to Mexico. There would be several high-level visits between leaders of both nations.

During the 1970s, Mexico became a vocal supporter for dialogue between Panama and the United States for eventual Panamanian control of the Panama Canal. In 1977, Panama and the United States signed the Torrijos–Carter Treaties giving Panama eventual control of the canal in December 1999. During the 1980s, foreign ministers of Colombia, Mexico, Panama and Venezuela created the Contadora Group in order to diplomatically try to resolve the crisis facing many Central American nations at the time.

In 1989, Mexico and Panama withdrew their respective ambassadors after the accusations from the United States and international community that the former Panamanian President Manuel Noriega was involved in money laundering and was not democratically elected. In December 1989, the United States invaded Panama and removed Noriega from power. In September 1992, Mexico and Panama re-established full diplomatic relations.

On 31 December 1999, Mexican President Ernesto Zedillo joined Panamanian President Mireya Moscoso and other world leaders in the transfer of the Canal Zone to Panamanian control.

In March 2024, both nations celebrated 120 years of diplomatic relations. In November 2024, Mexican President Claudia Sheinbaum made a brief layover in Panama while on a commercial flight on her way to Brazil. In Panama, President Sheinbaum met with Foreign Minister Javier Martínez-Acha Vásquez. In July 2026, Panamanian President José Raúl Mulino paid a visit to Mexico and met with President Sheinbaum.

== High-level visits ==
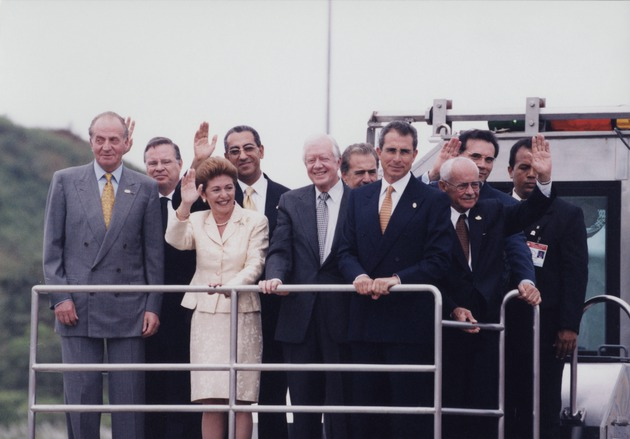
Panamanian President Mireya Moscoso and Mexican President Ernesto Zedillo in the Ceremonial Transfer of Canal Zone in Panama; December 1999.

Panamanian President Ricardo Martinelli and Mexican President Enrique Peña Nieto attending the Ibero-American Summit in Panama City; 2013.

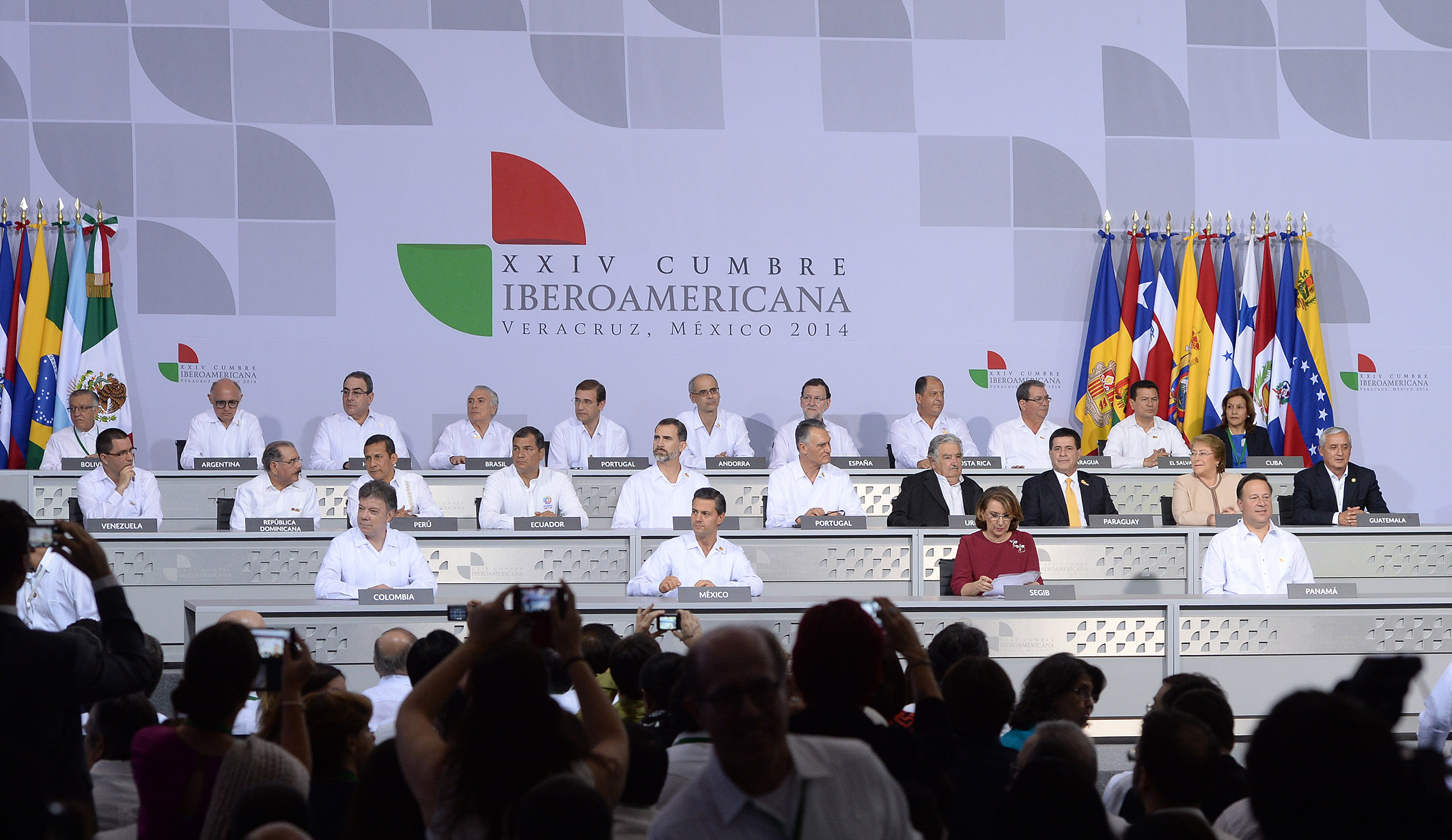
Mexican President Enrique Peña Nieto and Panamanian President Juan Carlos Varela attending the Ibero-American Summit in Veracruz, Mexico; 2014.

Presidential visits from Mexico to Panama

- President Adolfo Ruiz Cortines (1956)
- President Gustavo Díaz Ordaz (1966)
- President José López Portillo (1978)
- President Miguel de la Madrid (1984)
- President Carlos Salinas de Gortari (1994)
- President Ernesto Zedillo (1996, 1998, 1999)
- President Vicente Fox (2001, 2004, 2005, 2006)
- President Felipe Calderón (2008, January & June 2009)
- President Enrique Peña Nieto (2013, 2015)
- President Claudia Sheinbaum (2024)

Presidential visits from Panama to Mexico

- President Omar Torrijos (1969, 1975)
- President Demetrio B. Lakas (1971)
- President Arístides Royo (1981)
- President Ricardo de la Espriella (1982)
- President Nicolás Ardito Barletta Vallarino (1985)
- President Eric Arturo Delvalle (1987)
- President Guillermo Endara (1991, 1992)
- President Ernesto Pérez Balladares (1994, 1997)
- President Mireya Moscoso (2000, 2001, 2002, 2004)
- President Martín Torrijos (2006, 2007)
- President Ricardo Martinelli (2014)
- President Juan Carlos Varela (2014, 2015, 2016)
- President Laurentino Cortizo (2019)
- President José Raúl Mulino (2026)

== Bilateral agreements ==
Both nations have signed several bilateral agreements such as an Agreement on Consular Assistance (1928); Treaty on the Execution of Criminal Judgments (1979); Agreement on Cooperation to Combat Drug Trafficking and Drug Dependency (1995); Agreement on Air Transportation (1996); Agreement on Technical and Scientific Cooperation (1996); Agreement on Educational and Cultural Cooperation (1997); Treaty on Mutual Legal Assistance in Criminal Matters (1997); Agreement on Touristic Cooperation (2000); Agreement for Mutual Cooperation in the Exchange of Information regarding Financial Transactions carried out through Financial Institutions to Prevent, Detect and Combat Operations of Illegal Origin or Money Laundering (2002); Extradition Treaty (2004) and an Agreement to Avoid Double Taxation and Prevent Tax Evasion in Tax on Income (2010).

== Transportation ==
There are direct flights between both nations with Aeroméxico and Copa Airlines.

== Trade relations ==
In April 2014, both nations signed a free trade agreement. In 2023, two-way trade between both nations amounted to US$1.9 billion. Mexico's main exports to Panama include: household electronics, steel, copper alloys and construction parts, motor vehicles, alcohol and petroleum oil. Panama's main exports to Mexico include: palm oil, chemical based products, machinery parts, fish and meat, and essential oils for the perfume industry. Mexican multinational companies such as América Móvil, Cemex, Grupo Bimbo and Gruma (among others) operate in Panama.

== Resident diplomatic missions ==
- Mexico has an embassy in Panama City.
- Panama has an embassy in Mexico City and a consulate-general in Veracruz.

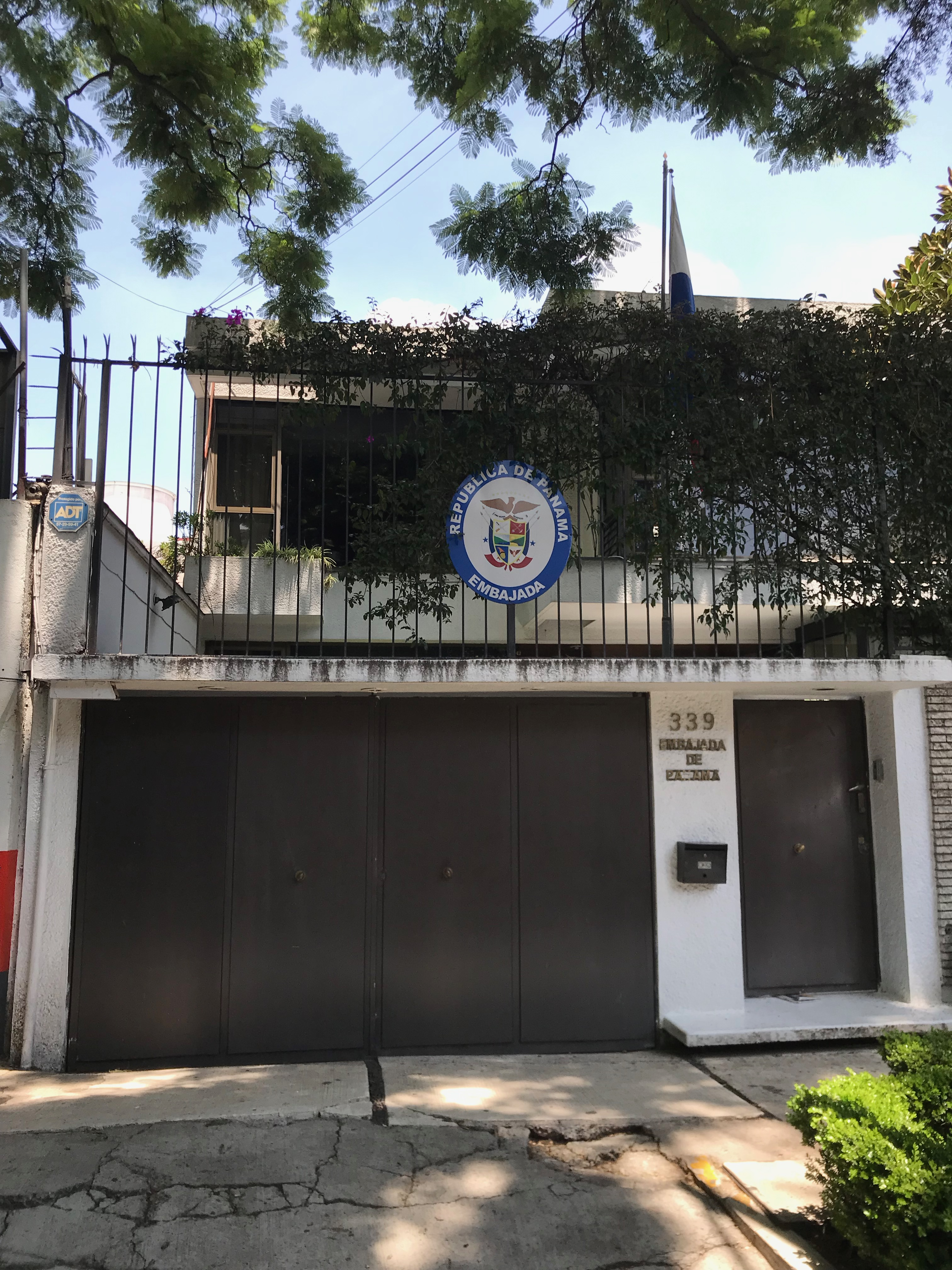
Embassy of Panama in Mexico City

== Gallery ==
Mexican registered ship transversing the Panama Canal

Copa Airlines plane in Mexico City

== See also ==
- Mexicans in Panama
- Panamanians
